= 1984 British League season =

British speedway season

- League: British League
- Champions: Ipswich Witches
- Knockout Cup: Ipswich Witches
- League Cup: Cradley Heathens
- Individual: Chris Morton
- Pairs: Belle Vue Aces
- Midland Cup: Cradley Heathens
- Highest average: Hans Nielsen
- Division/s below: 1984 National League

The 1984 British League season was the 50th season of the top tier of motorcycle speedway in the United Kingdom and the 20th known as the British League.

== Team changes ==
Three teams dropped out and four teams replaced them. Midland's clubs Birmingham Brummies and Leicester Lions both dropped out and Hackney Hawks dropped to the National League, becoming the Hackney Kestrels after taking over from the Crayford Kestrels. The new teams to the league were Oxford Cheetahs, Newcastle Diamonds, Exeter Falcons (all from the National League) and the returning Wolverhampton Wolves who did not ride in 1982 and 1983. Exeter took over the Leicester licence.

== Summary ==
Oxford Cheetahs returned to the league, financed by David Hawkins of Northern Sports, and spent heavily over the off-season. They bought Hans Nielsen from Birmingham for a record £30,000, Simon Wigg for £25,000 from Cradley Heath, Marvyn Cox for £15,000 from Rye House, Melvyn Taylor for £12,000 from King's Lynn and Jens Rasmussen. Defending champions Cradley Heath couldn't hold onto their title after losing Simon Wigg to Oxford and loaning Jan O. Pedersen to Sheffield Tigers because of their huge combined c.m.a. being over the limit.

The 50th season of British speedway saw a close fight between Ipswich Witches, Belle Vue Aces and Cradley Heathens. A resounding home win over Ipswich and a string of away wins meant Belle Vue looked favourites to win the league, but in October Ipswich took 3 points from Cradley home and away to end the midlanders hopes and clinched the title with a win at previously unbeaten at home Reading. They made it a cup double by beating Belle Vue home and away in the final with Belle Vue also missing out in the League Cup final to Cradley Heath. The Suffolk team had a great season despite losing their leading rider Dennis Sigalos who rode for Wolverhampton Wolves until breaking his leg early in the league season. Australian Billy Sanders remained one of the team's main scorers and he was supported by strong season scoring from American showman John Cook, Finn Kai Niemi and the English international pair of Jeremy Doncaster and Richard Knight.

The league season saw some notable absentees. Kenny Carter made no league appearances after breaking his leg and aggravating the injury in attempting to qualify for the World Final. Remarkably he won the British Final despite being barely able to walk. Michael Lee was judged to have endangered the safety of other riders when storming off the track in the wrong direction and received a season long ban (reduced from 3 years after appeal) and made no league appearances for Poole

Draconian measures were brought in to exclude any rider pushing the tapes, as opposed to breaking them. The aforementioned Lee walked out of an England / USA test match after falling foul of the rule strictly applied by the referee. Erik Gundersen scored heavily in the league but his high average was hampered by a string of exclusions for tape infringements so much that he finished outside the top 10 rider averages. In the World Championship, the FIM didn't apply the same strictness and he went on to win his first individual World Title.

A scandal broke in September when the Sunday People newspaper published a story about race fixing and riders being paid to forfeit their place in the British Final. Riders named were Simon Wigg, Malcolm Simmons, John Louis, Mark Courtney, Kelly Moran and Alan Grahame. Specifically Simmons dropping out for Wigg in the British Final and rides by Wigg's opponents in that final came under scrutiny. Wigg was disqualified from the 1985 World Championship.

== Final table ==
Pos	Team	PL	W	D	L	Pts
1	Ipswich Witches	30	25	2	3	52
2	Belle Vue Aces	29	23	3	3	49
3	Cradley Heath Heathens	30	21	2	7	44
4	Reading Racers	30	17	1	12	35
5	Sheffield Tigers	30	15	0	15	30
6	King's Lynn Stars	30	15	0	15	30
7	Wimbledon Dons	30	15	0	15	30
8	Oxford Cheetahs	30	14	1	15	29
9	Swindon Robins	29	12	2	15	26
10	Wolverhampton Wolves	30	13	0	17	26
11	Eastbourne Eagles	30	12	1	17	25
12	Coventry Bees	30	11	2	17	24
13	Poole Pirates	30	10	1	19	21
14	Halifax Dukes	30	9	3	18	21
15	Exeter Falcons	30	8	2	20	18
16	Newcastle Diamonds	30	9	0	21	18

M = Matches; W = Wins; D = Draws; L = Losses; Pts = Total Points

== Fixtures and results ==
Home \ Away	BV	COV	CH	EAS	EX	HAL	IPS	KL	NEW	OX	PP	RR	SHE	SWI	WIM	WOL
Belle Vue		44–34	44–34	64–14	50–28	54–24	55–23	48–30	47–31	49–29	57–21	53–25	49–29	n-h	61–17	49–29
Coventry	39–39		37–41	48–30	59–19	53–25	40–38	50–28	51–27	36–42	42–36	42–36	47–31	38–40	43–35	37–41
Cradley Heath	48–30	46–32		44–34	52–26	44–34	39–39	51–27	56–22	46–32	44–34	48–30	49–29	51–27	36–42	47–31
Eastbourne	36–42	43–35	42–35		49–28	52–26	38–40	36–42	54–24	45–33	40–38	35.5–42.5	48–30	40–38	47–30	47–31
Exeter	38–40	42–35	36–42	41–37		51–27	39–39	33–45	47–31	43–35	46–32	39–39	38–40	44–34	48–30	37–41
Halifax	36–42	39–39	39–39	41–37	44–34		31–47	45–33	41–37	46–32	44–34	42–36	35–43	42–36	45–33	35–43
Ipswich	42–36	52–26	46–32	51–27	51–27	58–20		46–32	60–17	46–32	51–27	41–37	48–29	40–38	48–30	52–26
King's Lynn	31–47	43–35	29–49	44–34	50–28	57–21	34–44		47–31	37–41	48–30	45–33	44–34	45–33	41–37	40–38
Newcastle	37–41	42–35	29–49	37–40	48–30	45–33	28–50	35–43		44–34	50–28	44–34	38–40	46–32	46–31	40–38
Oxford	39–39	43–35	45–33	40.5–37.5	56–22	57–21	35–43	37–41	41–37		43–35	46–32	34–44	41–37	46–32	40.5–37.5
Poole	38–40	41–37	35–43	41–37	41–37	39–39	37–41	44–34	43–35	46–32		31–40	40–38	41–37	41–37	45–33
Reading	40–37	47–30	40–38	43–35	54–24	49–29	32–46	50–28	49–29	41–37	45–33		42–36	46–32	47–31	41–37
Sheffield	37–41	51–27	32–46	47–31	55–23	48–30	43–35	48–30	55–23	40–38	50–28	38–40		41–37	43–35	35–43
Swindon	39–39	47–31	32–46	39–39	53–25	49–29	32–46	48–30	51.5–26.5	40–38	44–34	41–37	40–38		46–32	45–33
Wimbledon	33–44	45–33	43–35	42–36	43–35	47–31	37–41	44–34	42–36	40–38	52–26	44–34	46–32	40–38		47–31
Wolverhampton	37–41	35–43	33–45	41–36	41–37	43–35	38–39	46–31	57–21	37–41	42–36	39–37	43–35	41–37	36–42	

Legend: Blue = home team win; Yellow = draw; Red = away team win.

== Top ten riders (league averages) ==
	Rider	Nat	Team	C.M.A.
1	Hans Nielsen	(Denmark)	Oxford	10.78
2	Chris Morton	(England)	Belle Vue	10.72
3	Jan Andersson	(Sweden)	Reading	10.36
4	Simon Wigg	(England)	Oxford	9.98
5	Phil Crump	(Australia)	Swindon	9.96
6	Bobby Schwartz	(United States)	Eastbourne	9.82
7	Billy Sanders	(Australia)	Ipswich	9.73
8	Peter Collins	(England)	Belle Vue	9.68
9	Shawn Moran	(United States)	Sheffield	9.66
10	John Cook	(United States)	Ipswich	9.36

== British League Knockout Cup ==
The 1984 Speedway Star British League Knockout Cup was the 46th edition of the Knockout Cup for tier one teams. Ipswich Witches were the winners.

First round

Date	Team one	Score	Team two
15/07	Eastbourne	41-36	Poole
30/06	Swindon	36-42	Ipswich
29/06	Exeter	32-46	Wolverhampton
28/06	Wimbledon	46-32	Coventry
25/06	Reading	41-36	Cradley Heath
18/06	Wolverhampton	45-33	Exeter
16/06	Coventry	52-26	Wimbledon
09/06	Cradley Heath	46-32	Reading
09/06	Kings Lynn	49-29	Newcastle
07/06	Ipswich	45-33	Swindon
06/06	Poole	37-41	Eastbourne
12/05	Halifax	37-41	Sheffield
05/05	Belle Vue	53-25	Oxford
26/04	Sheffield	49-29	Halifax

Quarter-finals

Date	Team one	Score	Team two
16/09	Eastbourne	42-34	Kings Lynn
06/09	Sheffield	40-38	Wolverhampton
01/09	Belle Vue	50-28	Coventry
27/08	Coventry	42-36	Belle Vue
25/08	Kings Lynn	57-21	Eastbourne
10/08	Wolverhampton	42-36	Sheffield
26/07	Ipswich	46-32	Cradley Heath
25/07	Cradley Heath	40-38	Ipswich

Semi-finals

Date	Team one	Score	Team two
14/10	Belle Vue	56-22	Wolverhampton
05/10	Wolverhampton	40-38	Belle Vue
27/09	Ipswich	57-21	Kings Lynn
26/09	Kings Lynn	44-34	Ipswich

Final

First leg

27 October 1984

Belle Vue Aces McKinna 9 Collins 8 Morton 6 Smith 6 Ross 2 Carr 2 Courtney 0	33 - 45	Ipswich Witches Sanders 12 Cook 10 Knight 8 Doncaster 7 Niemi 6 Flatman 2 Blackbird 0

Hyde Road Stadium

Second leg

28 October 1984

Ipswich Witches Sanders 9 Doncaster 8 Cook 8 Blackbird 8 Niemi 6 Knight 5 Flatman 3	47 - 31	Belle Vue Aces Smith 9 Ross 9 Morton 6 McKinna 4 Carr 2 Collins 1 Courtney 0

Foxhall Stadium

Ipswich Witches were declared Knockout Cup Champions, winning on aggregate 92-64.

== League Cup ==
The League Cup was split into North and South sections. The two-legged final was won by Cradley Heath Heathens beating Belle Vue Aces in the final 80–76 on aggregate.

North Group

Pos	Team	PL	W	D	L	Pts
1	Belle Vue Aces	12	10	0	2	20
2	Cradley Heathens	12	6	0	6	12
3	Newcastle Diamonds	12	6	0	6	12
4	Coventry Bees	12	5	0	7	10
5	Sheffield Tigers	12	5	0	7	10
6	Wolverhampton Wolves	12	5	0	7	10
7	Halifax Dukes	12	5	0	7	10

South Group

Pos	Team	PL	W	D	L	Pts
1	Reading Racers	16	11	0	5	22
2	Wimbledon Dons	16	11	0	5	22
3	Ipswich Witches	16	10	1	5	21
4	Eastbourne Eagles	16	9	1	6	19
5	Oxford Cheetahs	16	9	0	7	18
6	Poole Pirates	16	8	0	8	16
7	King's Lynn Stars	16	7	0	9	14
8	Swindon Robins	16	5	1	10	11
9	Exeter Falcons	16	0	1	15	1

North Group

Home \ Away	BV	COV	CH	HAL	NEW	SHE	WOL
Belle Vue		54–24	51–27	54–24	60–18	53–25	48–30
Coventry	32–46		40–38	43–35	37–41	52–26	42–35
Cradley	40–38	41–37		50–28	42–36	43–35	42–35
Halifax	27–51	43–35	41–37		48–30	44–34	46–31
Newcastle	33–44	41–37	45–33	45–32		41–37	38–39
Sheffield	36–42	41–37	43–35	49–29	42–36		43–35
Wolverhampton	44–34	37–41	39–38	42–36	30–47	40–38	

Legend: Blue = home team win; Yellow = draw; Red = away team win.

South Group

Home \ Away	EAS	EX	IPS	KL	OX	PP	REA	SWI	WIM
Eastbourne		52–26	42–36	42–36	42–36	51.5–26.5	37–41	40–38	45–33
Exeter	39–39		38–40	35–43	37–41	35–42	30–47	28–50	34–44
Ipswich	49–29	51–27		40–38	36–42	54–24	40–38	47–31	48–30
King's Lynn	44–34	53–25	42–36		32–46	42–36	43–34	41–37	25–53
Oxford	35–43	59–19	29–49	43–35		42–35	37–41	43–35	38–40
Poole	37–41	52–26	39–38	41–37	40–38		32–46	40–38	40–38
Reading	47–31	45–33	37–41	44–34	37–41	44–34		47–31	41–37
Swindon	44–34	55–23	39–39	40–38	41–37	37–41	29–49		36–42
Wimbledon	46–32	52–26	43–35	42–36	37–41	45–33	40–38	42–36	

Legend: Blue = home team win; Yellow = draw; Red = away team win.

Semi-finals

Date	Team one	Score	Team two
21/07	Belle Vue	55–23	Wimbledon
04/08	Cradley Heath	52–26	Reading
09/08	Wimbledon	38–40	Belle Vue
13/08	Reading	42–36	Cradley Heath

Final

First leg

7 October 1984

Cradley Heathens Collins Ph 12 Gundersen 11 King 10 Grahame 4 Cross 3 Jensen 3 Saunders (guest) 1	44 - 34	Belle Vue Aces Morton 11 Smith 5 Collins Pe 5 Carr 5 Ross 4 McKinna 3 Courtney 1

Dudley Wood Stadium

Second leg

14 October 1984

Belle Vue Aces Smith 9 Courtney 8 Collins Pe 7 Morton 7 Carr 6 Ross 3 McKinna 2	42 - 36	Cradley Heathens Gundersen 11 King 11 Collins Ph 7 Grahame 5 Cross 1 Collins S 1 Jensen 0

Hyde Road

Cradley won on aggregate 80-76.

== Riders' Championship ==
Chris Morton won the British League Riders' Championship, held at Hyde Road on 20 October.

Pos.	Rider	Heat Scores	Total
1	(England) Chris Morton	3 1 3 3 3	13+3
2	(Denmark) Hans Nielsen	3 2 2 3 3	13+2
3	(Denmark) Erik Gundersen	3 3 2 3 2	13+1
4	(Denmark) Peter Ravn	2 3 3 2 2	12
5	(United States) Shawn Moran	2 2 2 2 3	11
6	(Denmark) Tommy Knudsen	0 3 3 3 1	10
7	(Australia) Billy Sanders	3 3 1 X 1	8
8	(England) Malcolm Simmons	2 2 1 1 1	7
9	(United States) Sam Ermolenko	0 1 3 0 2	6
10	(Sweden) Jan Andersson	2 2 0 0 2	6
11	(United States) Bobby Schwartz	0 0 0 2 3	5
12	(Australia) Phil Crump	1 1 1 2 X	5
13	(England) Neil Evitts	0 1 2 1 0	4
14	(England) Martin Scarisbrick	1 0 1 1 1	4
15	(England) John Louis	1 0 0 - -	1
16	(England) Andy Campbell	1 0 0 1 0	2
17	(England) Lee Edwards (res)	0 0 - - -	0
18	(England) Glenn Hornby (res)	0 0 - - -	0

- ef=engine failure, f=fell, x=excluded r-retired

== Pairs ==
The British League Pairs Championship was held at Monmore Green Stadium on 11 September and was won by Belle Vue.

Group A
Pos	Team	Pts	Scorers
1	Belle Vue	17	Morton & Collins
2	King's Lynn	14	Louis & Jessup
3	Exeter	14	Campbell & Robinson
4	Ipswich	8	Sanders & Cook

Group B
Pos	Team	Pts	Scorers
1	Reading	18	Shirra & Hunt
2	Halifax	14	Evitts & Baker
3	Cradley	13	Gundersen & Collins
4	Poole	9	Ermolenko & Middleditch

Group C
Pos	Team	Pts	Scorers
1	Coventry	17	Knudsen & Guglielmi
2	Eastbourne	15	Schwartz & Woods
3	Oxford	14	Wigg & Cox
4	Newcastle	8	Owen J & Ingels

Group D
Pos	Team	Pts	Scorers
1	Wimbledon	16	Simmons & Davis
2	Sheffield	16	Moran S & Collins N
3	Wolves	14	Ravn & Grahame
4	Swindon	8	Crump & Petersen

Semi finals

- Belle Vue beat Coventry 7–2
- Reading beat Wimbledon 7–2

Final

- Belle Vue beat Reading 5–4

== Midland Cup ==
Cradley Heath won the Midland Cup for the second consecutive year. The competition consisted of five teams and was sponsored by Marlboro.

First round

Team one	Team two	Score
Wolverhampton	Oxford	43–35, 45–33

Semi final round

Team one	Team two	Score
Coventry	Swindon	45–33, 33–45
Coventry	Swindon	46–32, 32–46
Coventry	Swindon	40–38, 34–43
Cradley	Wolverhampton	40–38, 39–39

=== Final ===
First leg

25 October 1984

Swindon Phil Crump 12 Bo Petersen 10 Ari Koponen 6 Alf Busk 4 Shawn McConnell 3 Per Sorensen 2 Kevin Smith 0	37–40	Cradley Heath Lance King 8 Erik Gundersen 7 Phil Collins 7 Finn Jensen 7 Alan Grahame 6 Simon Cross 5 Steve Collins 0

Abbey Stadium

Second leg

27 October 1984

Cradley Heath Erik Gundersen 10 Phil Collins 9 Lance King 8 Alan Grahame 6 Finn Jensen 6 Simon Cross 4 Steve Collins 0	43–35	Swindon Phil Crump 12 Bo Petersen 8 Per Sorensen 7 Ari Koponen 5 Alf Busk 1 Shawn McConnell 1 Kevin Smith 1

Dudley Wood Stadium

Cradley Heath won on aggregate 83–72

== Riders & final averages ==
Belle Vue

- (England) Chris Morton 10.31
- (England) Peter Collins 9.10
- (New Zealand) Larry Ross 7.75
- (England) Andy Smith 7.25
- (England) Mark Courtney 7.14
- (England) Peter Carr 6.66
- (Scotland) Kenny McKinna 6.39
- (England) Barry Ayres 2.00

Coventry

- (Denmark) Tommy Knudsen 7.87
- (Australia) Gary Guglielmi 7.79
- (England) Steve Bastable 6.89
- (United States) Rick Miller 6.64
- (Denmark) John Jørgensen 6.18
- (Denmark) Sam Nikolajsen 5.31
- (England) Kevin Hawkins 5.19
- (England) Steve Payne 2.62

Cradley Heath

- (Denmark) Erik Gundersen 9.54
- (United States) Lance King 8.65
- (England) Phil Collins 8.40
- (England) Alan Grahame 7.87
- (England) Simon Cross 7.27
- (Denmark) Finn Jensen 5.08
- (England) Mike Wilding 1.96
- (England) Steve Collins 1.49

Eastbourne

- (United States) Bobby Schwartz 9.42
- (Denmark) John Eskildsen 8.07
- (England) Paul Woods 8.05
- (Czech Republic) Antonín Kasper Jr. 6.76
- (England) Colin Richardson 6.01
- (Finland) Olli Tyrväinen 4.91
- (Zimbabwe) Denzil Kent 4.37
- (United States) Steve Lucero 4.18
- (England) Martin Goodwin 4.00
- (England) Paul Bosley 3.81

Exeter

- (New Zealand) Ivan Mauger 8.08
- (England) Andy Campbell 6.90
- (England) Sean Willmott 6.01
- (Sweden) Leif Wahlman 5.29
- (United States) Buddy Robinson 5.27
- (Australia) Rob Maxfield 5.05
- (Denmark) Frank Andersen 4.98
- (England) Louis Carr 4.15
- (Wales) Kevin Price 2.59
- (England) Steve Bishop 2.08
- (England) Keith Millard 2.00
- (England) Michael Coles 1.00

Halifax

- (England) Kenny Carter 9.21
- (England) Neil Evitts 7.44
- (Australia) Steve Baker 6.08
- (England) Eric Monaghan 5.16
- (England) Doug Wyer 4.95
- (England) Steve Finch 4.64
- (England) Craig Pendlebury 4.58
- (Denmark) Kurt Hansen 3.52

Ipswich

- (Australia) Billy Sanders 9.69
- (United States) John Cook 8.83
- (England) Jeremy Doncaster 8.16
- (Finland) Kai Niemi 7.98
- (England) Richard Knight7.43
- (England) Nigel Flatman 5.29
- (England) Carl Blackbird 4.97
- (England) Carl Baldwin 3.53

King's Lynn

- (England) John Louis 8.29
- (England) Dave Jessup 7.42
- (Sweden) Richard Hellsen 6.72
- (Australia) Steve Regeling 6.61
- (England) Kevin Jolly 6.38
- (England) Martin Dixon 6.05
- (England) Keith Bloxsome 4.00

Newcastle

- (England) Joe Owen 8.04
- (Australia) Rod Hunter 7.01
- (New Zealand) David Bargh 6.68
- (United States) Eddie Ingels 5.84
- (England) Steve McDermott 5.18
- (England) Phil White 4.82
- (England) Martin Scarisbrick 4.62
- (England) Reg Wilson 4.13
- (New Zealand) Alan Mason 3.92

Oxford

- (Denmark) Hans Nielsen 10.76
- (England) Simon Wigg 9.69
- (England) Marvyn Cox 6.29
- (England) Melvyn Taylor 6.06
- (Denmark) Jens Rasmussen 5.57
- (England) Ian Clark 4.59
- (England) Nigel Sparshott 4.48
- (Germany) Klaus Lausch 4.15
- (England) Martin Yeates 2.00
- (England) Dave Perks 1.93

Poole

- (England) Michael Lee 9.24
- (United States) Sam Ermolenko 6.71
- (Denmark) Finn Thomsen 6.32
- (Australia) Stan Bear 6.15
- (Denmark) Brian Jakobsen 5.85
- (England) Neil Middleditch 5.77
- (England) Kevin Smith 5.62
- (West Germany) Gerd Riss 4.57
- (Sweden) Leif Wahlman 3.54

Reading

- (Sweden) Jan Andersson 10.05
- (New Zealand) Mitch Shirra 9.26
- (Sweden) Per Jonsson 6.52
- (England) Tim Hunt 5.75
- (England) Malcolm Holloway 5.43
- (Sweden) Pierre Brannefors 5.41
- (Denmark) Peter Glanz 4.87

Sheffield

- (United States) Shawn Moran 9.85
- (England) Neil Collins 8.03
- (England) Les Collins 7.83
- (England) Dave Morton 6.00
- (Denmark) Jan O. Pedersen 6.00
- (England) Martin Hagon 5.18
- (England) Reg Wilson 4.77
- (England) Nigel Crabtree 3.59
- (New Zealand) Alan Mason 2.94

Swindon

- (Australia) Phil Crump 9.94
- (Denmark) Bo Petersen 8.33
- (Finland) Ari Koponen 6.15
- (Sweden) Bjorn Andersson 5.73
- (United States) Shawn McConnell 5.33
- (England) Alun Rossiter 5.01
- (Denmark) Alf Busk 4.95
- (Denmark) Per Sorensen 4.65
- (England) Martin Yeates 3.78

Wimbledon

- (England) John Davis 8.38
- (England) Malcolm Simmons 8.38
- (England) Kelvin Tatum 7.18
- (England) Gordon Kennett 6.04
- (Australia) John Titman 5.82
- (England) Roger Johns 5.69
- (Zimbabwe) Mike Ferreira 5.45
- (England) Andy Galvin 2.95

Wolverhampton

- (United States) Dennis Sigalos 9.87
- (Denmark) Preben Eriksen 8.45
- (Denmark) Peter Ravn 7.47
- (England) Andy Grahame 7.23
- (United States) Steve Lucero 4.61
- (England) Louis Carr 4.52
- (United States) Rob Pfetzing 4.51
- (Denmark) Kent Noer 3.69
- (Australia) David Cheshire 3.23
- (England) Steve Schofield 3.00
- (England) Paul Thorp 2.90

== See also ==
- List of United Kingdom Speedway League Champions
- Knockout Cup (speedway)
