= 1985 British League season =

British motorcycle speedway season

- League: British League
- No. of competitors: 11
- Champions: Oxford Cheetahs
- Knockout Cup: Oxford Cheetahs
- League Cup: Coventry Bees
- Individual: Erik Gundersen
- Pairs: Oxford Cheetahs
- Midland Cup: Oxford Cheetahs
- Highest average: Hans Nielsen
- Division/s below: 1985 National League

The 1985 British League season was the 51st season of the top tier of motorcycle speedway in the United Kingdom and the 21st known as the British League.

== Team changes ==
The league was cut drastically from 16 teams to 11. This meant the League Cup was expanded to be a competition with more fixtures than the British League. Both competitions would now see all teams meet home and away with only the League Cup having semi-finals and a final. Bonus points were introduced in both competitions awarded to the team that won each fixture on aggregate, with a run-off as a tie-breaker if the scores are level.

Wimbledon Dons dropped to the National league, this was the first time that Wimbledon would not compete in the top tier of speedway. They were joined in the National League by Poole Pirates, who took over Weymouth Wildcats to become Poole Wildcats, Eastbourne Eagles and Exeter Falcons. Newcastle Diamonds had no speedway in 1985 but they would return to the National League in 1986. There were no new entrants to the British League.

== Summary ==
Oxford Cheetahs won the league and cup double. The Oxford team, financed by the Oxford Stadium owners Northern Sports and headed by David Hawkins was the most expensive team assembled in the history of the league. The team included Danish international Hans Nielsen (signed for a record £30,000) in 1984. Nielsen had topped the previous season's averages on Oxford's return to the league and was imperious during 1985, finishing with an exceptional average, way ahead of any other rider. The team eased to the league title by a clear ten points, with Simon Wigg, Andy Grahame, Marvyn Cox, Jens Rasmussen and Melvyn Taylor all riding over 50 matches each during the season.

Defending champions Ipswich Witches finished mid-table which was not surprising taking into account that just three matches into the season their leading rider Billy Sanders committed suicide on 23 April. The news shocked the club and the wider speedway world at the time.

== Final table ==
Pos	Team	PL	W	D	L	BP	Pts
1	Oxford Cheetahs	20	16	1	3	10	43
2	Sheffield Tigers	20	13	1	6	6	33
3	Coventry Bees	20	11	2	7	7	31
4	Halifax Dukes	20	9	1	10	5	24
5	Ipswich Witches	20	9	2	9	4	24
6	Belle Vue Aces	20	10	0	10	4	24
7	Cradley Heath Heathens	19	10	0	9	4	24
8	Swindon Robins	20	8	1	11	6	23
9	Reading Racers	19	6	4	9	6	22
10	Wolverhampton Wolves	20	5	2	13	2	14
11	King's Lynn Stars	20	5	0	15	0	10

M = Matches; W = Wins; D = Draws; L = Losses; Pts = Total Points

== Fixtures and results ==
Home \ Away	BV	COV	CH	HAL	IPS	KL	OX	RR	SHE	SWI	WOL
Belle Vue		45–33	43–35	47–31	41–37	51–27	37–40	42–35	40–37	50–28	47–31
Coventry	43–34		41–36	43–35	45–33	47–31	37–41	45–33	49–29	39–38	53–25
Cradley Heath	41–37	34–44		48–30	42–36	48–30	41–37	41–37	38–40	40–38	49–29
Halifax	49–29	47–31	47–30		44–34	47–30	40–38	49–29	33–45	44–34	52–26
Ipswich	42–36	43–35	42–36	43–35		40–38	36–42	39–39	47–30	43–35	49–29
King's Lynn	37–41	40–38	32–46	42–36	34–44		32–46	41–37	52–26	36–42	41–37
Oxford	44–34	43–35	47–31	47–30	39–39	47–31		50–28	43–35	45–33	41–37
Reading	43–35	39–39	n–h	51–27	42–36	54–22	35–42		39–39	46–32	34–44
Sheffield	42–36	40–38	49–29	41–37	41–37	63–15	41–37	38–40		48–30	46–31
Swindon	61–16	35–43	45–33	47–31	49–29	46–32	38–40	39–39	37–41		49–29
Wolverhampton	41–37	39–39	36–42	39–39	46–32	44–34	38–40	43–34	33–45	38–40	

Legend: Blue = home team win; Yellow = draw; Red = away team win.

== Top ten riders (league averages) ==
	Rider	Nat	Team	C.M.A.
1	Hans Nielsen	(Denmark)	Oxford Cheetahs	11.43
2	Erik Gundersen	(Denmark)	Cradley Heathens	11.12
3	Tommy Knudsen	(Denmark)	Coventry Bees	10.37
4	Shawn Moran	(United States)	Sheffield Tigers	10.26
5	Bobby Schwartz	(United States)	Wolverhampton Wolves	10.00
6	Simon Wigg	(England)	Oxford Cheetahs	9.71
7	Jeremy Doncaster	(England)	Ipswich Witches	9.61
8	Chris Morton	(England)	Belle Vue Aces	9.53
9	Jan Andersson	(Sweden)	Reading Racers	9.52
10	John Cook	(United States)	Ipswich Witches	9.41

== British League Knockout Cup ==
The 1985 Speedway Star British League Knockout Cup was the 47th edition of the Knockout Cup for tier one teams. Oxford Cheetahs were the winners.

First round

Date	Team one	Score	Team two
19/07	Oxford	43-35	Coventry
29/06	Swindon	36-42	Ipswich
24/06	Wolverhampton	49-29	Halifax
15/06	Coventry	35-43	Oxford
30/05	Ipswich	45-33	Swindon
25/05	Halifax	48-30	Wolverhampton

Quarter-finals

Date	Team one	Score	Team two
23/09	Reading	43-34	Sheffield
22/08	Sheffield	39-39	Reading
29/08	Ipswich	43-34	Wolverhampton
19/08	Wolverhampton	39-39	Ipswich
31/07	Oxford	47-31	Belle Vue
20/07	Belle Vue	40-38	Oxford
11/07	Sheffield	46-32	Reading
08/07	Reading	46-32	Sheffield
07/07	Cradley Heath	53-25	Kings Lynn
06/07	Kings Lynn	39-39	Cradley Heath

Semi-finals

Date	Team one	Score	Team two
22/10	Reading	38-40	Oxford
16/10	Oxford	41-36	Reading
11/09	Cradley Heath	36-42	Ipswich
19/09	Ipswich	43-35	Cradley Heath

Final

First leg

27 October 1985

Ipswich Witches John Cook Jeremy Doncaster Richard Knight Dennis Sigalos	41–37	Oxford Cheetahs Hans Nielsen 14 Simon Wigg 10 Jens Rasmussen Troy Butler

Foxhall Stadium

Second leg

30 October 1985

Oxford Cheetahs Hans Nielsen 15 Simon Wigg 12 Marvyn Cox 7 Troy Butler 4 Alistair Stevens 4 Jens Rasmussen 0 Andy Grahame R/R	42–35	Ipswich Witches John Cook 12 Richard Knight 9 Dennis Sigalos 4 Alan Farmer 4 Jeremy Doncaster 3 Kai Niemi 2 Robbie Fuller 1

Oxford Stadium

Oxford Cheetahs were declared Knockout Cup Champions, winning on aggregate 79-76.

== League Cup ==
The League Cup was contested as a league format. Coventry Bees won the final over two legs defeating Oxford Cheetahs 86–70 on aggregate.

Qualifying table

Pos	Team	PL	W	D	L	Pts
1	Cradley Heathens	20	13	1	6	34
2	Oxford Cheetahs	20	11	2	7	32
3	Ipswich Witches	20	12	1	7	32
4	Coventry Bees	20	10	3	7	30
5	Wolverhampton Wolves	20	10	1	9	27
6	Swindon Robins	20	11	0	9	26
7	Belle Vue Aces	20	9	2	9	24
8	Reading Racers	20	8	2	10	21
9	Halifax Dukes	20	8	0	12	20
10	Sheffield Tigers	20	4	1	15	19
11	King's Lynn Stars	20	4	1	15	10

== Fixtures and results ==
Home \ Away	BV	COV	CH	HAL	IPS	KL	OX	RR	SHE	SWI	WOL
Belle Vue		41–37	35–43	40–38	39–39	49–29	44–34	43–35	39–39	51–27	42–36
Coventry	41–37		45–32	38–40	42–36	48–30	39–39	39–39	44–34	42–36	41–37
Cradley Heath	45–33	41–37		45–33	45–33	50–28	38–40	46–32	42–36	47–31	41–37
Halifax	41–37	37–41	36–42		44–34	46–32	40–38	43–35	36–42	44–34	41–37
Ipswich	44–34	44–34	40–38	52–26		43–35	43–35	52–26	42–36	36–42	42–36
King's Lynn	35–43	37–41	44–34	43–35	36–42		30–47	42–36	51–27	38–40	36–42
Oxford	52–26	40–38	39–39	51–27	36–42	42–36		41–36	48–30	38–40	45–33
Reading	42–36	39–39	45–33	45–33	43–35	41–37	42–36		41–37	37–41	46–32
Sheffield	33–45	36–42	34–44	51–27	34–44	61–17	42–36	41–37		52–26	44–34
Swindon	43–35	47–31	35–43	42–36	48–30	50–28	37–41	43–35	41–37		33–45
Wolverhampton	50–28	40–38	44–34	40–37	43–35	39–39	36–42	40–38	57–1	47–31	

Legend: Blue = home team win; Yellow = draw; Red = away team win.

Semi-finals

Date	Team one	Score	Team two
15/08	Ipswich	37–41	Oxford
25/09	Cradley Heath	40–38	Coventry
27/09	Oxford	39–39	Ipswich
02/10	Coventry	46–32	Cradley Heath

Final

First leg

25 October 1985

Oxford Cheetahs Simon Wigg 14 Hans Nielsen 13 Marvyn Cox 9 Nigel De'ath 3 Jens Rasmussen 2 Troy Butler 1 Andy Grahame r/r	42–36	Coventry Bees Tommy Knudsen 11 Kelvin Tatum 9 Rick Miller 5 David Bargh 4 Steve Bastable 3 Frank Andersen 3 John Jorgensen 1

Oxford Stadium

Second leg

26 October 1985

Coventry Bees Kelvin Tatum 12 Rick Miller 10 Tommy Knudsen 9 John Jorgensen 6 Steve Bastable 5 David Bargh 4 Frank Andersen 4	50–28	Oxford Cheetahs Hans Nielsen 14 Simon Wigg 6 Jens Rasmussen 4 Troy Butler 2 Marvyn Cox 1 Melvyn Taylor 1 Andy Grahame r/r

Brandon Stadium

== Riders' Championship ==
Erik Gundersen won the British League Riders' Championship for the second time, the final was held at Hyde Road on 20 October.

Pos.	Rider	Heat Scores	Total
1	(Denmark) Erik Gundersen	3 3 3 2 3	14
2	(England) Peter Collins	3 3 1 2 3	12+3
3	(England) Chris Morton	2 2 3 3 2	12+2
4	(Denmark) Tommy Knudsen	0 3 3 3 2	11
5	(England) Kelvin Tatum	3 3 2 1 2	11
6	(Denmark) Hans Nielsen	2 1 2 3 3	11
7	(United States) Shawn Moran	1 2 3 2 3	11
8	(England) Neil Evitts	3 2 1 1 1	8
9	(United States) John Cook	1 1 2 1 1	6
10	(Denmark) Bo Petersen	0 0 1 3 1	5
11	(Sweden) Jan Andersson	1 2 0 2 0	5
12	(England) Simon Wigg	2 1 1 1 0	5
13	(England) Dave Jessup	0 1 2 0 0	3
14	(England) Phil Collins	2 0 0 0 0	2
15	(England) Jeremy Doncaster	0 0 0 0 2	2
16	(Denmark) Peter Ravn	1 0 0 0 1	2

- ef=engine failure, f=fell, x=excluded r-retired

== Pairs ==
The British League Pairs Championship was held at Monmore Green Stadium on 30 June and was won by Oxford.

Pos	Team	Pts	Riders
1	Oxford	35	Nielsen 23, Wigg 12
2	Reading	34	Davis 20, Shirra 14
3	Cradley	33	Gundersen 18, Collins P 15
4	Sheffield	26	Moran S 20, Collins N 6
5	Belle Vue	23	Morton 17, Collins P 6
6	Coventry	17	Tatum 11, Knudsen 6
7	Swindon	15	Petersen 15, Simmons 0

== Leading final averages ==
Rider	Team	Average
(Denmark) Hans Nielsen	Oxford	11.35
(United States) Shawn Moran	Sheffield	10.39
(Denmark) Erik Gundersen	Cradley Heath	10.38
(England) Kenny Carter	Halifax	10.13
(Denmark) Tommy Knudsen	Coventry	10.13
(United States) Bobby Schwartz	Wolverhampton	9.80
(England) Chris Morton	Belle Vue	9.77
(Sweden) Jan Andersson	Reading	9.43
(Denmark) Bo Petersen	Swindon	9.35
(United States) John Cook	Ipswich	9.33

== Midland Cup ==
Oxford won the Midland Cup. The competition consisted of six teams.

First round

Team one	Team two	Score
Wolverhampton	Oxford	32–46, 31–47
Coventry	Reading	38–40, 34–44

Semi final round

Team one	Team two	Score
Cradley	Reading	44–34, 37–41
Oxford	Swindon	42–36, 39–39

Final

First leg

23 October 1985

Oxford Simon Wigg 12 Andy Grahame 9 Jens Rasmussen 8 Marvyn Cox 6 Hans Nielsen 4 Troy Butler 4 Nigel De'ath 2	45–33	Cradley Heath Alan Grahame 10 Erik Gundersen 8 Jan O Pedersen 5 Phil Collins 5 Simon Cross 2 Finn Jensen 2 Nigel Leaver 1

Oxford Stadium

Second leg

31 October 1985

Cradley Heath Phil Collins 10 Erik Gundersen 8 Simon Cross 7 Jan O Pedersen 5 Alan Grahame 5 Finn Jensen 3 Nigel Leaver 0	38–40	Oxford Andy Grahame 10 Simon Wigg 9 Hans Nielsen 8 Marvyn Cox 6 Troy Butler 5 Nigel De'ath 1 Alastair Stevens 1

Dudley Wood Stadium

Oxford won on aggregate 85–71

== Riders & final averages ==
Belle Vue

- (England) Chris Morton 9.77
- (England) Peter Collins 8.92
- (England) Andy Smith 7.59
- (England) Carl Blackbird 6.16
- (Scotland) Kenny McKinna 5.83
- (England) Andy Campbell 4.90
- (England) Martin Scarisbrick 4.36
- (United States) Eddie Ingels 3.33
- (England) Bernie Collier 1.33
- (England) Mark Crang 1.10

Coventry

- (Denmark) Tommy Knudsen 10.13
- (England) Kelvin Tatum 9.09
- (Denmark) John Jørgensen 6.68
- (United States) Rick Miller 6.12
- (England) Steve Bastable 5.93
- (New Zealand) David Bargh 5.76
- (Denmark) Frank Andersen 4.11
- (England) Kevin Hawkins 3.41

Cradley Heath

- (Denmark) Erik Gundersen 10.38
- (England) Phil Collins 7.93
- (Denmark) Jan O. Pedersen 7.91
- (England) Alan Grahame 7.37
- (England) Simon Cross 6.21
- (Denmark) Finn Jensen 5.41
- (England) Kevin Smith 4.26
- (England) Steve Collins 1.23
- (England) Nigel Leaver 1.20

Halifax

- (England) Kenny Carter 10.13
- (England) Neil Evitts 7.26
- (New Zealand) Larry Ross 6.62
- (Australia) Rod Hunter 6.17
- (England) Sean Willmott 5.41
- (England) Eric Monaghan 5.40
- (Denmark) Kurt Hansen 5.16
- (England) Doug Wyer 4.19

Ipswich

- (United States) John Cook 9.33
- (England) Jeremy Doncaster 9.12
- (England) Richard Knight 8.12
- (Finland) Kai Niemi 6.14
- (England) Louis Carr 5.47
- (United States) Dennis Sigalos 5.16
- (England) Nigel Flatman 5.10
- (England) Alan Farmer 3.07
- (England) Andy Hines 2.38

King's Lynn

- (England) Dave Jessup 7.80
- (England) Michael Lee 7.20
- (Australia) Steve Regeling 6.19
- (England) Kevin Jolly 6.12
- (England) Mark Courtney 5.91
- (Sweden) Richard Hellsen 5.76
- (Australia) Steve Baker 4.84
- (England) Paul Woods 4.54

Oxford

- (Denmark) Hans Nielsen 11.35
- (England) Simon Wigg 9.10
- (England) Andy Grahame 7.18
- (England) Marvyn Cox 6.07
- (Denmark) Jens Rasmussen 6.07
- (England) Melvyn Taylor 4.87
- (Germany) Klaus Lausch 4.78
- (Australia) Troy Butler 2.22

Reading

- (Sweden) Jan Andersson 9.43
- (England) John Davis 9.01
- (New Zealand) Mitch Shirra 6.79
- (England) Martin Goodwin 6.33
- (Sweden) Per Jonsson 6.33
- (England) Tim Hunt 5.59
- (Denmark) Peter Glanz 5.57
- (England) Malcolm Holloway 4.72
- (England) Neil Middleditch 4.67
- (England) Mark Chessell 2.05

Sheffield

- (United States) Shawn Moran 10.39
- (England) Neil Collins 7.33
- (England) Les Collins 6.91
- (England) Peter Carr 6.81
- (Denmark) Sam Nikolajsen 6.33
- (England) Martin Hagon 5.85
- (Denmark) Alf Busk 5.50
- (Australia) Steve Baker 4.22
- (England) Gerald Short 3.34

Swindon

- (Denmark) Bo Petersen 9.35
- (Australia) Phil Crump 8.92
- (England) Malcolm Simmons 7.90
- (Sweden) Jimmy Nilsen 6.54
- (England) Gordon Kennett 6.31
- (Denmark) Per Sorensen 5.54
- (Denmark) Alf Busk 5.40
- (Finland) Ari Koponen 5.02
- (England) Alun Rossiter 3.69
- (England) Martin Yeates 1.71

Wolverhampton

- (United States) Bobby Schwartz 9.80
- (Denmark) Peter Ravn 7.72
- (Denmark) Preben Eriksen 7.69
- (Denmark) John Eskildsen 7.42
- (England) Steve Schofield 4.97
- (England) Martin Scarisbrick 4.89
- (Denmark) Brian Jakobsen 4.79
- (Germany) Gerd Riss 3.88
- (Denmark) Jan Stæchmann 2.00

== See also ==
- Speedway in the United Kingdom
- List of United Kingdom Speedway League Champions
- Knockout Cup (speedway)
