= 1985 Individual Speedway World Championship =

Motorcycle speedway world championship season

Seasons
- ← 1984 1986 →

The 1985 Individual Speedway World Championship was the 40th edition of the official World Championship to determine the world champion rider.

Odsal Stadium, the new home of international speedway in England after the demise of the Wembley Stadium and White City Stadium tracks, was chosen by the FIM to host the 1985 Final on 31 August 1985; the first time that the final had been held in England at a venue other than Wembley.

A crowd of around 30,000 attended the 1985 Final, which was won by defending champion Erik Gundersen from fellow Dane Hans Nielsen and surprise third placing Sam Ermolenko of the United States. All three riders finished the meeting on 13 points and were forced into a run-off to decide the podium placings. The only English rider in the field, 21-year-old Kelvin Tatum, finished 8th with 8 points in his first World Final. He won his first race, but later admitted that he let the occasion get to him which affected his riding.

== First round ==
=== British qualification ===
- Riders progress to British semi-finals

Date	Venue	Winner	2nd	3rd
Preliminary Round
11 April	Rye House Stadium, Hoddesdon	Mike Ferreira	Jamie Luckhurst	Andrew Silver
17 April	Long Eaton Stadium, Long Eaton	Trevor Banks	Dave Perks	Louis Carr
18 April	Cleveland Park Stadium, Middlesbrough	Steve Wilcock	Geoff Pusey	Mike Spink
19 April	East of England Arena, Peterborough	Carl Blackbird	Tim Hunt	Kevin Hawkins
19 April	Powderhall Stadium, Edinburgh	David Blackburn	Bruce Cribb	Paul Thorp
Quarter-Final
27 April	King's Lynn Stadium, King's Lynn	Carl Blackbird	Melvyn Taylor	Tim Hunt

=== Swedish qualification ===
- Top 6 in each heat to Swedish final

(4 May, Gubbängens IP Stockholm)
Pos	Rider	Points
1	Tommy Nilsson	14
2	Patrik Karlsson	14
3	Erik Stenlund	12
4	Lars Andersson	12
5	Jimmie Magnusson	10
6	Åke Fridell	9
7	Conny Ivarsson	9
8	Uno Johansson	9
9	Mikael Teurnberg	6
10	Kent Rickardsson	5
11	Kenneth Nyström	5
12	Roger Sundberg	3
13	Peder Messing	3
14	Anders Nilsson	3
15	Magnus Jonsson	2
16	Mikael Löfqvist	1

(4 May, Gamla Målilla Motorstadion Målilla)
Pos	Rider	Points
1	Per Jonsson	14
2	Anders Kling	14
3	Mikael Blixt	12
4	Bengt Jansson	10
5	Jan Lundgren	9
6	Hans Wahlström	9
7	Dennis Löfqvist	8
8	Lars Hammarberg	8
9	Kjell Nielsen	7
10	Alf Trofast	6
11	Tony Gudbrand	6
12	Roland Dannö	4
13	Jan Davidsson	4
14	Mikael Reinholdsson	2
15	Roger Gustavsson	1
16	Stefan Andersson	0

(5 May, Grevby Motorstadion Mariestad)
Pos	Rider	Points
1	Jimmy Nilsen	15
2	Per-Ove Gudmundsson	12
3	Richard Hellsén	12
4	Christer Rohlén	11
5	Börje Ring	10
6	Pierre Brannefors	9
7	Tony Olsson	9
8	Tommy Lindgren	8
9	Lillebror Johansson	8
10	Johan Zackrisson	6
11	Kent Björk	6
12	Johan Staaf	6
13	Mats Olsson	3
14	Mikael Messing	3
15	Kari Virta	1
16	Bo Arrhén	1

=== Australian qualification ===
Date	Event	Venue	Winner	2nd	3rd
3 Nov 84	Northern Territory Final	Tennant Creek Speedway	David Jackson	Brent Knott	Glen Baxter
24 November 84	Queensland Final	Pioneer Park, Ayr	Steve Regeling	Stan Bear	Steve Koppe
1 Dec 84	South Australian Final	Riverview Speedway, Murray Bridge	Mark Fiora	Steve Baker	Darryl Branford
7 Dec 84	Western Australian Final	Claremont Speedway, Perth	Mick McKenna		
16 Dec 84	New South Wales Final	Meeanee Speedway, Napier	Billy Sanders	Gary Guglielmi	Rudy Muts
23 Dec 84	Victorian Final	Olympic Park, Mildura	Phil Crump	Rod Hunter	Bill Barret

== Second round ==
=== Continental preliminary round ===
- Riders progress to Continental quarter-finals

Date	Venue	Winner	2nd	3rd
21 April	(West Germany) Rhein-Main Arena, Diedenbergen	(West Germany) Klaus Lausch	(West Germany) Hubert Diener	(Czechoslovakia) Stanislav Urban
21 April	(Bulgaria) Speedway Stadium, Targovishte	(Bulgaria) Angel Jeftimov	(Soviet Union) Igor Stolyarov	(Poland) Grzegorz Dzikowski
21 April	(Poland) KS Apator Stadium, Toruń	(Poland) Leonard Raba	(Poland) Wojciech Żabiałowicz	(Czechoslovakia) Antonín Kasper Jr.
21 April	(Hungary) Borsod Volán Stadion, Miskolc	(Soviet Union) Viktor Kuznetsov	(Poland) Wojciech Załuski	(Hungary) József Petrikovics

=== British semi-finals ===
- 19 May
- (England) The Shay, Halifax
- Top 8 to British final

Pos.	Rider	Points
1	Kenny Carter	14+3
2	John Davis	14+2
3	Neil Collins	12
4	Phil Collins	10
5	Neil Evitts	9
6	Peter Collins	9
7	Tim Hunt	9
8	Andy Campbell	8
9	Mark Courtney	7
10	Sean Willmott	7
11	Peter Carr	5
12	Richard Knight	5
13	Louis Carr	4
14	Kevin Jolly	3
15	Carl Blackbird	2
16	Kenny McKinna	2
17	Ian Sutcliffe (res)	0

- 22 May
- (England) Dudley Wood Stadium, Dudley
- Top 8 to British final

Pos.	Rider	Points
1	Andy Grahame	14
2	Kelvin Tatum	13
3	Simon Cross	12
4	Chris Morton	12
5	Andy Smith	11
6	Les Collins	9
7	Alan Grahame	8
8	Dave Jessup	7
9	Steve Bastable	7
10	Jamie Luckhurst	6
11	Melvyn Taylor	5
12	Mike Spink	5
13	Jeremy Doncaster	5
14	Bruce Cribb	2
15	David Backburn	2
16	Paul Woods	2
17	John Bostin	0
18	Nigel Leaver	0

== Third round ==
=== Continental quarter-finals ===
- Top 32 to Continental semi-finals

Date	Venue	Winner	2nd	3rd
1 May	(Italy) Santa Marina Stadium, Lonigo	(Italy) Armando Castagna	(Poland) Grzegorz Dzikowski	(Italy) Valentino Furlanetto
1 May	(Socialist Federal Republic of Yugoslavia) Matija Gubec Stadium, Krško	(Czechoslovakia) Antonín Kasper Jr.	(Italy) Armando Dal Chiele	(Hungary) Laszlo Bodi
1 May	(West Germany) Hansa Stadium, Bremen	(West Germany) Klaus Lausch	(Czechoslovakia) Václav Verner	(Czechoslovakia) Zdenek Schneiderwind
5 May	(Austria) Stadion Wiener Neustadt	(Hungary) Zoltan Adorjan	(Hungary) Sandor Tihanyi	(Poland) Andrzej Huszcza

=== American Final ===
- 8 June 1985
- (United States) Veterans Memorial Stadium, Long Beach
- First 5 to Overseas final

Placing	Rider	Total	1	2	3	4	5	6	7	8	9	10	11	12	13	14	15	16	17	18	19	20	Pts	Pos	21
1	(United States) (12) John Cook	15			3					3		3			3						3		15	1	
2	(United States) (3) Sam Ermolenko	13	3						3				2				3				2		13	2	
3	(United States) (8) Shawn Moran	12		2						2			3			3			2				12	3	
4	(United States) (14) Lance King	11				3		3					1		2							2	11	4	3
5	(United States) (13) Rick Miller	11				2	3							3		2					1		11	5	2
6	(United States) (5) Bobby Schwartz	11		3			2					1					2					3	11	6	1
7	(United States) (15) Kelly Moran	11				1			2			2						3	3				11	7	F
8	(United States) (10) Alan Christian	7			1			2						2			1		1				7	8	
9	(United States) (9) Brad Oxley	7			2		0						0					2		3			7	9	
10	(United States) (6) Keith Larsen	5		1				1			3							0			F		5	10	
11	(United States) (4) Mike Carusco	5	1							1				1				1				1	5	11	
12	(United States) (1) Mike Faria	3	2				1				F				X				0				3	12	
13	(United States) (7) Keith Christo	3		0					1					0	1					1			3	13	
14	(United States) (11) Jim Lawson	3			X				0		2					1						0	3	14	
15	(United States) (2) Mike Dwyer	2	0					0				0				0				2			2	15	
16	(United States) (16) Gene Woods	1				0				X	1						0			0			1	16	
Placing	Rider	Total	1	2	3	4	5	6	7	8	9	10	11	12	13	14	15	16	17	18	19	20	Pts	Pos	21

m - exclusion for exceeding two minute time allowance • t - exclusion for touching the tapes • x - other exclusion • e - retired or mechanical failure • f - fell • ns - non-starter • nc - non-classify

gate A - inside	gate B	gate C	gate D - outside

=== New Zealand Final ===
- (New Zealand) - No final, David Bargh seeded direct to Overseas final

=== Australian Final ===
- 5 January 1985
- (Australia) Pioneer Park, Ayr
- First 2 to Overseas final

Pos.	Rider	Heat Scores	Total
1	Billy Sanders	(3,3,3,3,3)	15
2	Phil Crump	(X,3,2,2,3)	11
3	Stan Bear	(2,2,2,2,3)	11
4	Mark Fiora	(2,2,3,2,2)	11
5	Steve Regeling	(1,3,0,3,3)	10
6	Alan Rivett	(3,1,3,1,2)	10
7	Gary Guglielmi	(3,3,X,2,X)	8
8	Rod Hunter	(1,1,3,1,2)	8
9	Steve Koppe	(3,2,1,X,1)	7
10	Ray Palmer	(0,0,2,2,2)	6
11	David Jackson	(1,2,2,0,1)	6
12	Steve Baker	(2,0,1,1,0)	4
13	Rudy Muts	(2,1,0,0,F)	3
14	Brent Nott	(1,1,F,X,X)	2
15	Darryl Branfort	(0,0,1,1,0)	2
16	Bill Barett	(0,X,X,0,0)	0
R1	Craig Drennan	(3,1)	4
18	Mal Bedkoper	(1)	1

=== British Final ===
- 6 June 1985
- (England) Brandon Stadium, Coventry
- First 7 to Overseas final plus 1 reserve

Placing	Rider	Total	1	2	3	4	5	6	7	8	9	10	11	12	13	14	15	16	17	18	19	20	Pts	Pos	21
1	(England) (2) Kenny Carter	15	3					3				3				3				3			15	1	
2	(England) (12) John Davis	14			3					3		2			3						3		14	2	
3	(England) (8) Kelvin Tatum	12		3						1			3			2			3				12	3	
4	(England) (9) Phil Collins	11			1		3						2					3		2			11	4	
5	(England) (6) Chris Morton	9		1				2			3							2			1		9	5	
6	(England) (16) Neil Collins	9				1				2	2						3			1			9	6	
7	(England) (3) Andy Smith	7	2						1				0				2				2		7	7	
8	(England) (5) Les Collins	6		2			0					0					1					3	6	8	3
9	(England) (13) Simon Cross	6				0	2							3		1					0		6	9	2
10	(England) (14) Neil Evitts	6				3		0					1		0							2	6	10	1
11	(England) (10) Peter Collins	5			2			1						1			E		1				5	11	
12	(England) (15) Tim Hunt	5				2			F			1						0	2				5	12	
13	(England) (11) Andy Grahame	4			0				3		0					0						1	4	13	
14	(England) (1) Dave Jessup	4	1				1				1				1				0				4	14	
15	(England) (7) Andy Campbell	4		0					2					0	2					0			4	15	
16	(England) (4) Alan Grahame	3	0							F				2				1				E	3	16	
Placing	Rider	Total	1	2	3	4	5	6	7	8	9	10	11	12	13	14	15	16	17	18	19	20	Pts	Pos	21

m - exclusion for exceeding two minute time allowance • t - exclusion for touching the tapes • x - other exclusion • e - retired or mechanical failure • f - fell • ns - non-starter • nc - non-classify

gate A - inside	gate B	gate C	gate D - outside

=== Norwegian Final ===
- 1 May 1985
- (Norway) Elgane Speedway, Varhaug
- Top 1 to Nordic final

Pos.	Rider	Total
1	Einar Kyllingstad	15
2	Roy Otto	14
3	Dag Haaland	11
4	Ingvar Skogland	11
5	Erlend Skretting	10
6	Kjel Arvid Gimre	10
7	Per Leveng	9
8	Arnt Forland	9
9	Willi Tjessem	7
10	Robert Langaland	7
11	Gjermund Aas	4
12	Aasger Bjerga	3
13	Jan Slaatter	3
14	Kurt Ueland	3
15	Geir Aasland	3
16	Gunnar Tunaem	1

=== Finland Final ===
- (Finland) Eteläpuisto, Tampere
- 12 August 1984, top 2 (+1 seeded rider) to 1985 Nordic final

Pos.	Rider	Total
1	Kai Niemi	15
2	Ari Koponen	14
3	Juha Moksunen	11+3
4	Pekka Hautamaki	11+2
5	Olli Tyrvainen	10
6	Markku Haapala	9
7	Henry Kivela	9
8	Hannu Lehtonen	8
9	Mikael Back	6
10	Seppo Keskinen	6
11	Heimo Kaikko	6
12	Aarre Soivuori	4
13	Roy Malminheimo	3
14	Aki Ala Riihimaki	3
15	Esa Mattila	2
16	Ismo Kivela	2
17	Ari Heinonen (res)	1

=== Swedish Finals ===
- (Sweden) Top 5 to Nordic final
- R1 (20 May, Örebro Motorstadion, Örebro)
- R2 (21 May, Gislaved Motorbana, Gislaved)
- R3 (22 May, Linköping Motorstadion, Linköping)

Pos.	Rider	R1	R2	R3	Total
1	Tommy Nilsson	12	15	13	40
2	Jimmy Nilsen	11	13	12	36
3	Richard Hellsén	12	10	13	35
4	Per Jonsson	8	10	15	33
5	Erik Stenlund	14	10	8	32
6	Christer Rohlén	7	10	8	25
7	Pierre Brannefors	9	12	2	23
8	Lars Andersson	9	5	7	21
9	Patrik Karlsson	4	9	6	19
10	Hans Wahlström	9	3	4	16
11	Börje Ring	3	4	8	15
12	Bengt Jansson	4	3	7	14
13	Jimmie Magnusson	1	4	8	13
14	Anders Kling	3	6	4	13
15	Ake Fridell	8	2	-	10
16	Tony Olsson	5	3	0	8
17	Conny Ivarsson	0	0	4	4
18	Jan Lundgren	0	1	1	1
19	Alf Trofast	-	1	-	1
20	Lars Mammarberg	1	-	-	1

=== Danish Final ===
- 5 May 1985
- (Denmark) Brovst Speedway Center, Brovst
- First 7 to Nordic final

Pos.	Rider	Total
1	Hans Nielsen	15
2	Erik Gundersen	13+3
3	Preben Eriksen	13+2
4	Tommy Knudsen	11
5	Finn Rune Jensen	10
6	Jan O. Pedersen	10
7	John Jørgensen	10
8	Jens Rasmussen	9
9	Fleming Pedersen	6
10	John Eskildsen	6
11	Bo Petersen	6
12	Sam Nikolajsen	3
13	Brian Jacobsen	2
14	Aksel Jepsen	2
15	Per Sorensen	2
16	Frank Andersen	1
R1	Helge Hansen	1

== Fourth round ==
=== Continental semi-finals ===
- 9 June
- (Czechoslovakia) Speedway Žarnovica, Žarnovica
- Top 8 to Continental final

Pos.	Rider	Points
1	(West Germany) Egon Müller	13
2	(West Germany) Klaus Lausch	12
3	(Italy) Armando Castagna	11
4	(Czechoslovakia) Lubomir Jedek	10
5	(Czechoslovakia) Aleš Dryml Sr.	10
6	(Poland) Grzegorz Dzikowski	10
7	(Czechoslovakia) Václav Verner	10
8	(Czechoslovakia) Petr Vandírek	9
9	(Italy) Giorgio Zaramella	7
10	(Poland) Zenon Plech	6
11	(Czechoslovakia) Stanislav Urban	6
12	(Soviet Union) Michail Starostin	4
13	(Poland) Piotr Pyszny	4
14	(Italy) Valentino Furlanetto	3
15	(Czechoslovakia) Zdeněk Schneiderwind	3
16	(Soviet Union) Oleg Volokhov	2

- 9 June
- (Hungary) Hajdú Volán Stadion, Debrecen
- Top 8 to Continental final

Pos.	Rider	Points
1	(Hungary) Zoltán Adorján	14
2	(Soviet Union) Viktor Kuznetsov	12
3	(Hungary) Sandor Tihanyi	11
4	(Hungary) Zoltan Hajdu	11
5	(Czechoslovakia) Antonín Kasper Jr.	10
6	(Austria) Heinrich Schatzer	9
7	(West Germany) Karl Maier	9
8	(Hungary) Laszlo Bodi	8
9	(Poland) Andrzej Huszcza	7
10	(Italy) Armando Dal Chiele	7
11	(Italy) Ottaviano Righetto	5
12	(Czechoslovakia) Petr Kucera	3
13	(Poland) Zdislaw Rutecki	2
14	(Netherlands) Henny Kroeze	2
15	(Soviet Union) Rif Saitgareev	2
16	(Soviet Union) Vladimir Trofimov	1

=== Overseas Final ===
- 14 July 1985
- (England) Odsal Stadium, Bradford
- First 10 to the Intercontinental Final plus 1 reserve
- David Bargh seeded direct to Overseas Final by the New Zealand Auto Cycle Union

Placing	Rider	Total	1	2	3	4	5	6	7	8	9	10	11	12	13	14	15	16	17	18	19	20	Pts	Pos	21
1	(United States) (3) Shawn Moran	14	3						3				3				3				2		14	1	3
2	(England) (2) Kenny Carter	14	2					3				3				3				3			14	2	2
3	(United States) (4) Lance King	12	0							3				3				3				3	12	3	
4	(England) (1) Andy Smith	11	1				2				3				2				3				11	4	
5	(England) (7) John Davis	11		2					2					2	3					2			11	5	
6	(England) (6) Kelvin Tatum	10		3				0			2							2			3		10	6	
7	(United States) (14) John Cook	8				3		1					2		0							2	8	7	
8	(Australia) (8) Phil Crump	8		1						2			1			2			2				8	8	
9	(United States) (10) Sam Ermolenko	7			3			2						0			1		1				7	9	
10	(England) (13) Phil Collins	6				1	3							1		1					0		6	10	3
11	(England) (12) Chris Morton	6			2					0		2			1						1		6	11	2
12	(England) (15) Neil Collins	5				2			1			1						1	0				5	12	
13	(Australia) (16) Stan Bear	5				F				1	1						2			1			5	13	
14	(New Zealand) (11) David Bargh	2			1				0		0					0						1	2	14	
15	(United States) (9) Rick Miller	1			0		1						0					E		0			1	15	
16	(England) (5) Les Collins	0		0			0					0					0					0	0	16	
Placing	Rider	Total	1	2	3	4	5	6	7	8	9	10	11	12	13	14	15	16	17	18	19	20	Pts	Pos	21

m - exclusion for exceeding two minute time allowance • t - exclusion for touching the tapes • x - other exclusion • e - retired or mechanical failure • f - fell • ns - non-starter • nc - non-classify

gate A - inside	gate B	gate C	gate D - outside

=== Nordic Final ===
- 9 June 1985
- (Denmark) Fjelsted Speedway Stadium, Harndrup
- First 6 to Intercontinental final plus 1 reserve

Placing	Rider	Total	1	2	3	4	5	6	7	8	9	10	11	12	13	14	15	16	17	18	19	20	Pts	Pos	21
1	(Denmark) (3) Tommy Knudsen	15	3						3				3				3				3		15	1	
2	(Sweden) (14) Jan Andersson	12				2		2					2		3							3	12	2	
3	(Denmark) (15) Erik Gundersen	11				3			0			3						2	3				11	3	
4	(Denmark) (10) Hans Nielsen	10			E			3						3			2		2				10	4	
5	(Finland) (1) Kai Niemi	10	2				3				3				1				1				10	5	
6	(Denmark) (11) Jan O. Pedersen	10			2				2		2					2						2	10	6	
7	(Denmark) (12) John Jørgensen	8			3					1		2			0						2		8	7	3
8	(Sweden) (4) Tommy Nilsson	8	1							3				E				3				1	8	8	2
9	(Denmark) (8) Preben Eriksen	7		2						2			E			3			0				7	9	
10	(Sweden) (7) Richard Hellsen	7		1					1					1	2					2			7	10	
11	(Sweden) (13) Per Jonsson	6				1	2							2		0					1		6	11	
12	(Norway) (2) Einar Kyllingstad	5	0					0				1				1				3			5	12	
13	(Denmark) (5) Finn Rune Jensen	5		3			1					0					1					0	5	13	
14	(Finland) (6) Ari Koponen	3		0				1			1							1			0		3	14	
15	(Sweden) (9) Erik Stenlund	2			X		0						1					0		1			2	15	
16	(Finland) (16) Olli Tyrväinen	0				0				0	0						E			0			0	16	
Placing	Rider	Total	1	2	3	4	5	6	7	8	9	10	11	12	13	14	15	16	17	18	19	20	Pts	Pos	21

m - exclusion for exceeding two minute time allowance • t - exclusion for touching the tapes • x - other exclusion • e - retired or mechanical failure • f - fell • ns - non-starter • nc - non-classify

gate A - inside	gate B	gate C	gate D - outside

== Fifth round ==
=== Continental Final ===
- 21 July 1985
- (West Germany) Rottalstadion, Pocking
- First 5 plus one reserve to the World Final

Placing	Rider	Total	1	2	3	4	5	6	7	8	9	10	11	12	13	14	15	16	17	18	19	20	Pts	Pos	21
1	(West Germany) (15) Egon Muller	14				2			3			3						3	3				14	1	
2	(Italy) (11) Armando Castagna	13			3				2		3					3						2	13	2	
3	(Hungary) (14) Zoltan Adorjan	12				3		2					3		1							3	12	3	
4	(Soviet Union) (10) Viktor Kuznetsov	11			0			3						3			3		2				11	4	3
5	(West Germany) (12) Karl Maier	11			2					2		2			3						2		11	5	2
6	(Poland) (3) Grzegorz Dzikowski	11	3						1				2				2				3		11	6	1
7	(Czechoslovakia) (8) Antonín Kasper Jr.	10		3						3			1			2			1				10	7	
8	(Czechoslovakia) (1) Petr Vandirek	8	2				2				2				2				0				8	8	
9	(Hungary) (9) Sandor Tihanyi	7			1		3						0					2		1			7	9	
10	(Czechoslovakia) (5) Aleš Dryml Sr.	6		2			1					1					1					1	6	10	
11	(West Germany) (16) Klaus Lausch	5				X				1	1						0			3			5	11	
12	(Czechoslovakia) (7) Lubomír Jedek	5		1					E					2	0					2			5	12	
13	(Austria) (13) Heinrich Schatzer	3				1	X							1		1					0		3	13	
14	(Czechoslovakia) (6) Václav Verner	2		0				1			0							1			X		2	14	
15	(Hungary) (4) Zoltan Hajdu	1	1							X				0				0				X	1	15	
16	(Hungary) (2) Laszlo Bodi	0	X					0				0				0				0			0	16	
R1	(Poland) (R1) Andrzej Huszcza	1																			1		1	R1	
R2	(Italy) (R2) Giorgio Zaramella	0								0													0	R2	
Placing	Rider	Total	1	2	3	4	5	6	7	8	9	10	11	12	13	14	15	16	17	18	19	20	Pts	Pos	21

m - exclusion for exceeding two minute time allowance • t - exclusion for touching the tapes • x - other exclusion • e - retired or mechanical failure • f - fell • ns - non-starter • nc - non-classify

gate A - inside	gate B	gate C	gate D - outside

=== Intercontinental Final ===
- 3 August 1985
- (Sweden) Vetlanda Motorstadion, Vetlanda
- First 11 plus one reserve to the World Final

Placing	Rider	Total	1	2	3	4	5	6	7	8	9	10	11	12	13	14	15	16	17	18	19	20	Pts	Pos	21
1	(United States) (2) Shawn Moran	14	3					3				3				3				2			14	1	
2	(United States) (11) Lance King	12			3				2		2					2						3	12	2	3
3	(Denmark) (9) Hans Nielsen	12			1		2						3					3		3			12	3	2
4	(Sweden) (1) Jan Andersson	11	2				3				1				3				2				11	4	
5	(Finland) (12) Kai Niemi	10			2					3		0			2						3		10	5	
6	(Denmark) (15) Tommy Knudsen	9				3			F			1						2	3				9	6	
7	(United States) (5) Sam Ermolenko	9		3			1					2					2					1	9	7	
8	(England) (3) Kelvin Tatum	8	0						3				2				1				2		8	8	
9	(United States) (7) John Cook	8		2					1					3	1					1			8	9	
10	(Denmark) (16) Erik Gundersen	7				0				1	3						3			0			7	10	
11	(Denmark) (4) Jan O. Pedersen	6	1							2				1				0				2	6	11	
12	(England) (13) Phil Collins	5				1	0							2		1					1		5	12	
13	(England) (10) John Davis	3			0			2						0			0		1				3	13	
14	(England) (14) Kenny Carter	2				2		F					-		-							-	2	14	
15	(Australia) (8) Phil Crump	2		1						0			1			0			F				2	15	
16	(England) (6) Andy Smith	2		F				1			0							1			0		2	16	
R1	(Denmark) (R1) John Jørgensen	0											0									0	0	R1	
R2	(England) (R2) Chris Morton	0													0								0	R2	
Placing	Rider	Total	1	2	3	4	5	6	7	8	9	10	11	12	13	14	15	16	17	18	19	20	Pts	Pos	21

m - exclusion for exceeding two minute time allowance • t - exclusion for touching the tapes • x - other exclusion • e - retired or mechanical failure • f - fell • ns - non-starter • nc - non-classify

gate A - inside	gate B	gate C	gate D - outside

== World Final ==
- 31 August 1985
- (England) Bradford, Odsal Stadium
- Referee: ( (Norway) ) Torrie Kittlesen

Placing	Rider	Total	1	2	3	4	5	6	7	8	9	10	11	12	13	14	15	16	17	18	19	20	Pts	Pos	21
1	(Denmark) (14) Erik Gundersen	13				1		3					3		3							3	13	1	3
2	(Denmark) (15) Hans Nielsen	13				3			3			3						1	3				13	2	2
3	(United States) (13) Sam Ermolenko	13				2	3							3		2					3		13	3	1
4	(Finland) (8) Kai Niemi	10		2						3			2			3			0				10	4	
5	(United States) (5) Shawn Moran	10		3			1					1					3					2	10	5	
6	(Denmark) (9) Tommy Knudsen	10			2		2						1					2		3			10	6	
7	(United States) (6) John Cook	9		0				2			3							3			1		9	7	
8	(England) (1) Kelvin Tatum	8	3				0				1				2				2				8	8	
9	(Denmark) (10) Jan O. Pedersen	7			3			1						1			1		1				7	9	
10	(Sweden) (12) Jan Andersson	7			1					1		2			1						2		7	10	
11	(United States) (11) Lance King	6			0				2		2					1						1	6	11	
12	(West Germany) (3) Egon Muller	5	2						1				E				2				0		5	12	
13	(Italy) (4) Armando Castagna	4	0							2				2				0				0	4	13	
14	(Hungary) (16) Zoltan Adorjan	2				0				0	0						0			2			2	14	
15	(Soviet Union) (2) Viktor Kuznetsov	2	1					0				0				0				1			2	15	
16	(West Germany) (7) Karl Maier	1		1					0					0	0					0			1	16	
R1	(Poland) (R1) Grzegorz Dzikowski	0																					0	R1	
R2	(England) (R2) Phil Collins	0																					0	R2	
Placing	Rider	Total	1	2	3	4	5	6	7	8	9	10	11	12	13	14	15	16	17	18	19	20	Pts	Pos	21

m - exclusion for exceeding two minute time allowance • t - exclusion for touching the tapes • x - other exclusion • e - retired or mechanical failure • f - fell • ns - non-starter • nc - non-classify

gate A - inside	gate B	gate C	gate D - outside
