= 1980 Individual Speedway World Championship =

Motorcycle speedway world championship season

Seasons
- ← 1979 1981 →

The 1980 Individual Speedway World Championship was the 35th edition of the official World Championship to determine the world champion rider.

With the defending Ivan Mauger failing to qualify for a World Final for the first time since 1966, and Ole Olsen only qualifying as a reserve, the 1980 World Final at the Ullevi Stadium in Gothenburg, Sweden was seen as an open final with a number of potential winners. Michael Lee, Bruce Penhall, Dave Jessup and Billy Sanders considered the favourites with Jan Andersson (the only Swedish rider in the World Final), John Davis, Hans Nielsen, Zenon Plech, Chris Morton and Peter Collins all expected to challenge.

Twenty-one-year-old English ace Lee who had only finished 7th in the Intercontinental Final at White City, won his only World Championship with 14 points from his 5 rides. Dave Jessup finished second after defeating Billy Sanders in a runoff when both riders finished on 12 points to give England a 1-2 finish in a World Final.

Michael Lee became only the fifth rider from Great Britain to win speedway's ultimate individual prize, joining Welshman Freddie Williams (1950), and fellow Englishmen Tommy Price (1949), Peter Craven (1955 & 1962) and Peter Collins (1976) as a speedway world champion.

== First round ==
=== British Qualification ===
Date	Venue	Winner	2nd	3rd
Preliminary Round
8 April	Milton Keynes Stadium, Milton Keynes	Mike Lanham	Rob Hollingworth	David Kennett
9 April	Long Eaton Stadium, Long Eaton	Dave Perks	Dave Morton	Paul Woods
11 April	East of England Arena, Peterborough	Andy Hines	Nicky Allott	Nigel Flatman
11 April	Ellesmere Port Stadium, Ellesmere Port	Peter Prinsloo	Derek Richardson	David Gagen
13 April	Rye House Stadium, Hoddesdon	Melvyn Taylor	Bob Garrad	Ian Clark
Quarter-Final
27 April	The Shay, Halifax	Mike Lanham	Kevin Hawkins	Dave Morton

== Second round ==
=== Swedish qualification ===
- Top 5 in each heat to Swedish final

(4 May, Målilla (Motorbana) Målilla)
Pos	Rider	Points
1	Tommy Johansson	15
2	Tommy Nilsson	14
3	Conny Samuelsson	11
4	Bengt Jansson	11
5	Gert Carlsson	11
6	Per-Ove Gudmundsson	10+3
7	Stefan Salmonsson	10+2
8	Tommy Steen	8
9	Kalle Lindgren	8
10	Torgil Roth	4
11	Peter Carlsson	4
12	Willy Karlsson	3
13	Leif Bergqvist (res)	3
14	Bertil Andersson (res)	3
15	Glenn Andersson	2
16	Lars-Ove Lundgren	1
17	Alf Trofast	0
18	Sven-Erik Andersson	0

(4 May, Gislaved Motorbana Gislaved)
Pos	Rider	Points
1	Anders Michanek	15
2	Bo Wirebrand	13
3	Hans Danielsson	12
4	Lillebror Johansson	12
5	Bengt Gustavsson	12
6	Karl-Erik Claesson	10
7	Thomas Hydling	9
8	Benny Ekberg	8
9	Lennart Bengtsson	6
10	Åke Axelsson	6
11	Börje Ring	5
12	Åke Fridell	4
13	Weine Ström	4
14	Anders Eriksson	2
15	Thomas Engman	2
16	Kent Bäär	0

(8 May, Linköping Motorstadion Linköping)
Pos	Rider	Points
1	Bernt Persson	15
2	Richard Hellsén	14
3	Börje Klingberg	12
4	Jan Ericsson	11
5	Rolf Sundberg	11
6	Uno Johansson	10
7	Jan Davidsson	10
8	Ingemar Andersson	8
9	Christer Nilsson	6
10	Sören Karlsson	5
11	Kent Eriksson	5
12	Peter Johansson	4
13	Anders Törnström	4
14	Ragnar Holm	3
15	Göran Waltersson	2
16	Bo Åstrand	1
17	Leif Andersson	0

=== Continental Preliminary round ===
Date	Venue	Winner	2nd	3rd
19 April	(West Germany) Ellermühle Stadium, Landshut	(West Germany) Egon Muller	(West Germany) Waldemar Bacik	(Poland) Edward Jancarz
20 April	(Poland) Polonia Bydgoszcz Stadium, Bydgoszcz	(Czechoslovakia) Zdeněk Kudrna	(Poland) Jerzy Rembas	(Poland) Marek Ziarnik
20 April	(Italy) Giavera del Montello, Treviso	(Czechoslovakia) Milan Špinka	(Czechoslovakia) Václav Verner	(Austria) Herbert Szerecz
20 April	(Czech Republic) Speedway Žarnovica, Žarnovica	(Czechoslovakia) Petr Ondrašík	(Czechoslovakia) Jan Hadek	(Czechoslovakia) Petr Kučera

=== Australian Final ===
- 26 January 1980
- (Australia) Sydney Showground, Sydney
- First 9 to Australasian Final

Pos.	Rider	Total
1	Billy Sanders	15
2	Phil Crump	12+3
3	John Titman	12+2
4	Steve Koppe	10
5	Mike Farrell	10
6	Phil Herne	10
7	Glyn Taylor	9
8	Glenn McDonald	9
9	Keith Wright	7
10	Rob Maxfield	6
11	Peter Collins	4
12	Lou Sansom	3
13	Danny Kennedy	2
14	Rob Moores	2
15	Alan Lorymer	2
16	Dean Van Bibra	1

=== New Zealand Final ===
- 2 February 1980
- (New Zealand) Western Springs Stadium, Auckland
- First 7 to Australasian Final

Pos.	Rider	Heat Scores	Total
1	Larry Ross	3,3,2,3,3	14
2	David Bargh	3,3,3,3,2	14
3	Tony Briggs	2,3,2,2,3	12
4	Graeme Stapleton	3,2,3,2,1	11
5	Mitch Shirra	1,3,1,3,3	11
6	Wayne Brown	3,2,3,3,-	11
7	Mike Fullerton	2,1,1,2,3	9
8	Colin Tucker	2,0,2,1,2	7
9	Roger Wright	1,2,3,1,0	7
10	Max Brown	0,2,2,1,1	6
11	Neil Abrahams	2,1,0,0,2	5
12	Greg Joynt	1,1,1,2,x	5
13	Colin Farquharson	1,F,0,0,2	3
14	Greame Beardsley	0,F,1,-,-	1
15	Paul Fewings	F,1,F,-,-	1
16	James Moore	E,0,-,-,-	0
R1	William Aulsfold	0,0,1,1	2
R2	Roger Pauling	0,0	0

=== British semi-finals ===
- 21 May
- (England) Wimborne Road, Poole
- Top 8 to British final

Pos.	Rider	Points
1	Peter Collins	15
2	Gordon Kennett	13
3	Kevin Jolly	13
4	Reg Wilson	10
5	John Davis	9
6	John Louis	9
7	Melvyn Taylor	8
8	Mike Lanham	7
9	Alan Grahame	7
10	Kevin Hawkins	6
11	Nigel Flatman	6
12	Roger Johns	6
13	Paul Woods	6
14	Alan Molyneux	0
15	Jim McMillan	0

- 22 May
- (England) Owlerton Stadium, Sheffield
- Top 8 to British final

Pos.	Rider	Points
1	Dave Jessup	14
2	Chris Morton	11
3	Dave Morton	11
4	Peter Prinsloo	11
5	Michael Lee	9
6	Bobby Beaton	9
7	Ian Cartwright	8
8	Phil Collins	8
9	Les Collins	7
10	Kenny Carter	7
11	Steve Bastable	7
12	Joe Owen	6
13	Malcolm Simmons	6
14	Andy Grahame	3
15	Bobby Garrad	2
16	Ian Clark	1

== Third round ==
=== Continental quarter-finals ===
- Top 32 to Continental semi-finals

Date	Venue	Winner	2nd	3rd
3 May	(Czechoslovakia) Slaný Speedway Stadium, Slaný	(Soviet Union) Mikhail Starostin	(Czechoslovakia) Jiří Štancl	(Czechoslovakia) Jan Verner
4 May	(Socialist Federal Republic of Yugoslavia) Mladost Stadium, Prelog	(Netherlands) Henny Kroeze	(Czechoslovakia) Václav Verner	(Czechoslovakia) Milan Špinka
4 May	(Austria) Stadion Wiener Neustadt	(Czechoslovakia) Zdeněk Kudrna	(Poland) Jerzy Rembas	(Poland) Piotr Pyszny

=== Swedish Final ===
- 20 May 1980
- (Sweden) Norrköping Motorstadion, Norrköping
- Winner to World Final, riders 2–5 to Nordic Final

Placing	Rider	Total	1	2	3	4	5	6	7	8	9	10	11	12	13	14	15	16	17	18	19	20	Pts	Pos
1	(Sweden) (13) Jan Andersson	13				2	3							3		2					3		13	1
2	(Sweden) (15) Richard Hellsen	12				3			3			3						X	3				12	2
3	(Sweden) (2) Tommy Johansson	12	2					3				2				3				2			12	3
4	(Sweden) (8) Anders Michanek	11		3						3			2			1			2				11	4
5	(Sweden) (14) Bernt Persson	11				1		2					3		2							3	11	5
6	(Sweden) (9) Bengt Jansson	10			1		2						1					3		3			10	6
7	(Sweden) (11) Tommy Nilsson	9			2				2		3					0						2	9	7
8	(Sweden) (16) Borje Klingberg	7				0				1	2						3			1			7	8
9	(Sweden) (1) Hans Danielsson	7	1				1				1				3				1				7	9
10	(Sweden) (10) Rolf Sundberg	6			3			X						1			2		0				6	10
11	(Sweden) (6) Per-Ove Gundmundsson	6		2				1			0							1			2		6	11
12	(Sweden) (4) Bo Wirebrand	5	3							0				2				X				-	5	12
13	(Sweden) (7) Conny Samuelsson	3		1					1					0	1					0			3	13
14	(Sweden) (12) Lillebror Johansson	2			0					2		E			-						-		2	14
15	(Sweden) (5) Bengt Gustavsson	1		0			0					1					0					0	1	15
16	(Sweden) (3) Jan Eriksson	0	E						F				F				-				-		0	16
R1	(Sweden) (R1) Karl-Erik Claesson	4													0			2			1	1	4	R1
R2	(Sweden) (R2) Uno Johansson	1															1				0		1	R2
Placing	Rider	Total	1	2	3	4	5	6	7	8	9	10	11	12	13	14	15	16	17	18	19	20	Pts	Pos

m - exclusion for exceeding two minute time allowance • t - exclusion for touching the tapes • x - other exclusion • e - retired or mechanical failure • f - fell • ns - non-starter • nc - non-classify

gate A - inside	gate B	gate C	gate D - outside

=== Finland Final ===
- (Finland) Eteläpuisto, Tampere
- 27 August 1979, top 3 to 1980 Nordic final

Pos.	Rider	Total
1	Kai Niemi	12
2	Ilkka Teromaa	9
3	Veijo Tuoriniemi	9
4	Ari Koponen	8
5	Seppo Palomaki	8
6	Olli Turkia	8
7	Esko Myllari	8
8	Timo Kiansten	7
9	Pekka Hautamaki	6
10	Hannu Lehtonen	6
11	Heimo Kaikko	4
12	Markku Haapala	4
13	Veli Pekka Kunelius	3
14	Olli Tyrvainen	3
15	Ismo Kivela	2
16	Jarmo Puttonen	0
17	Matti Hyyrylainen (res)	0

=== Danish Final ===
- 4 May 1980
- (Denmark) Fredericia Speedway Stadium, Fredericia
- First 3 to Nordic final (Olsen, Nielsen & Thomsen seeded through)

Pos.	Rider	Total
1	Bo Petersen	15
2	Preben Eriksen	13
3	Bent Rasmussen	12+3
4	Finn Rune Jensen	12+2
5	Finn Thomsen	10
6	Mike Lohmann	8
7	Alf Busk	8
8	Jens Henry Nielsen	7
9	Lars Vinding	6
10	Arne Cruse	6
11	Gunnar Hansen	6
12	Finn Lundahl	5
13	Steen Mastrup	5
14	Hans Ove Cristiansen	3
15	Svend Lund	3
16	Gunnar Svendsen	1

=== Norwegian Final ===
- 18 May 1980
- (Norway) Geiteryggen Speedwaybane, Skien
- First 3 to Nordic final

Pos.	Rider	Total
1	Reidar Eide	14
2	Audun Ove Olsen	13
3	Rolf Gramstad	12+3
4	Dag Haaland	12+2
5	Trond Helge Skretting	10
6	Terje Tollefsen	8
7	Sigvart Pedersen	7
8	Kjell Gimre	7
9	Jon Hovind	6
10	Roy Otto	6
11	Jorn Haugvaldstad	6
12	Toralf Holen	6
13	Asgeir Bjerga	4
14	Geir Aasland	4
15	Rolf Havirstad	2
16	Dagvinn Jorgensen	2

=== Australasian Final ===
- 2 February 1980
- (New Zealand) Ruapuna Speedway, Christchurch
- First 5 to Commonwealth Final plus 1 reserve
- Ivan Mauger seeded to Commonwealth final

Placing	Rider	Total	1	2	3	4	5	6	7	8	9	10	11	12	13	14	15	16	17	18	19	20	Pts	Pos	21
1	(Australia) (10) Billy Sanders	15			3			3						3			3		3				15	1	
2	(Australia) (1) John Titman	13	3				3				2				3				2				13	2	
3	(New Zealand) (16) Larry Ross	12				3				3	3						2			1			12	3	
4	(New Zealand) (2) Mitch Shirra	12	2					2				3				3				2			12	4	
5	(Australia) (4) Phil Crump	11	1							2				2				3				3	11	5	3
6	(New Zealand) (7) Tony Briggs	11		2					3					1	2					3			11	6	2
7	(Australia) (6) Mike Farrell	10		3				1			1							2			3		10	7	
8	(Australia) (14) Phil Herne	8				2		0					3		1							2	8	8	
9	(Australia) (3) Steve Koppe	7	0						2				2				1				2		7	9	
10	(Australia) (11) Glyn Taylor	5			2				1		0					2						0	5	10	
11	(Australia) (5) Gleen McDonald	5		0			2					2					0					1	5	11	
12	(New Zealand) (15) Graeme Stapleton	3				1			0			0						1	1				3	12	
13	(Australia) (13) Keith Wright	2				0	1							0		0					1		2	13	
14	(New Zealand) (9) David Bargh	2			1		0						1					0		0			2	14	
15	(New Zealand) (8) Mike Fullerton	2		1						0			0			1			0				2	15	
16	(New Zealand) (12) Wayne Brown	1			0					1		0			0						0		1	16	
Placing	Rider	Total	1	2	3	4	5	6	7	8	9	10	11	12	13	14	15	16	17	18	19	20	Pts	Pos	21

m - exclusion for exceeding two minute time allowance • t - exclusion for touching the tapes • x - other exclusion • e - retired or mechanical failure • f - fell • ns - non-starter • nc - non-classify

gate A - inside	gate B	gate C	gate D - outside

=== British Final ===
- 4 June 1980
- (England) Brandon Stadium, Coventry
- First 10 to Commonwealth Final plus 1 reserve

Pos.	Rider	Heat Scores	Total
1	Dave Jessup	(3,3,3,3,3)	15
2	Michael Lee	(3,3,3,3,2)	14
3	Phil Collins	(1,2,2,3,3)	11
4	Peter Collins	(3,3,0,3,1)	10
5	Gordon Kennett	(2,2,2,2,2)	10
6	John Louis	(3,1,3,1,1)	9
7	John Davis	(X,2,1,2,3)	8
8	Chris Morton	(0,1,1,2,3)	7
9	Melvyn Taylor	(2,1,X,2,2)	7
10	Reg Wilson	(2,2,1,1,0)	6+3
11	Bobby Beaton	(0,1,3,0,2)	6+2
12	Ian Cartwright	(1,0,2,1,1)	5
13	Dave Morton	(1,3,0,0,0)	4
14	Kevin Jolly	(2,0,1,0,1)	4
15	Peter Prinsloo	(2,1,0,1,0)	4
16	Mike Lanham	(0,0,0,0,0)	0

== Fourth round ==
=== Continental semi-finals ===
- 25 May
- (West Germany) Motodrom Halbemond, Norden
- Top 8 to Continental final

Pos.	Rider	Points
1	(Czechoslovakia) Jiří Štancl	14
2	(Poland) Edward Jancarz	12
3	(Czechoslovakia) Petr Ondrašík	11
4	(Poland) Andrzej Huszcza	11
5	(West Germany) Egon Müller	10
6	(Poland) Zenon Plech	10
7	(Soviet Union) Nikolaj Kornev	9
8	(Soviet Union) Michail Starostin	9
9	(West Germany) Waldemar Bacik	8
10	(Czechoslovakia) Petr Kucera	6
11	(Poland) Roman Jankowski	5
12	(Soviet Union) Valerij Gordeev	4
13	(Czechoslovakia) Jan Hadek	4
14	(Czechoslovakia) Jan Verner	3
15	(Czechoslovakia) Ladislav Hradecky	2
16	(Soviet Union) Zytun Gafurov	1

- 25 May
- (Bulgaria) Targovishte Speedway Stadium, Targovishte
- Top 8 to Continental final

Pos.	Rider	Points
1	(Czechoslovakia) Zdenek Kudrna	13
2	(Czechoslovakia) Václav Verner	13
3	(Czechoslovakia) Aleš Dryml Sr.	11
4	(Poland) Jerzy Rembas	10
5	(Czechoslovakia) Milan Špinka	9
6	(England) Andy Cusworth	6
7	(Poland) Wojciech Zabialowicz	8+3
8	(West Germany) Georg Hack	8+2
9	(Poland) Henny Kroeze	8+1
10	(Austria) Herbert Szerecz	7
11	(Soviet Union) Grigory Khlinovsky	7
12	(Soviet Union) Sergej Denisov	6
13	(Poland) Piotr Pyszny	4
14	(Poland) Walter Grubmüller	3
15	(Netherlands) Frits Koppe	1
16	(Poland) Marek Ciarnik (res)	0

=== Commonwealth Final ===
- 29 June 1980
- (England) Wimbledon Stadium, London
- First 9 to Intercontinental Final plus 1 reserve

Placing	Rider	Total	1	2	3	4	5	6	7	8	9	10	11	12	13	14	15	16	17	18	19	20	Pts	Pos	21
1	(England) (2) Dave Jessup	14	3					2				3				3				3			14	1	
2	(England) (14) John Louis	13				2		3					2		3							3	13	2	
3	(New Zealand) (3) Ivan Mauger	12	2						3				1				3				3		12	3	
4	(England) (8) John Davis	11		1						2			3			2			3				11	4	
5	(Australia) (9) Billy Sanders	10			3		3						0					3		1			10	5	
6	(England) (4) Chris Morton	11	0							3				3				3				2	11	6	
7	(England) (5) Michael Lee	9		3			2					2					1					1	9	7	
8	(New Zealand) (7) Mitch Shirra	9		2					2					1	2					2			9	8	
9	(England) (10) Peter Collins	7			1			0						3			2		1				7	9	
10	(England) (15) Gordon Kennett	6				3			1			1						1	0				6	10	3
11	(New Zealand) (1) Larry Ross	6	1				1				1				1				2				6	11	E
12	(England) (12) Phil Collins	5			2					1		0			0						2		5	12	
13	(Australia) (6) John Titman	4		0				1			3							0			E		4	13	
14	(England) (11) Melvyn Taylor	3			F				0		2					1						0	3	14	
15	(Australia) (13) Phil Crump	2				1	0							0		0					1		2	15	
16	(England) (16) Reg Wilson	0				0				0	0						0			0			0	16	
Placing	Rider	Total	1	2	3	4	5	6	7	8	9	10	11	12	13	14	15	16	17	18	19	20	Pts	Pos	21

m - exclusion for exceeding two minute time allowance • t - exclusion for touching the tapes • x - other exclusion • e - retired or mechanical failure • f - fell • ns - non-starter • nc - non-classify

gate A - inside	gate B	gate C	gate D - outside

=== American Final ===
- 16 November 1979
- (United States) Anaheim Stadium, Anaheim
- First 2 to Intercontinental Final

Pos.	Rider	Total
1	Bruce Penhall	14
2	Scott Autrey	13+3
3	Dennis Sigalos	13+2
4	Ron Preston	13+1
5	Shawn Moran	10
6	Gene Woods	10
7	John Cook	9
8	Mike Faria	7
9	Bobby Schwartz	5
10	Alan Christian	5
11	Denny Pyeatt	5
12	Duane Yarrow	5
13	Brad Oxley	4
14	John Santona	4
15	Dan McNeill	3
16	Kelly Moran	1
17	Larry Kosta	0

=== Nordic Final ===
- 15 June 1980
- (Norway) Geiteryggen Speedwaybane, Skien
- First 5 to Intercontinental Final

Pos.	Rider	Total
1	(Denmark) Hans Nielsen	15
2	(Denmark) Ole Olsen	14
3	(Denmark) Finn Thomsen	13
4	(Denmark) Bent Rasmussen	12
5	(Finland) Kai Niemi	10
6	(Finland) Ila Teromaa	8
7	(Denmark) Bo Petersen	8
8	(Sweden) Hans Danielsson	7
9	(Sweden) Tommy Johansson	7
10	(Denmark) Preben Eriksen	6
11	(Norway) Rolf Gramstad	5
12	(Sweden) Bernt Persson	5
13	(Finland) Veijo Tyoriniemi	4
14	(Norway) Audun Ove Olsen	2
15	(Norway) Reidar Eide	1
16	(Sweden) Bengt Jansson	0

== Fifth round ==
=== Continental Final ===
- 27 July 1980
- (Italy) Santa Marina Stadium, Lonigo
- First 5 to World Final plus 1 reserve

Placing	Rider	Total	1	2	3	4	5	6	7	8	9	10	11	12	13	14	15	16	17	18	19	20	Pts	Pos	
1	(Poland) (16) Zenon Plech	14				3				3	3						3			2			14	1	3
2	(Czechoslovakia) (13) Jiří Štancl	14				2	3							3		3					3		14	2	2
3	(Czechoslovakia) (7) Aleš Dryml Sr.	12		1					3					2	3					3			12	3	
4	(West Germany) (1) Egon Müller	11	3				1				2				2				3				11	4	
5	(Czechoslovakia) (5) Petr Ondrašík	11		2			2					2					2					3	11	5	
6	(Czechoslovakia) (6) Václav Verner	9		3				1			1							2			2		9	6	
7	(Soviet Union) (4) Mikhail Starostin	7	2							2				F				3				E	7	7	
8	(Poland) (8) Jerzy Rembas	7		X						1			3			1			2				7	8	
9	(West Germany) (14) Georg Hack	7				1		2					2		F							2	7	9	
10	(Czechoslovakia) (11) Milan Špinka	6			3				2		0					0						1	6	10	
11	(Czechoslovakia) (10) Zdeněk Kudrna	6			X			3						1			1		1				6	11	
12	(Poland) (2) Andrzej Huszcza	6	F					E				3				2				1			6	12	
13	(West Germany) (3) Andy Cusworth	3	1						0				1				0				1		3	13	
14	(Poland) (12) Wojciech Żabiałowicz	2			1					0		0			1						F		2	14	
15	(Soviet Union) (15) Nikolay Kornev	2				0			1			1						E	F				2	15	
16	(Poland) (9) Edward Jancarz	0			F		-						-					-					0	16	
Placing	Rider	Total	1	2	3	4	5	6	7	8	9	10	11	12	13	14	15	16	17	18	19	20	Pts	Pos	

m - exclusion for exceeding two minute time allowance • t - exclusion for touching the tapes • x - other exclusion • e - retired or mechanical failure • f - fell • ns - non-starter • nc - non-classify

gate A - inside	gate B	gate C	gate D - outside

=== Intercontinental Final ===
- 3 August 1980
- (England) White City Stadium, London
- First 10 to World Final plus 1 reserve

Placing	Rider	Total	1	2	3	4	5	6	7	8	9	10	11	12	13	14	15	16	17	18	19	20	Pts	Pos	
1	(England) (1) Chris Morton	12	2				1				3				3				3				12	1	3
2	(United States) (5) Bruce Penhall	12		3			3					1					3					2	12	2	2
3	(Australia) (15) Billy Sanders	11				1			3			3						2	2				11	3	3
4	(Finland) (3) Kai Niemi	11	3						2				2				1				3		11	4	2
5	(Denmark) (16) Finn Thomsen	10				2				2	1						2			3			10	5	
6	(England) (8) Dave Jessup	9		2						3			E			3			1				9	6	
7	(England) (13) Michael Lee	9				3	0							3		1					2		9	7	
8	(England) (9) John Davis	9			1		2						3					1		2			9	8	
9	(Denmark) (4) Hans Nielsen	8	1							1				X				3				3	8	9	
10	(England) (2) Peter Collins	7	0					3				2				2				0			7	10	
11	(Denmark) (7) Ole Olsen	6		1					1					2	1					1			6	11	
12	(United States) (11) Scott Autrey	6			3				0		2					0						1	6	12	
13	(New Zealand) (14) Ivan Mauger	5				0		2					1		2							0	5	13	
14	(England) (12) John Louis	3			2					0		0			0						1		3	14	
15	(New Zealand) (6) Mitch Shirra	1		0				1			0							0			0		1	15	
16	(Denmark) (10) Bent Leif Rasmussen	0			0			0						X			E		-				0	16	
R1	(England) (R1) Gordon Kennett	0																	0				0	R1	
Placing	Rider	Total	1	2	3	4	5	6	7	8	9	10	11	12	13	14	15	16	17	18	19	20	Pts	Pos	

m - exclusion for exceeding two minute time allowance • t - exclusion for touching the tapes • x - other exclusion • e - retired or mechanical failure • f - fell • ns - non-starter • nc - non-classify

gate A - inside	gate B	gate C	gate D - outside

== World Final ==
- 5 September 1980
- (Sweden) Ullevi, Gothenburg
- Referee: ( (Norway) ) Torrie Kittlesen
- Attendance: 35,000 (approx)

Placing	Rider	Total	1	2	3	4	5	6	7	8	9	10	11	12	13	14	15	16	17	18	19	20	Pts	Pos	21
1	(England) (9) Michael Lee	14			2		3						3					3		3			14	1	
2	(England) (10) Dave Jessup	12			3			2						2			2		3				12	2	3
3	(Australia) (13) Billy Sanders	12				3	1							3		2					3		12	3	2
4	(Sweden) (5) Jan Andersson	11		3			0					2					3					3	11	4	
5	(United States) (1) Bruce Penhall	9	3				2				1				1				2				9	5	
6	(England) (2) John Davis	9	2					1				1				3				2			9	6	
7	(England) (11) Peter Collins	8			1				3		3					1						0	8	7	
8	(Finland) (12) Kai Niemi	8			0					1		3			2						2		8	8	
9	(England) (7) Chris Morton	8		2					1					1	3					1			8	9	
10	(Denmark) (14) Finn Thomsen	7				2		3					1		0							1	7	10	
11	(Denmark) (4) Hans Nielsen	7	1							2				0				2				2	7	11	
12	(Czechoslovakia) (8) Aleš Dryml Sr.	5		0						3			2			0			0				5	12	
13	(Czechoslovakia) (15) Jiří Štancl	5				1			2			0						1	1				5	13	
14	(West Germany) (6) Egon Muller	4		1				0			2							E			1		4	14	
15	(Poland) (16) Zenon Plech	1				E				0	0						1			0			1	15	
16	(Czechoslovakia) (3) Petr Ondrašík	0	0						0				0				0				0		0	16	
R1	(Denmark) (R1) Ole Olsen	0																					0	R1	
R2	(Czechoslovakia) (R2) Václav Verner	0																					0	R2	
R3	(Sweden) (R3) Hans Danielsson	0																					0	R3	
Placing	Rider	Total	1	2	3	4	5	6	7	8	9	10	11	12	13	14	15	16	17	18	19	20	Pts	Pos	21

m - exclusion for exceeding two minute time allowance • t - exclusion for touching the tapes • x - other exclusion • e - retired or mechanical failure • f - fell • ns - non-starter • nc - non-classify

gate A - inside	gate B	gate C	gate D - outside
