= 1984 Speedway World Team Cup =

25th edition of the annual motorcycle speedway World Cup competition

Seasons
- ← 1983 1985 →

The 1984 Speedway World Team Cup was the 25th edition of the FIM Speedway World Team Cup to determine the team world champions.

The final took place at the Stadion Alfreda Smoczyka, in Leszno, Poland. Denmark easily won their fourth title, winning by 20 clear points in the final.

== Qualification stage 1 ==
=== Scandinavian & Commonwealth rounds ===
- Scandinavia (1st & 2nd to Intercontinental Final)
- (Finland) Eteläpuisto, Tampere
- 27 May
- Commonwealth (1st & 2nd to Intercontinental Final)
- (England) King's Lynn Stadium, King's Lynn
- 15 May

Pos.	National team	Pts.	Riders
1st	Denmark	37	Hans Nielsen - 11; Preben Eriksen - 9 Erik Gundersen - 9 Bo Petersen - 8 Peter Ravn - 0
2nd	Sweden	34	Jan Andersson - 11; Bjorn Andersson - 9 Pierre Brannefors - 9 Tommy Nilsson - 5 Per Jonsson - 0
3rd	Finland	22	Kai Niemi - 8 Ari Koponen - 7 Pekka Hautamaki - 4 Olli Tyrväinen - 3 Seppo Keskinen - 0
4	Norway	3	Ingvar Skogland - 3 Einar Kyllingstad - 0 Tormod Langli - 0 Roy Otto - 0 Arne Svendse - NS

Pos.	National team	Pts.	Riders
1st	United States	34	1.Bobby Schwartz - 5 (1,2,2,0); 2.Dennis Sigalos - 12 (3,3,3,3); 3.Lance King - 5 (f,3,1,1); 4.Shawn Moran - 11 (3,3,3,2); 17.John Cook - 1 (1,-,-,-)
2nd	England	32	9.Michael Lee - 8 (2,0,3,3); 10.Chris Morton - 5 (2,2,1,-); 11.Simon Wigg - 10 (2,3,2,3); 12.Dave Jessup - 1 (1,-,-,-); 19.John Louis - 8 (-,2,3,3\0)
3rd	Australia	25	13.Billy Sanders - 8 (3,1,2,2); 14.Phil Crump - 7 (2,1,2,2); 15.John Titman - 0 (0,-,-,-); 16.Gary Guglielmi - 8 (3,2,1,2); 20.Steve Regeling - 2 (-,1,1,e)
4	New Zealand	5	5.Larry Ross - 1 (0,0,0,1); 6.Mitch Shirra - 2 (f,1,x,1); 7.Ivan Mauger - 0 (0,0,0,-); 8.David Bargh - 1 (1,0,0,0); 18.Alan Mason - 1 (-,-,-,1)

=== Continental rounds ===
- quarter final (1st & 2nd to Continental Semi-Final)
- (Italy) Santa Marina Stadium, Lonigo
- 27 May
- Att: 2,000
- quarter final (1st & 2nd to Continental Semi-Final)
- (Hungary) Borsod Volán Stadion, Miskolc
- 27 May

Pos.	National team	Pts.	Riders
1st	West Germany	28	Josef Aigner - 12; Klaus Lausch - 7 Karl Maier - 7 Stefan Deser - 3
2nd	Italy	28	Armando Castagna - 9 Armando Dal Chiele - 9 Giorgio Zaramella - 6 Gianni Famari - 4 Ottaviano Righetto - 0
3rd	Austria	24	Adi Funk - 9 Walter Nebel - 6 Hubert Fischbacher - 5 Siegfried Eder - 2 Robert Funk - 2
4	Yugoslavia	14	Zdravko Tomanic - 5 Kreso Omerzel - 4 Zvonko Pavlic - 4 Joze Zibert - 1

Pos.	National team	Pts.	Riders
1st	Czechoslovakia	37	Aleš Dryml Sr. - 12; Petr Ondrašík - 11; Antonín Kasper Jr. - 7 Václav Verner - 6 Jiri Svoboda - 1
2nd	Hungary	32	Peter Berecz - 11; József Petrikovics - 6 Josef Sziraczki - 6 Sándor Tihanyi - 6 Janos Oresko - 3
3rd	Netherlands	15	Henny Kroeze - 7 Frits Koppe - 4 Ralph Geurtz - 2 Henk Steman - 1 Wil Stroes - 1
4	Bulgaria	12	Orlin Janakiev - 4 Rudolf Valentinov - 4 Nikolai Manev - 3 Vesselin Markov - 1 Angel Eftimov - 0

Semi finals

- (1st & 2nd to Continental Final)
- (Czechoslovakia) Svítkov Stadium, Prague
- 24 June
- Ref : R Cheladze (Pol)

Pos.	National team	Pts.	Riders
1st	Czechoslovakia	37	1.Jiří Štancl - 9; 2.Aleš Dryml Sr. - 10; 3.Petr Ondrašík - 9; 4.Václav Verner - 9; 17.Antonín Kasper Jr. - NS
2nd	West Germany	27	5.Egon Müller - 8; 6.Karl Maier - 11; 7.Josef Aigner - 5; 8.Klaus Lausch - 3; 18.Peter Wurtele - NS
3rd	Hungary	17	13.József Petrikovics - 2; 14.Zoltán Adorján - 8; 15.Zoltan Hajdu - 6; 16.Sándor Tihanyi - 2; 20.Istvan Rusz - 0
4	Italy	15	9.Armando Dal Chiele - 4; 10.Armando Castagna - 6; 11.Gianni Famari - 3; 12.Giorgio Zaramella - 1; 19.Valentino Furlanetto - 1

== Qualification stage 2 ==
=== Intercontinental final ===
- (Winner to Final ; 2nd & 3rd to Continental Final)
- (Sweden) Grevby Motorstadion, Mariestad
- 23 June
- Ref: Graham Brodie (GB)
- Att: 2,499

Pos.	National team	Pts.	Riders
1st	United States	41	Lance King - 11; Shawn Moran - 11; Bobby Schwartz - 10; Kelly Moran - 6 John Cook - 3
2nd	Denmark	32	Erik Gundersen - 9 Hans Nielsen - 5 Bo Petersen - 5 Preben Eriksen - 4
3rd	England	18	Simon Wigg - 8 Peter Collins - 4 Chris Morton - 4 Phil Collins - 1 John Louis - 1
4	Sweden	13	Jan Andersson - 5 Per Jonsson - 5 Pierre Brannefors - 2 Bjorn Andersson - 1 Tommy Nilsson - 0

=== Continental final ===
- (1st & 2nd to Final)
- (West Germany) Rottalstadion, Pocking
- 8 July
- Att: 5,000
- Ref: Sam Bass (Aus)

Pos.	National team	Pts.	Riders
1st	Denmark	34	Hans Nielsen - 8 (2,3,1,2); Bo Petersen - 8 (3,3,1,1); Erik Gundersen - 10 (1,3,3,3); Preben Eriksen - 0 (0,-,-,-); Peter Ravn - 8 (-,2,3,3)
2nd	England	27	Phil Collins - 11 (3,3,3,2); Simon Wigg - 5 (1,2,0,2); Chris Morton - 5 (2,2,1,x); Peter Collins - 6 (3,1,2,0); Andy Grahame - NS
3rd	Czechoslovakia	19	Václav Verner - 2 (1,1,0,0); Petr Ondrašík - 1 (0,0,-,1); Jiří Štancl - 8 (3,0,3,2); Aleš Dryml Sr. - 8 (2,1,2,3); Antonín Kasper Jr. - 0 (-,-,0,-)
4	West Germany	16	Egon Müller - 5 (0,e,2,3); Karl Maier - 5 (2,1,1,1); Klaus Lausch - 3 (0,2,0,1); Peter Wurtele - 3 (1,e,2,x); Georg Hack - NS

== World final ==
- (Poland) Alfred Smoczyk Stadium, Leszno
- 18 August
- Att: 40,000
- Ref : C Ringstrom (Swe)

Pos.	National team	Pts.	Riders
1st	Denmark	44	5.Bo Petersen - 12 (3,3,3,3); 6.Erik Gundersen - 12 (3,3,3,3); 7.Preben Eriksen - 9 (2,3,3,1); 8.Hans Nielsen - 11 (2,3,3,3); 18.Peter Ravn - NS
2nd	England	24	13.Chris Morton - 4 (0,1,2,1); 14.Peter Collins - 2 (2,0,0,-); 15.Simon Wigg - 9 (3,2,1,3); 16.Phil Collins - 7 (1,2,2,2); 20.Neil Collins - 2 (-,-,-,2)
3rd	United States	20	9.Bobby Schwartz - 2 (1,-,1,-); 10.Shawn Moran - 6 (3,1,1,1); 11.Kelly Moran - 5 (1,2,x,2); 12.Lance King - 5 (0,2,2,1); 19.John Cook - 2 (-,0,-,2)
4	Poland	8	1.Roman Jankowski - 1 (0,1,0,x); 2.Zenon Kasprzak - 1 (0,-,1,-); 3.Zenon Plech - 4 (2,0,2,f); 4.Leonard Raba - 2 (1,1,0,0); 17.Boleslaw Proch - 0 (-,0,-,f)

== See also ==
- 1984 Individual Speedway World Championship
- 1984 Speedway World Pairs Championship
