= British League Pairs Championship =

Speedway competition in Britain

- Sport: motorcycle speedway
- Founded: 1976
- Folded: 1987
- Country: United Kingdom

Notes
- replaced by the Elite League Pairs Championship

The British League Pairs Championship was a motorcycle speedway contest between the top two riders from each club competing in the British League in the United Kingdom, or the top division thereof when it had multiple divisions.

== History ==
The meetings comprised a competition between teams of two riders, in some years with qualification for the final via two semi-finals. The competition was first staged in 1976, when Ipswich Witches won, but was dropped from the speedway calendar after the 1978 final. The competition was revived in 1984 and continued until 1988.

== Winners ==
Year	Winners	2nd place	Venue
1976	Ipswich Witches (John Louis & Billy Sanders)	Coventry Bees (Ole Olsen & Mitch Shirra); Belle Vue Aces (Peter Collins & Chris Morton); Cradley United (John Boulger & Bruce Cribb)	Ipswich
1977	Ipswich Witches (John Louis & Billy Sanders)	King's Lynn Stars (Michael Lee & David Gagen)	Ipswich
1978	Cradley Heath Heathens (Steve Bastable & Bruce Penhall); Coventry Bees (Ole Olsen & Mitch Shirra)	none (shared winners)*	Ipswich
1979 to 1983 competition not held
1984	Belle Vue Aces (Peter Collins & Chris Morton)	Reading Racers (Mitch Shirra & Tim Hunt)	Wolverhampton
1985	Oxford Cheetahs (Hans Nielsen & Simon Wigg)	Reading Racers (Mitch Shirra & John Davis)	Wolverhampton
1986	Oxford Cheetahs (Hans Nielsen & Simon Wigg)	Coventry Bees (Kelvin Tatum & John Jørgensen)	Sheffield
1987	Oxford Cheetahs (Hans Nielsen & Andy Grahame)	Swindon Robins (Mitch Shirra & Jimmy Nilsen)	Reading

- Meeting abandoned after 14 heats due to fog, result stands

== See also ==
- List of United Kingdom Speedway Pairs champions
- Elite League Pairs Championship
