= Malcolm Holloway =

English speedway rider (1956–2012)

- Born: 22 December 1956; Stratton St Margaret, Wiltshire, England
- Died: 3 May 2012 (aged 55)
- Nationality: British (English)

Career history
- 1977–1983, 2003: Swindon Robins
- 1977: Oxford Cheetahs
- 1978, 1979: Milton Keynes Knights
- 1984–1989, 2000, 2004: Reading Racers
- 1989: Mildenhall Fen Tigers
- 2002, 2004: Somerset Rebels
- 2003: Trelawny Tigers

Individual honours
- 1982: British Championship finalist

Malcolm Thomas Holloway (22 December 1956 – 3 May 2012) was an English speedway rider and speedway promoter.

== Speedway career ==
Holloway reached the final of the British Speedway Championship in 1982. He rode in the top tier of British Speedway from 1977–2004, riding for various clubs.

Holloway rode for Reading Racers from 1984 to 1989 and again in 2000 and 2004.

Holloway went on to be the promoter at Reading Racers.
