= Björn Andersson (speedway rider) =

Swedish speedway rider

Bjorn Andersson
- Born: 3 November 1962 (age 64); Alingsås, Sweden
- Nationality: Swedish

Career history

Sweden
- 1979-1985: Kaparna

Great Britain
- 1981–1984: Swindon Robins

Individual honours
- 1983: Swedish Championship bronze medal

Team honours
- 1984: Elitserien Champion
- 1982: Allsvenskan Div 1 (South) Champion
- 1980: Allsvenskan Div 2 (South) Champion

Bjorn Mikael Andersson (born 3 November 1962) is a former motorcycle speedway rider from Sweden. He earned 10 caps for the Sweden national speedway team.

== Career ==
Andersson made his debut in the British leagues in 1981, when he joined the Swindon Robins for the 1981 British League season.

In 1982, Andersson represented Sweden during the 1982 Speedway World Team Cup. The following year in 1983, he made another World Cup appearance at the 1983 Speedway World Team Cup, in addition to winning the bronze medal at the Swedish Individual Speedway Championship.

Andersson's final World Cup appearance was at the 1984 Speedway World Team Cup, the same year that he rode in the 1984 Speedway World Pairs Championship.

Andersson stayed at Swindon for four seasons until his last season in Britain which was 1984. He starred with his brother Jan Andersson and Pierre Brannefors during Kaparna's league championship title win, during the 1984 Swedish speedway season.
