= Grevby Motorstadion =

Stadium in Mariestad, Sweden

- Location: Grevby Motorstadion 1, 542 92 Mariestad, Sweden
- Coordinates: 58°45′38″N 13°58′19″E
- Operator: Örnarna motorcycle speedway
- Length: 295 m (0.183 mi)

Grevby Motorstadion is a motorcycle speedway track located about 10 kilometres north of Mariestad. The facility is in a remote location just off the European route E20.

The stadium hosts the Örnarna speedway team that competes in the Swedish Speedway Team Championship. They have been champions of Sweden four times.

== History ==
The name Grevby Motorstadion derives from the farm Grevby, near Hasslerör in the Mariestad municipality.

The stadium hosted the Intercontinental final round of the 1984 Speedway World Team Cup and the fourth round of the 1990 Speedway World Team Cup. It also hosted the final of the Swedish Individual Speedway Championship in 1983 and 1992.

The name of the Arena was changed to the Husky Arena on 8 May 2004 after Mariestads Motorklubb secured a new main sponsor, the Electrical Apparatus & Equipment company Canvac Hova AB. Husky was a product range and then it was subsequently called the Canvac Arena.

In 2019, another name change ensued to the EHCC (Fastigheter) Arena, following a three-year agreement with the real estate company. As of May 2025, the venue was renamed to the Gruskungen Speedway Arena.

== Stadium name changes ==
- Husky Arena (2004)
- Canvac Arena
- EHCC Arena (2019)
