= Carl Blackbird =

English speedway rider

- Born: 26 March 1965 (age 61); Peterborough, England
- Nationality: British (English)

Career history
- 1981–1985: Mildenhall Fen Tigers
- 1984, 1988: Ipswich Witches
- 1985–1987: Belle Vue Aces
- 1989: Reading Racers
- 1990: Edinburgh Monarchs
- 1991–1993: Long Eaton Invaders

Individual honours
- 1986: British Championship finalist
- 1985: British Under 21 Champion

Team honours
- 1984: British League Champion
- 1984: British League Knockout Cup Winner
- 1984: NL Fours Championship

Carl Ivan Blackbird (born 26 March 1965) is a former motorcycle speedway rider from England and Great Britain.

== Speedway career ==
Blackbird rode in the top tier of British Speedway from 1981–1993, riding for various clubs.

In 1984, Blackbird won the league and cup double with Ipswich Witches during the 1984 British League season, in addition to helping Mildenhall Fen Tigers win the Fours Championship during the 1984 National League season.

In 1985, Blackbird became the British Under 21 Champion and signed for Belle Vue Aces for a £20,000 transfer fee from Mildenhall Fen Tigers, spending three years at the Manchester club. He reached the final of the British Speedway Championship in 1986. In 1988, he signed for Ipswich Witches, moving from Belle Vue.

At retirement, Blackbird had earned eight international caps for the England national speedway team.

== Family ==
Blackbird's son Lewis is a former speedway rider, as were Carl's brothers Mark and Paul.
