= Andy Campbell (speedway rider) =

English speedway rider

- Born: 3 October 1959 (age 67); Guildford, England
- Nationality: British (English)

Career history
- 1979, 1980: Glasgow Tigers
- 1981–1982, 1984: Exeter Falcons
- 1981–1983: Poole Pirates
- 1985: Belle Vue Aces
- 1986, 1987: King's Lynn Stars
- 1988: Wimbledon Dons
- 1989, 1990: Berwick Bandits

Individual honours
- 1985: British Championship finalist

Andy Campbell (born 3 October 1959) is a former speedway rider from England.

== Speedway career ==
Campbell rode in the top tier of British Speedway, starting in 1979 and riding for various clubs until 1990.

Campbell finished second in the Exeter Falcons team averages during the 1984 British League season, which led him to repesting the club in the 1984 British League Riders' Championship, held at Hyde Road on 20 October.

Campbell reached the final of the British Speedway Championship in 1985.

Campbell also came in first place for three years in a row (1989-1991) for the British Championship, Ice Speedway at Telford.
