= Pierre Brannefors =

Swedish speedway rider (1962–2019)

- Born: 30 December 1962; Gothenburg, Sweden
- Died: 21 August 2019 (aged 56)
- Nationality: Swedish

Career history

Sweden
- 1980-1985: Kaparna
- 1986-1987: Indianerna

Great Britain
- 1981: King's Lynn Stars
- 1983, 1984: Reading Racers

Individual honours
- 1980: Swedish U21 champion

Team honours
- 1983: World Pairs finalist
- 1984: Elitserien Champion
- 1980: Allsvenskan Div 2 (South) Champion
- 1982: Allsvenskan Div 1 (South) Champion

Pierre Bertil Brannefors (1962-2019) was a Swedish international speedway rider. He earned 14 international caps for the Sweden national speedway team.

== Speedway career ==
Brannefors reached the final of the Speedway World Pairs Championship in the 1983 Speedway World Pairs Championship.

Brannefors rode in the top tier of British Speedway from 1981 with the King's Lynn Stars to 1984, riding for Reading Racers. He was also the 1980 Swedish Junior Champion.

Brannefors starred with the brothers Björn Andersson and Jan Andersson, during Kaparna's league championship title win, during the 1984 Swedish speedway season.

== World Final appearances ==
=== World Pairs Championship ===
- 1983 - (Sweden) Gothenburg, Ullevi (with Jan Andersson) - 5th - 16pts (4)

=== World Team Cup ===
- 1985 – USA Long Beach, Veterans Memorial Stadium (with Jan Andersson / Jimmy Nilsen / Per Jonsson / Tommy Nilsson - 4th - 10pts (0)

== Family ==
Brannefors' father Bengt was also a professional speedway rider.
