= Speedway Žarnovica =

Stadium in Žarnovica, Slovakia

- Location: Bystrická 37, 966 81 Žarnovica, Slovakia
- Coordinates: 48°28′52″N 18°43′23″E
- Opened: 1953

Speedway Žarnovica is a motorcycle speedway stadium and team in the centre of Žarnovica. The stadium is located off the Bystrická, just south of the tributary, which runs though the centre of the town connected to the Hron. The speedway is organised by the Speedway Club Žarnovica.

== History ==
The stadium opened in 1953 and even when the country was part of Czechoslovakia, it hosted important motorcycle speedway events, including multiple qualifying rounds of the Speedway World Championship, starting in 1979 and a qualifying round of the Speedway World Team Cup in 1986.

The first motorcycle sport World Championship event as an independent nation was held at the track in 1994.

The stadium continues to hold major international speedway events which have included rounds of the Individual Speedway European Championship, finals of the European Under-19 Individual Speedway Championship and the Speedway Grand Prix Qualification series.

In 2019, the stadium's team called Speedway Club Interteam Žarnovica (due to sponsorship purposes) won the bronze medal in the Czech Republic Team Speedway Championship (there is no Slovakian league).
