= Speedway Star =

British speedway magazine

- Editor: Andrew Skeels
- Categories: Sports
- Frequency: Weekly
- Publisher: Pinegen Limited
- Founder: Eric Linden
- Founded: March 1952
- Country: United Kingdom
- Language: English
- Website: www.speedwaystar.net

Speedway Star is a national motorcycle speedway magazine. The magazine is published every week of the year and the emphasis of the publication is on British speedway but also features international speedway from around the world. The magazine is owned and published by Pinegen Limited of Surbiton.

== History ==
The magazine was founded by Eric Linden during the spring of 1952.

Chesham Press (an amalgamation of Carlton Press and Page and Thomas) were based in Germain Street, Chesham and printed the magazine for several decades.

Editors in chronological order have been Eric Linden (founder), John Hyam, Paul Parish, Phil Rising, Richard Clark and Andrew Skeels.

The magazine has been the principal sponsor for the British Knockout Cup.
