= Jan Andersson (speedway rider) =

Swedish speedway rider

- Born: 7 May 1955 (age 71); Alingsås, Sweden
- Nationality: Swedish

Career history

Sweden
- 1974–1985, 1992–1994: Kaparna
- 1986–1990: Vetlanda

Great Britain
- 1975–1978: Swindon Robins
- 1979–1988, 1990–1992: Reading Racers

Individual honours
- 1978, 1980, 1981, 1982, 1984, 1985: World finalist
- 1979, 1980, 1981, 1984: Swedish Champion
- 1979: Nordic Champion
- 1974: Swedish U21 champion
- 1985: Pride of the East
- 1979: Geoff Curtis Memorial
- 1980, 1981, 1982, 1983, 1984, 1985, 1987, 1988: Indoor British Open Champion
- 1981: Littlechild Trophy

Team honours
- 1980, 1990, 1992: British League Champion
- 1990: British League KO Cup Winner
- 1984, 1986, 1987: Elitserien Champion
- 1980: Allsvenskan Div 2 (South) Champion
- 1982: Allsvenskan Div 1 (South) Champion

Jan Hakan Andersson (born 7 May 1955) is a Swedish former speedway rider. He earned 39 caps for the Sweden national speedway team.

== Speedway career ==
Andersson was a leading speedway rider during the 1980s reaching six Speedway World Championship finals in 1978, 1980, 1981, 1982, 1984 and 1985. He was the Swedish champion on four occasions (1979, 1980, 1981 and 1984) and Nordic Champion in 1979.

Andersson rode in the top tier of British Speedway riding for the Swindon Robins from 1975 until 1978. He left Swindon to join Reading because his international commitments would have meant missing some of Swindon's Saturday night fixtures.

Andersson rode for Reading Racers from 1979 until 1992 and is regarded as a club legend. Andersson also starred with his brother Björn Andersson and Pierre Brannefors, during Kaparna's league championship title win, during the 1984 Swedish speedway season.

== World final appearances ==
=== Individual World Championship ===
- 1978 – (England) London, Wembley Stadium - 14th - 3pts
- 1980 – (Sweden) Gothenburg, Ullevi - 4th - 11pts
- 1981 – (England) London, Wembley Stadium - 6th - 9pts
- 1982 – (United States) Los Angeles, Memorial Coliseum - 8th - 8pts
- 1984 – (Sweden) Gothenburg, Ullevi - 10th - 6pts
- 1985 – (England) Bradford, Odsal Stadium - 10th - 7pts

=== World Team Cup ===
- 1985 – USA Long Beach, Veterans Memorial Stadium (with Jimmy Nilsen / Per Jonsson / Tommy Nilsson / Pierre Brannefors) - 4th - 10pts (5)
- 1986 – (Sweden) Gothenburg, Ullevi, (Denmark) Vojens, Speedway Center and (England) Bradford, Odsal Stadium (with Jimmy Nilsen / Per Jonsson / Tommy Nilsson / Erik Stenlund / Tony Olsson) - 4th - 73pts (28)

=== World Pairs Championship ===
- 1978 – (Poland) Chorzów, Silesian Stadium (with Börje Klingberg) - 7th - 11pts (10)
- 1980 – (Socialist Federal Republic of Yugoslavia) Krško, Matija Gubec Stadium (with Richard Hellsen) - 4th - 18pts (9)
- 1983 – (Sweden) Gothenburg, Ullevi (with Pierre Brannefors) - 5th - 16pts (12)
- 1985 – (Poland) Rybnik, Rybnik Municipal Stadium (with Per Jonsson) - 5th - 14pts (10)
- 1986 – (West Germany) Pocking, Rottalstadion (with Tommy Nilsson) - 4th - 32pts (17)
