= Kevin Hawkins =

British speedway rider

- Born: 21 July 1954 (age 72); Buckingham, England
- Nationality: British (English)

Career history
- 1976–1978, 1985–1988: Peterborough Panthers
- 1979: Nottingham Outlaws
- 1979–1985: Coventry Bees

Team honours
- 1979: British League Champion
- 1977, 1988: National League Four-Team Championship winner
- 1981, 1985: League Cup winner
- 1979, 1981, 1982: Midland Cup winner
- 1980: Midland League champion

Kevin Roy Hawkins (born 21 July 1954) is a former motorcycle speedway rider from England.

== Career ==
Hawkins started his British leagues career during the 1976 National League season, where he rode for Peterborough Panthers. The following season, he improved his average and helped Peterborough win the Fours Championship during the 1977 season.

After another season with Peterborough in 1978, Hawkins signed for Nottingham Outlaws and doubled up in the highest division with Coventry Bees in the 1979 British League season. He continued to ride for Coventry for seven years and was with them when Coventry won the 1981 League Cup and 1985 League Cup

After being transfer listed by Coventry, Hawkins returned to Peterborough in 1985 and was their leading rider for two seasons. After finishing runner-up in the 1987 league pairs, he rode for one more season in 1988. His career ended on a high when he helped the Peterborough win another Fours Championship during the 1988 National League season.

After retiring, Hawkins managed the Peterborough team and was in charge when they won the treble in 1992.

== Family ==
His son Ritchie Hawkins is a former professional speedway rider and team manager.
