= John Cook (speedway rider) =

American speedway rider (born 1958)

- Born: 18 December 1958 (age 67); Van Nuys, California
- Nationality: American

Career history

Great Britain
- 1980: Hull Vikings
- 1981–1982, 1984–1986: Ipswich Witches
- 1987, 2000: King's Lynn Stars
- 1993: Poole Pirates

Sweden
- 1992–1993: Indianerna
- 1995: Getingarna
- 1996–1997, 1999–2001: Smederna
- 2001: Örnarna

Individual honours
- 1992: Swedish Champion

Team honours
- 1985: World Team Cup silver
- 1984, 1987: World Team Cup bronze
- 1981, 1984: British League KO Cup winner
- 1984: British League Champion

John Kenneth Cook (born December 18, 1958, in Van Nuys, California) is an American former international motorcycle speedway rider. He represented the USA in three World Team Cup finals and earned 49 caps for the United States national speedway team.

== Career ==
Cook is mainly remembered for his spell at the Ipswich Witches teams from 1981 to 1982 and from 1984 to 1986 where he walked out on the club mid-season on both occasions.

Cook first rode in Britain for the Hull Vikings, when he competed in the 1980 British League season. His first spell at Ipswich began the following season in 1981 after a record £35,000 deal which included fellow American Dennis Sigalos. The pair helped the Witches win the Knockout Cup. In August 1982 he walked out of match and returned to America.

In 1984, Cook returned to Ipswich and contributed significantly to the team's league and cup double season and won a bronze medal in the 1984 Speedway World Team Cup. His career took off in 1985 as he reached the final of the 1985 Individual Speedway World Championship and won a silver medal at the 1985 Speedway World Team Cup.

After an unsuccessful 1986 season when he walked out on Ipswich again, Cook joined King's Lynn Stars for the 1987 season and participated in his second world final during the 1987 Individual Speedway World Championship. He also won a second bronze medal at the 1987 Speedway World Team Cup in Prague.

Cook was a showman and continued in this vein for the whole of his career, whilst not always riding in the British League, he was a regular rider in the Swedish League with Indianerna where he attained Swedish citizenship in the early 1990s and in fact was the Swedish Champion in 1992, winning all of his rides. He is also attributed with introducing Jet Ski watercraft to Australia, New Zealand and Europe where he became the first European Champion in closed course competition. During a speedway hiatus, he also competed as an American Expert Jet Ski racer and was ranked #4 in the World while racing underpowered craft.

Cook continued to ride well into his 40s and almost qualified for the Speedway Grand Prix Series for 2002, only failing at the 2001 Intercontinental Final stage.

Cook surfaced again on the international Speedway front in 2006 where he was indeed a member of the USA squad for the 2006 Speedway World Cup, however he was not required to ride in the actual competition.

In October 2006, Cook suffered a serious motocross accident while racing at Washougal Washington in which he hurt his back quite badly and had to have metal rods inserted. The rods were later removed as Cook began to make a recovery but he has had to retire from racing and remains retired in his longtime home of Sacramento, California.

== World final appearances ==
=== Individual World Championship ===
- 1985 - (England) Bradford, Odsal Stadium - 7th - 9pts
- 1987 - (Netherlands) Amsterdam, Olympic Stadium - 8th - 15pts

=== World Team Cup ===
- 1984 - (Poland) Leszno, Alfred Smoczyk Stadium (with Shawn Moran / Kelly Moran / Lance King / Bobby Schwartz) – 3rd – 20pts (2)
- 1985 - (United States) Long Beach, Veterans Memorial Stadium (with Shawn Moran / Bobby Schwartz / Lance King / Sam Ermolenko) – 2nd – 35pts (1)
- 1987 - (Czech Republic) Prague, Marketa Stadium (with Shawn Moran / Rick Miller / Kelly Moran) - 3rd - 93pts (6)
