= Tim Hunt (speedway rider) =

English speedway rider

- Born: 23 May 1960 (age 66); Ipswich, England
- Nationality: British (English)

Career history
- 1978: Peterborough Panthers
- 1978–1981: Ipswich Witches
- 1979: Canterbury Crusaders
- 1982–1985: Reading Racers
- 1983: Swindon Robins

Individual honours
- 1985: British Championship finalist

Team honours
- 1978: National League Fours winner
- 1981: British League Knockout Cup winner

Timothy John Hunt (born 23 May 1960) is a former motorcycle speedway from England. He earned one international cap for the England national speedway team.

== Speedway career ==
Hunt rode in the top tier of British Speedway from 1978–1985, riding for various clubs.

During the 1978 National League season, Hunt was part of the Peterborough team that won the Fours championship. The following season in 1979, he signed for Canterbury Crusaders.

After leaving Ipswich Witches in 1981, Hunt joined Reading Racers, where he spent four seasons. Hunt reached the final of the British Speedway Championship in 1985.
