= Preben Eriksen =

Danish speedway rider

- Born: 9 August 1958 (age 68); Odense, Denmark
- Nationality: Danish

Career history

Denmark

Great Britain
- 1977, 1984-1988: Wolverhampton Wolves
- 1979-1983: Ipswich Witches
- 1989: Mildenhall Fen Tigers

Team honours
- 1984, 1985: World Team Cup
- 1981: British League KO Cup winner

Preben Kollster Eriksen (born 9 August 1958) in Odense, Denmark, is a former motorcycle speedway rider from Denmark. He earned 41 caps for the Denmark national speedway team.

== Career ==
Eriksen rode with the Wolverhampton Wolves in 1977 but was recalled by the Danish Federation because he was refused clearance over the fact that he did not have senior status. His return to Wolves was thwarted when Ipswich Witches beat them to his signature for the 1979 British League season. He spent five years at Ipswich, building his average up from 4.45 in 1979 to 8.83 in 1982 and won the Knockout Cup in 1981. He finally joined Wolves for the 1984 British League season and spent five years with the Midlands club.

Eriksen was part of the Danish national team during their period of domination during the 1980s and won the World Team Cup with Denmark in 1984 and 1985, riding alongside some of the world's best riders at the time Hans Nielsen, Erik Gundersen and Tommy Knudsen.

== World Final Appearances ==
=== Individual World Championship ===
- 1981 - (England) London, Wembley Stadium - reserve - did not ride

=== World Team Cup ===
- 1982 - (England) London, White City Stadium (with Ole Olsen / Hans Nielsen / Erik Gundersen / Tommy Knudsen) - 2nd - 27pts (4)
- 1984 - (Poland) Leszno, Alfred Smoczyk Stadium (with Bo Petersen / Erik Gundersen / Hans Nielsen) - Winner - 44pts (9)
- 1985 - (United States) Long Beach, Veterans Memorial Stadium (with Bo Petersen / Tommy Knudsen / Erik Gundersen / Hans Nielsen) - Winner - 37pts (5)

== See also ==
- Denmark national speedway team
