= Paul Woods (speedway rider) =

English speedway rider

- Born: 17 January 1959 (age 67); Canterbury, England
- Nationality: British (English)

Career history
- 1976–1984, 1990, 1992: Eastbourne Eagles
- 1979–1980: Crayford Kestrels
- 1985: King's Lynn Stars
- 1986–1989: Rye House Rockets
- 1986: Ipswich Witches
- 1991: Milton Keynes Knights

Individual honours
- 1982, 1983: British Championship finalist

Team honours
- 1977: National League Champion
- 1977, 1978: National League KO Cup Winner
- 1980: National League Fours Champion

Paul Woods (born 17 January 1959) is a former speedway rider from England. He earned two international caps for the England national speedway team.

== Speedway career ==
Woods rode in the top tier of British Speedway from 1976–1992, riding for various clubs.

In 1980, Woods helped the Crayford Kestrels win the Fours Championship during the 1980 National League season.

Woods reached the final of the British Speedway Championship on two occasions in 1982 and 1983. In 1983, he topped the Eastbourne team averages and represented them in the British League Riders' Championship, held at Hyde Road on 15 October 1983.
