= Reading Racers =

Former British motorcycle speedway team

Club information
- Track address: Reading Stadium (1968–1973); Smallmead Stadium (1975–2008)
- Founded: 1968 (reformed 2016)
- Closed: 2008

Club facts
- Colours: Blue and White
- Track size: 307 metres (336 yd)
- Track record time: 58.1 seconds
- Track record date: 12 October 1987
- Track record holder: Per Jonsson

Major team honours
League champions	1973, 1980, 1990, 1992
KO Cup winners	1990
Fours winners (tier 1)	1993
Premier League (tier 2)	1997
KO Cup (tier 2)	1998
Spring Gold Cup	1972, 1977
SDL champions	2017, 2018

Reading Racers were a British motorcycle speedway team. Formed in 1968, they won four British League titles during their history. The club closed in October 2008 after the lease on Smallmead Stadium was sold and the site was demolished.

== History ==
=== 1960s ===
The club was formed in 1968 and were founder members of British League Division Two. Promoted by Reg Fearman, the team were based at the Reading Stadium (Oxford Road) for their inaugural season and finished 8th out of 10 teams.

The first home fixture was held on 17 June shortly after construction of the new track was completed. The following season in 1969, the Racers signed Mick Bell and Richard May, which transformed the team into a title-challenging one, but they lost out to Belle Vue Colts.

=== 1970s ===
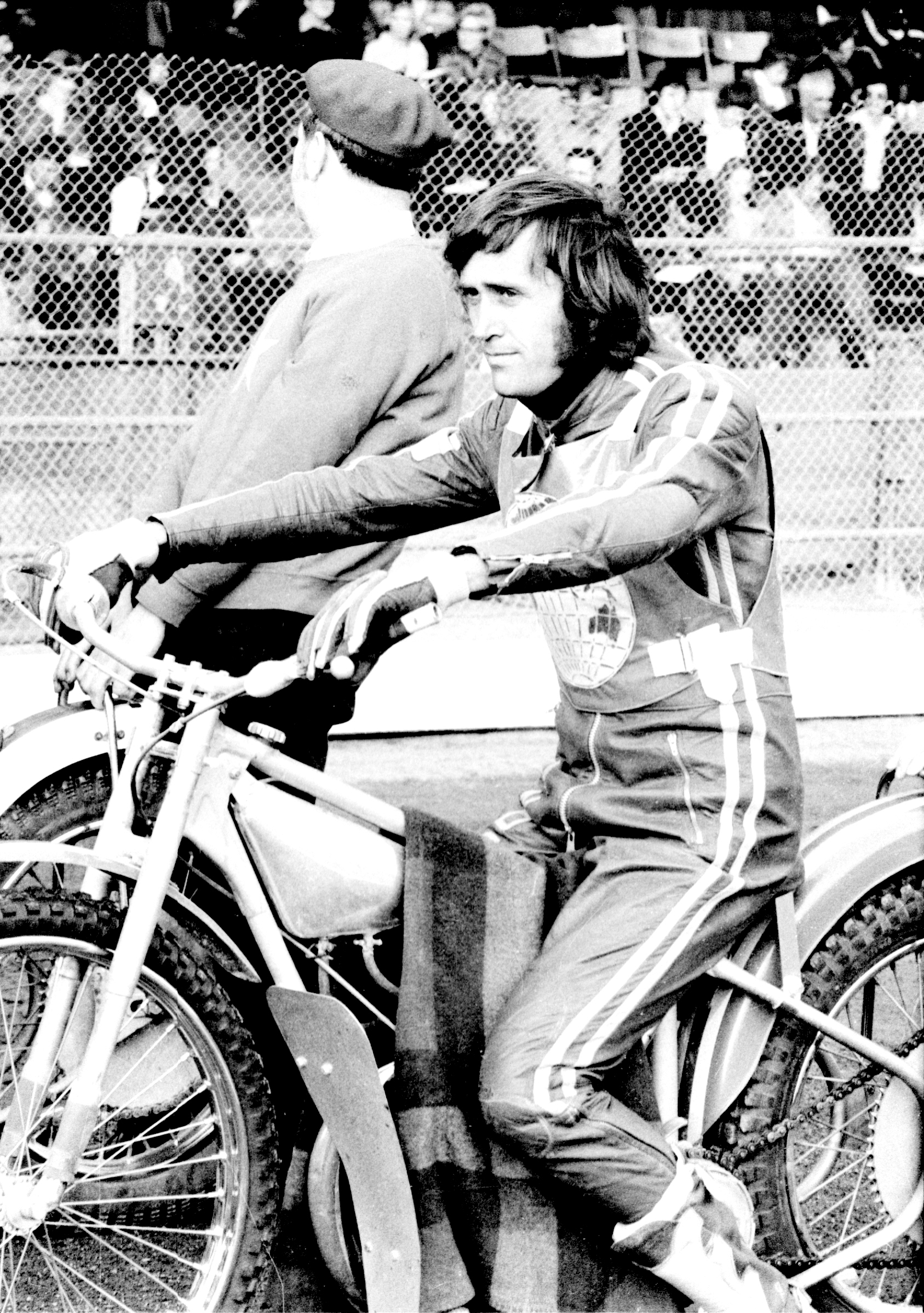
Anders Michanek

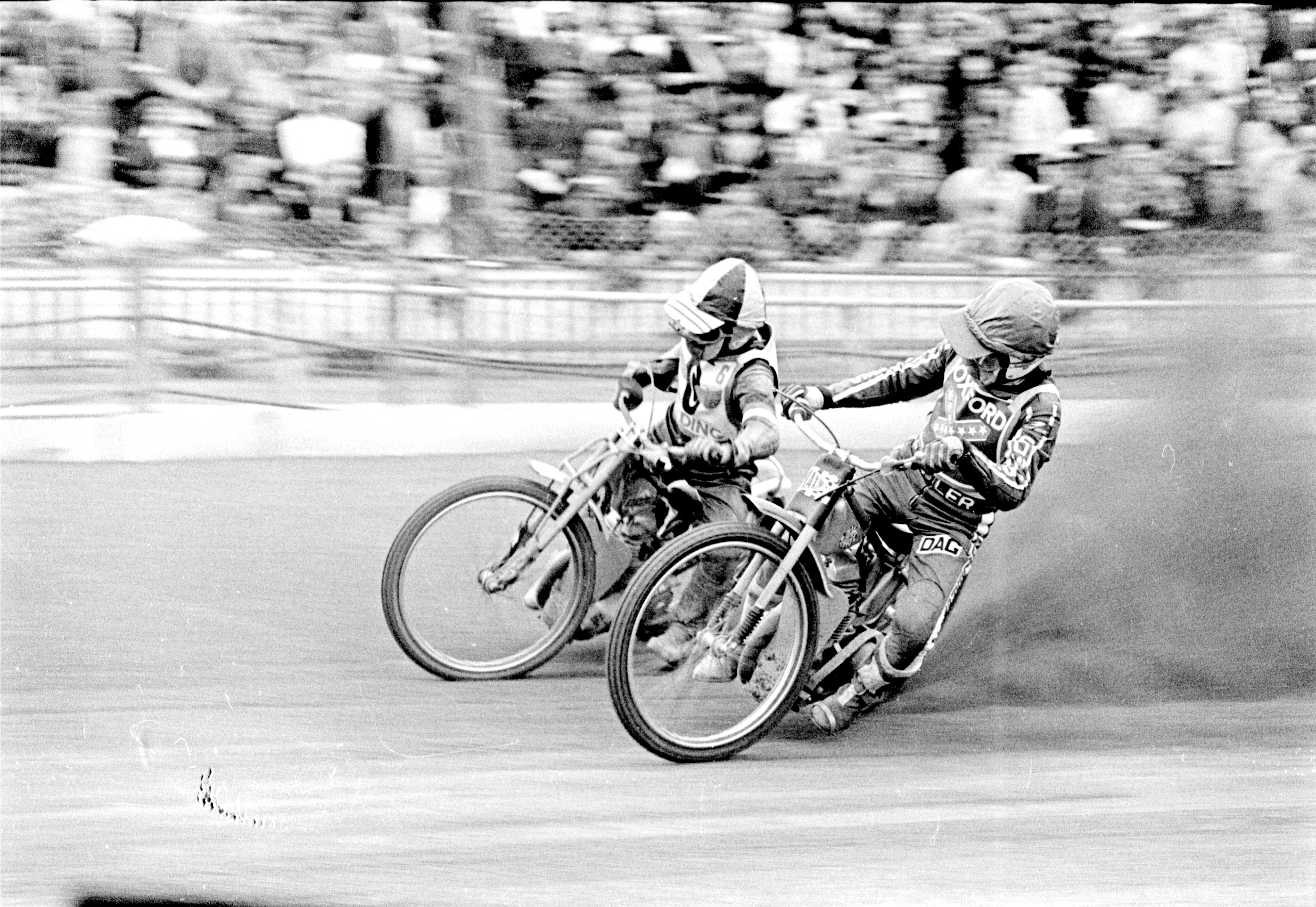
Dag Lovaas

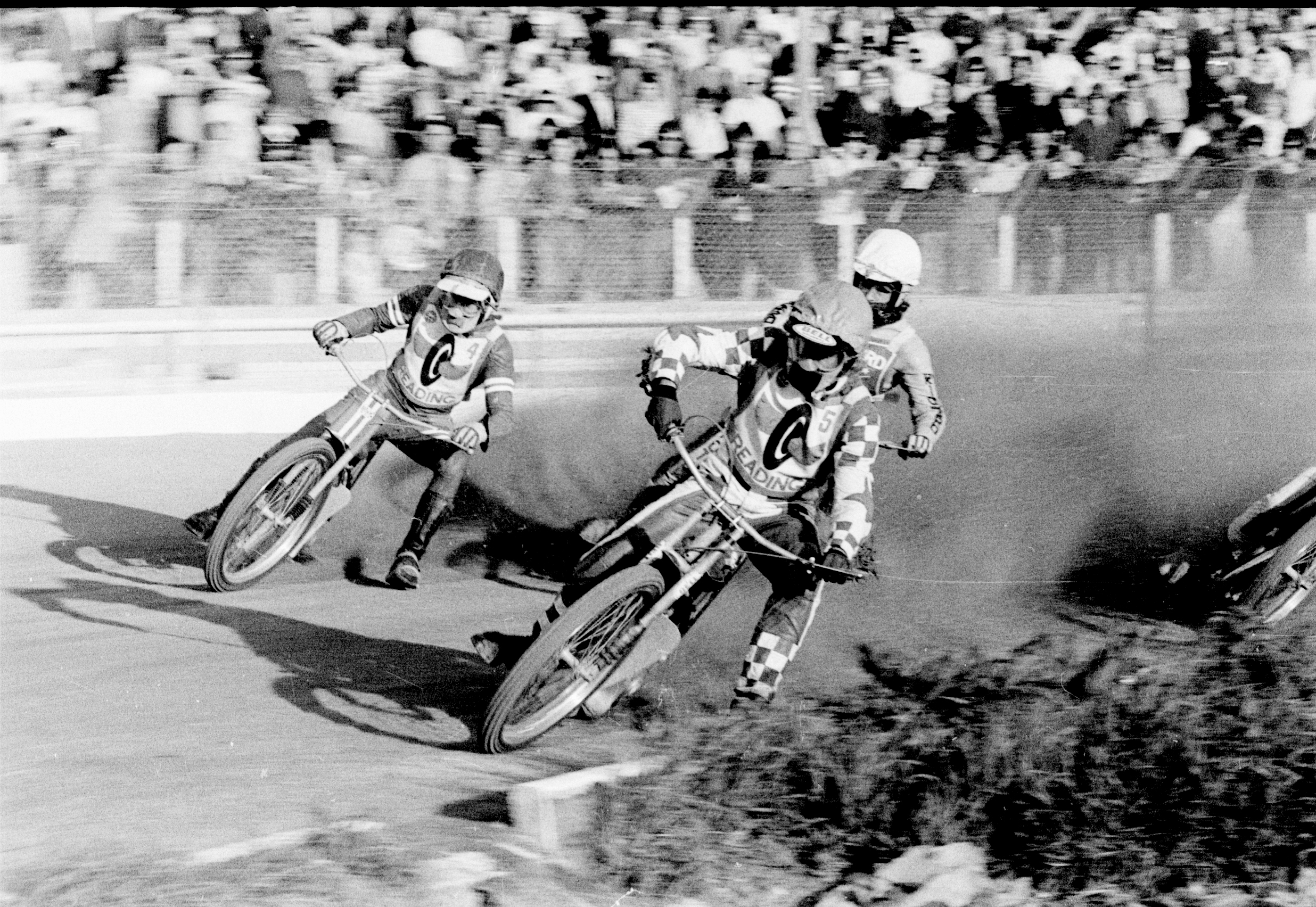
Reading Racers at the Smallmead Stadium in 1975

After a quiet 1970, the decision was made to switch league licences with Newcastle Diamonds, which saw the Racers compete in division 1 for the first time. The team signed one of the world's leading riders in Swede Anders Michanek and he was to be backed by Norwegian Dag Lövaas and Australians Geoff Curtis and Geoff Mudge. In 1972, the Racers were denied the league title again by the Manchester club, this time the Belle Vue Aces.

Despite a successful season, news broke that the stadium was to be sold for re-development, which sparked protests. In what would be their final year at the stadium, the Racers won their first British League title. Anders Michanek was in imperious form, going undefeated in home fixtures and finishing with an 11.36 average. In addition to Michanek, the team was boosted by high scoring from Dag Lövaas and Geoff Curtis and supported by Peter Murray, Richard May, Mick Bell and Bernie Leigh. In a sensational finish to the 1973 Knockout Cup final, Reading were beaten by Belle Vue in a run-off for the Cup after an aggregate draw over two legs. The end of the year resulted in two items of bad news: the new Smallmead Stadium would not be ready for the 1974 season and Geoff Curtis was killed in race in Australia.

The new stadium known as Smallmead was constructed during 1974, near the site of a refuse tip close to Junction 11 of the M4 motorway. The Racers returned for the 1975 season: a crowd of 9,264 witnessed the opening meeting against Hull and Reading won the match by 18 points. The club finished 6th that campaign and had an average crowd of almost 6,500 per meeting. Between 1976 and 1979 the crowd figures remained high, despite a poor 1978 when the club finished 14th out of 19 teams. The best finish was third place in 1977, when the team was led by Dave Jessup and John Davis.

=== 1980s ===
The club enjoyed a successful 1980 season under new promoter Dave Lanning and team manager Mick Bell. The Racers won the British League title for a second time and attracted crowds of over 7,000 on a regular basis. Reading's success came down to three strong heat leaders: Swedish champion Jan Andersson, their new American signing Bobby Schwartz and England international John Davis. All three produced season averages around the 10 mark, which enabled the team to constantly pick up victories. However, behind the scenes unrest in the management structure saw major changes at the end of the season with Directors Bill Dore and Frank Higley taking control of the club.

The club suffered the tragedy of losing their 25-year old American rider Denny Pyeatt, who suffered fatal head injuries during an away match at Hackney Hawks in July 1982. Despite tracking very competitive-looking teams in the mid-1980s, the club never achieved the dizzy heights of the start of the decade. They twice finished 4th (1983 and 1984) and were 5th in 1988, with the team's leading rider of the period being Jan Andersson, who was supported well by Mitch Shirra and Per Jonsson.

=== 1990s ===
In 1990, the team manager was Tim Sugar and the co-promoter was Pat Bliss. The team retained Jeremy Doncaster (signed in 1989) and brought in Australian signing Todd Wiltshire, to support Jan Andersson and Per Jonsson. The team became champions of Britain for the third time and achieved the double after defeating Bradford Dukes in the KO Cup final. Additionally, Per Jonsson was crowned world speedway champion in 1990.

The club won another league title in 1992, with Jonsson averaging 10.04, Doncaster and Andersson still scoring strong and great support from Dave Mullett and Armando Castagna. The Racers won the fours in 1993 but disaster struck in 1994, when Per Jonsson suffered terrible injuries in a crash in Poland, and this had an adverse effect on the club and its fortunes. 1995 and 1996 were poor seasons for the club, as crowds dropped and media interest waned.

The 1997 season saw the club drop down to the second-tier Premier League for the first time since 1970. The decision not to join the Elite League brought immediate success for the club, as they were crowned champions that year, with Dave Mullett proving to be the best rider in the league. The following year in 1998 the team won the Knockout Cup, inspired by Lee Richardson.

=== 2000s ===
The period up to 2004 were lean years for the club, which had seen veteran promoter Chris Shears and his son Ivan become part of the promotional and management set-up. In 2004, the club showed signs of resurgence with a sponsorship deal with local telecomms company Euphony Communications. This funded the signature of rider Danny Bird and Slovenian Matej Žagar. Bird and Phil Morris (who replaced an injured Žagar) won the Premier League Pairs Championship in June of that season.

After a disappointing 2005 season, the promotion sold the club to BSI Speedway in 2006. The new promotion took Reading into the Elite League and changed the club name to the Reading Bulldogs. Their first season was a huge success on track: led by American rider Greg Hancock, the Bulldogs narrowly missed out on the title, losing by a single point to Peterborough Panthers in the play-off final. However, crowds were poor and the club struggled to break even, with blame being directed at the lack of investment in the Smallmead Stadium and the change of nickname from Racers to Bulldogs. The majority of the successful 2006 team were retained for the 2007 season, but crowds dropped again, which resulted in BSI putting the club up for sale mid-season. Swindon-based businessman Mark Legg took over and appointed ex-rider Malcolm Holloway as his co-promoter and Tim Sugar returned as team manager. The club also reverted to their original Racers name.

In 2008, the club opted to drop back down to the Premier League, but the season was a traumatic time on and off track for the club. The season was overshadowed by the news that the Smallmead Stadium lease expired in October 2008 and would not be renewed. A final farewell meeting was held on 19 October 2008 and witnessed by a near capacity crowd of 3,200.

=== 2016 to present ===
In 2016, a group of supporters got together to bring back the team and in September 2016, the Reading Racers rode in a challenge match against Weymouth Wildcats. In 2017, the team entered the Southern Development League (SDL). The 2017 season was Reading's first back in a League since 2008, although they rode at an adopted home in Eastbourne. The team won the inaugural SDL and continued to race in 2018 and 2019 (the latter racing at Swindon). In 2020, due to a combination of the COVID-19 pandemic and rule changes by the BSPA, the team were once again without a home and the team plans were put on hold.

== Season summary ==
Extended content

Year and league	Position	Notes
1968 British League Division Two season	8th	
1969 British League Division Two season	2nd	
1970 British League Division Two season	9th	
1971 British League season	6th	
1972 British League season	2nd	
1973 British League season	1st	Champions
1975 British League season	6th	
1976 British League season	6th	
1977 British League season	3rd	
1978 British League season	14th	
1979 British League season	7th	
1980 British League season	1st	Champions
1981 British League season	11th	
1982 British League season	9th	
1983 British League season	4th	
1984 British League season	4th	
1985 British League season	9th	
1986 British League season	7th	
1987 British League season	7th	
1988 British League season	5th	
1989 British League season	7th	
1990 British League season	1st	Champions & Knockout Cup winners
1991 British League season	11th	
1992 British League season	1st	Champions
1993 British League season	6th	Fours winners
1994 British League season	10th	
1995 Premier League speedway season	13th	
1996 Premier League speedway season	19th	
1997 Premier League speedway season	1st	Champions
1998 Premier League speedway season	2nd	Knockout Cup winner
1999 Premier League speedway season	13th	
2000 Premier League speedway season	14th	
2001 Premier League speedway season	9th	
2002 Premier League speedway season	8th	
2003 Premier League speedway season	16th	
2004 Premier League speedway season	3rd	Pairs Champions
2005 Premier League speedway season	10th	
2006 Elite League speedway season	2nd	rode as the Bulldogs, PO final
2007 Elite League speedway season	8th	
2008 Premier League speedway season	9th	

== Season summary (juniors) ==
Extended content

Year and league	Position	Notes
1996 Speedway Conference League	11th	Ravens
1997 Speedway Conference League	7th	Raven Sprockets (with Swindon)

== Notable riders ==
- (Sweden) Jan Andersson
- (England) Mick Bell
- (Italy) Armando Castagna
- (Australia) Geoff Curtis
- (England) John Davis
- (England) Jeremy Doncaster
- (United States) Greg Hancock
- (Sweden) Bengt Jansson
- (England) Dave Jessup
- (Sweden) Per Jonsson
- (Norway) Dag Lövaas
- (England) Richard May
- (Sweden) Anders Michanek
- (England) Dave Mullett
- (Sweden) Tony Olsson
- (England) Lee Richardson
- (United States) Bobby Schwartz
- (New Zealand) Mitch Shirra
- (Australia) Todd Wiltshire
