= 1974 Danish speedway season =

Season of speedway in Denmark

The 1974 Danish speedway season was the 1974 season of motorcycle speedway in Denmark.

== Individual ==
=== Danish Final (world championship round) ===
Four riders from the Danish final would progress to the Nordic Final as part of the 1974 Individual Speedway World Championship. The final was held on 27 April at Selskov Speedway in Hillerød, and was won by Nis Nielsen. Only four riders qualified for the Nordic final because Ole Olsen was already seeded through to the Nordic final.

Final

Pos.	Rider	Points	Total
1	Nis Nielsen	3,3,3,2,3	14
2	Preben Rosenkide	3,2,2,3,3	13
3	Bent Nörregaard Jensen	0,3,3,3,3	12
4	Kaj Kristensen	2,2,2,2,3	11
5	Jan Rene Henningsen	2,1,3,3,2	11
6	Leif Berlin Rasmussen	3,3,1,3,0	10
7	Mikael Lohmann	3,1,2,2,2	10
8	Jörgen Walter Johansen	1,0,2,2,2	7
9	Peter Hansen	2,2,1,1,1	7
10	Jörn Morgensen	0,3,1,0,1	5
11	Kurt Bögh	0,0,3,1,1	5
12	Kristian Praestbro	1,0,1,0,2	4
13	John Olsen	2,0,0,1,0	3
14	Godtfred Andreasen	2,0,0,1,0	3
15	Ernst Bögh	0,1,0,1,0	2
16	Gunnar Svendsen	1,0,-,-,-	1

=== Individual Championship ===
The 1974 Danish Individual Speedway Championship was the 1974 edition of the Danish Individual Speedway Championship. The final was held at Fredericia on 15 September. The title was won by Bent Nørregaard-Jensen.

Final

Pos.	Rider	Total
1	Bent Nørregaard-Jensen	13
2	Finn Thomsen	12
3	Kurt Bøgh	11
4	Nis Nielsen	10
5	Jan Rene Henningsen	9
6	Godtfred Andreasen	9
7	Leif Berlin Rasmussen	9
8	Kristian Præstbro	9
9	Ole Hermansen	8
10	Jens Erik Krause Kjaer	6

Key - Each heat has four riders, 3 points for a heat win, 2 for 2nd, 1 for third and 0 for last

=== Junior Championship ===
Mike Lohmann won the Junior Championship.

== Team ==
=== Danish Tournament ===
The 1974 Danish Tournament was won by Faestningsdrengene Fredericia, who became Danish champions for the second time.

Division 1 league table

Pos	Team	P	Pts
1	Faestningsdrengene Fredericia	8	22
2	Vikingerne Esbjerg	8	15
3	Skansedrengene Fredericia	8	9
4	Piraterne Århus	8	8
5	Løverne Haderslev	8	6

Division 2 Group 1

Pos	Team	P	Pts
1	Kulsvierne Hillerød	8	19
2	Jokerne Esbjerg	8	15
3	Hvepsene Haderslev	8	14
4	Svanerne Randers	8	4
5	Brodrenene Fredericia	8	2

Division 2 Group 2

Pos	Team	P	Pts
1	Fynborne Odin Odense	8	15
2	Volddrengene Fredericia	8	14
3	Drabanterne Hillerød	8	13
4	Uldjyderne Herning	8	11
5	Laksene Randers	8	1

Division 2 Group 3

Pos	Team	P	Pts
1	Klitrengene Esbjerg	8	21
2	Falkene Silkeborg	8	17
3	Ulvene Midtsjaellands	8	11
4	Girafdrengene Odense	8	5
5	Pythonerne Århus	8	0

Division 2 Group 4

Pos	Team	P	Pts
1	Esserne Esbjerg	8	21
2	Ørnene Silkeborg	8	15
3	Cimbrerne Aalborg	8	13
4	Hanerne Hanherred	8	11
5	Rodspaetterne Frederikshavn	8	0
