= 1983 Danish speedway season =

Season of speedway in Denmark

The 1983 Danish speedway season was the 1983 season of motorcycle speedway in Denmark.

== Individual ==
=== Danish Final (world championship round) ===
Six riders from the Danish final would progress to the Nordic Final as part of the 1983 Individual Speedway World Championship. The final was held on 9 May at Fjelsted, and was won by Hans Nielsen.

Final

Pos.	Rider	Total
1	Hans Nielsen	15
2	Erik Gundersen	13
3	Ole Olsen	12+3
4	Tommy Knudsen	12+2
5	Peter Ravn	11
6	Finn Rune Jensen	8
7	Preben Eriksen	8
8	Hans Ove Cristinsen	7
9	Kent Noer	7
10	Jens Rasmussen	6
11	Finn Thomsen	6
12	Flemming Pedersen	6
13	Alf Busk	6
14	Hans Albert Klinge	2
15	Bent Juul Larsen	1
16	Kjeld Hansen	0
17	Klaus Lohmann (res)	0

=== Individual Championship ===
The 1983 Danish Individual Speedway Championship was the 1983 edition of the Danish Individual Speedway Championship. The final was held at Selskov on 21 August. The title was won by Erik Gundersen.

Final

Pos.	Rider	Total
1	Erik Gundersen	15
2	Hans Nielsen	14
3	Jens Rasmussen	12
4	Peter Ravn	11
5	Steen Mastrup	9
6	Kurt Hansen	9
7	Bo Petersen	9
8	Preben Eriksen	7
9	Finn Thomsen	7
10	John Eskildsen	6
11	Finn Rune Jensen	6
12	Brian Jacobsen	5
13	Erik Holm	4
14	Flemming Pedersen	3
15	Bent Larsen	3
16	Rene Christiansen	1

Key - Each heat has four riders, 3 points for a heat win, 2 for 2nd, 1 for third and 0 for last

=== Junior Championship ===
Aksel Jepsen won the Junior Championship.

== Team ==
=== Danish Tournament ===
The 1983 Danish Tournament won by Kulsvierne Frederiksborg (the Charcoalers), who became Danish champions for the first time in their history.

Division 1 league table

Pos	Team	P	Pts
1	Kulsvierne Frederiksborg	10	26
2	Leoparderne Fjelsted	10	25
3	Vikingerne Esbjerg	10	24
4	Blabjergdrengene Outrup	10	23
5	Tigers Holsted	10	22
6	Hanerne Hanherred	10	20
7	Rodspaetterne Frederikshavn	10	20
8	Cometerne Fjelsted	10	17
9	Gepards Vojens	10	15
10	Faestningsdrengene	10	14
11	Skansedrengene Fredericia	10	7
12	Cimbrerne Aalborg	10	7
13	Klitrengene Esbjerg	10	6
14	Uldjyderne Herning	10	6
15	Ulvene Midtsjaellands	10	5
16	Panthers Holsted	10	3

Division 2 league table

Pos	Team	P	Pts
1	Falkene Silkeborg	10	30
2	Drabanterne Frederiksborg	10	26
3	Laksene Randers	10	24
4	Hajerne Frederikshavn	10	22
5	Stjernerne Fjelsted	10	22
6	Raketterne Fjelsted	10	20
7	Vestjyderne Outrup	10	17
8	Fighters Vojens	10	13
9	Volddrengene Fredericia	10	13
10	Skovtroldene Frederiksborg	10	13
11	Urhanerne Herning	10	12
12	Pythonerne Århus	10	10
13	Svanerne Munkebo	10	7
14	Magerne Bogense	10	6

Division 3 league table

Pos	Team	P	Pts
1	Jokerne Esbjerg	8	23
2	Fladbrodrdrengene Randers	8	21
3	Jetterne Amager	8	14
4	Satelitterne Fjelsted	8	12
5	Fynborne Odin Odense	8	9
6	Badderne Outrup	8	7
7	Lyngdrengene Herning	8	7
