= 1973 Danish speedway season =

Season of speedway in Denmark

The 1973 Danish speedway season was the 1973 season of motorcycle speedway in Denmark.

== Individual ==
=== Danish Final (world championship round) ===
Eight riders (Arne Andreasen, Erik Tillgaard, Jörn Mogensen, Jens Erik Krause Kjaer, Preben Bollerup, Kurt Bögh, Bent Nørregaard-Jensen and Ole Olsen) competed in the three Nordic qualification rounds, as part of the 1973 Individual Speedway World Championship.

Only one of the Nordic qualifiers (which consisted of all Nordic nations' riders) was held in Denmark on 27 May at Selskov Speedway in Hillerød. It was won by Ole Olsen.

=== Individual Championship ===
The 1973 Danish Individual Speedway Championship was the 1973 edition of the Danish Individual Speedway Championship. The final was held at Selskov Speedway in Hillerød on 30 September. The title was won by Ole Olsen for the 7th time.

Final

Pos.	Rider	Club	Total
1	Ole Olsen	Vojens	15
2	Kurt Bøgh	Fredericia	13
3	Godtfred Andreasen	Fredericia	12
4	Bent Nørregaard-Jensen	Esbjerg	11
5	Jörn Morgensen	Silkeborg	9
6	Jens Erik Krause Kjaer	Arhus	8
7	Nis Nielsen	Esbjerg	8
8	Uffe Sorensen	Slangerup	8
9	Jan Rene Henningsen	Esbjerg	7
10	Leif Berlin Rasmussen	Odenese	7
11	Erling Rasmussen	Fredericia	6
12	Kurt S. Hansen (res)	Esbjerg	5
13	Arne Andreasen	Fredericia	4
14	Preben Rosenkilde	Fredericia	2
15	Karls E. Korneliussen (res)	Aalborg	1
16	Niels Schelde	Esbjerg	0
17	Erik Tillgard	Vojens	0

Key - Each heat has four riders, 3 points for a heat win, 2 for 2nd, 1 for third and 0 for last

=== Junior Championship ===
Finn Thomsen won the Junior Championship.

== Team ==
=== Danish Tournament ===
The 1973 Danish Tournament was won by Piraterne Århus, who became Danish champions for the first time.

Division 1 league table

Pos	Team	P	Pts
1	Piraterne Århus	8	24
2	Vikingerne Esbjerg	8	12
3	Faestningsdrengene Fredericia	8	11
4	Skansedrengene Fredericia	8	9
5	Klitrengene Esbjerg	8	4

Division 2 Group 1

Pos	Team	P	Pts
1	Ørnene Silkeborg	8	23
2	Drabanterne Hillerød	8	14
3	Cimbrerne Aalborg	8	12
4	Hvepsene Haderslev	8	8
5	Laksene Randers	8	3

Division 2 Group 2

Pos	Team	P	Pts
1	Løverne Haderslev	8	22
2	Jokerne Esbjerg	8	13
3	Falkene Silkeborg	8	9
4	Pythonerne Århus	8	4

Division 2 Group 3

Pos	Team	P	Pts
1	Fynborne Odin Odense	8	22
2	Kulsvierne Hillerød	8	18
3	Volddrengene Fredericia	8	13
4	Svanerne Randers	8	5
5	Uldjyderne Herning	8	2

Division 2 Group 4

Pos	Team	P	Pts
1	Ulvene Midtsjaellands	8	20
2	Esserne Esbjerg	8	12
3	Girafdrengene Odense	8	9
4	Brodrenene Fredericia	8	7
