= 1981 Danish speedway season =

Season of speedway in Denmark

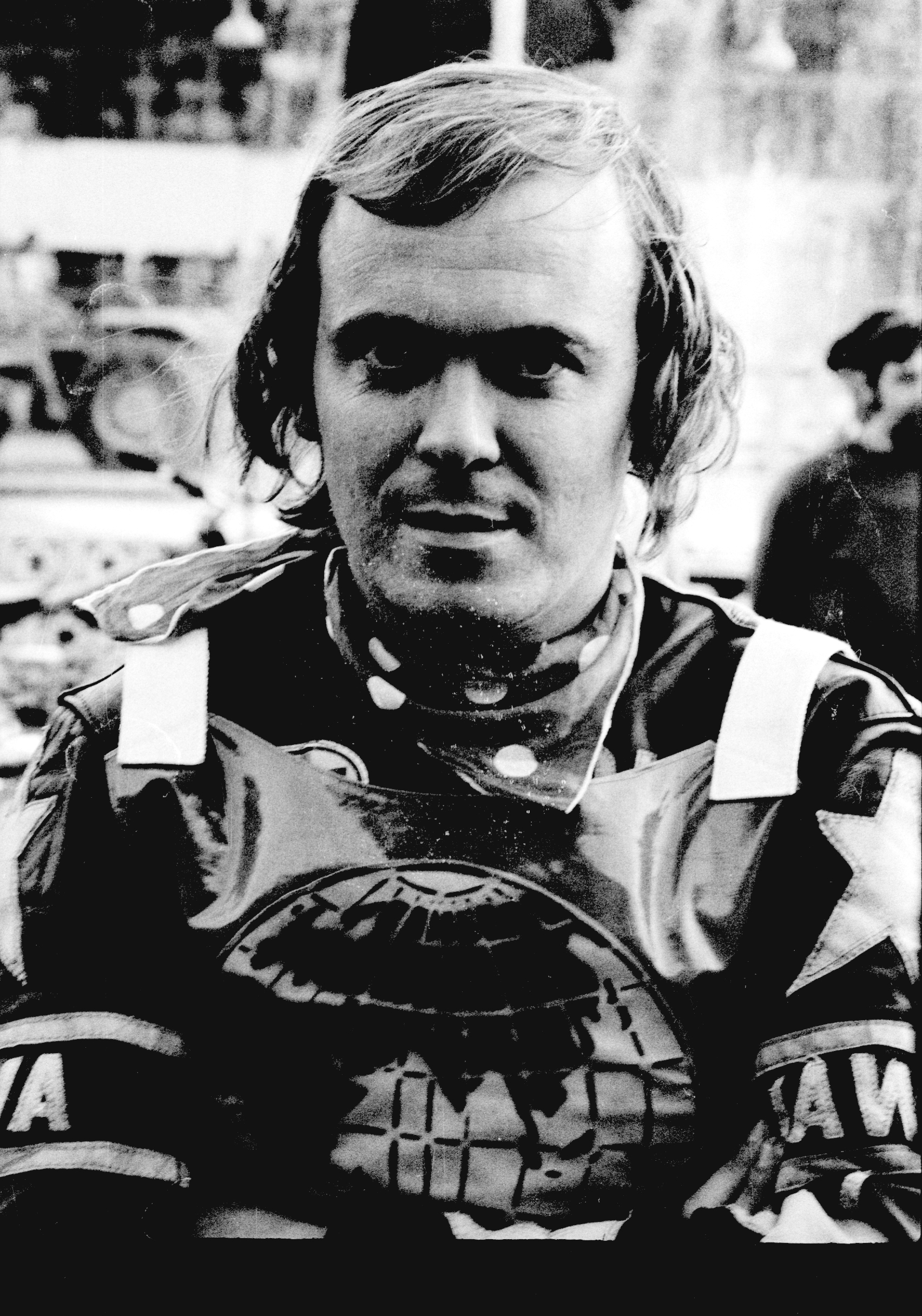
- Ole Olsen extended his Danish Championship record to twelve titles and won the Danish World Championship qualifier.

The 1981 Danish speedway season was the 1981 season of motorcycle speedway in Denmark.

== Individual ==
=== Danish Final (world championship round) ===
Six riders from the Danish final would progress to the Nordic Final as part of the 1981 Individual Speedway World Championship. The final was held on 10 May at Fredericia, and was won by Ole Olsen.

Final

Pos.	Rider	Total
1	Ole Olsen	15
2	Bo Petersen	13
3	Erik Gundersen	12+3
4	Tommy Knudsen	12+2
5	Hans Nielsen	12+1
6	Jens Henry Nielsen	8+3
7	Finn Thomsen	8+2
8	Preben Eriksen	8+1
9	Finn Rune Jensen	7
10	Mikael Lohmann	7
11	Bent Rasmussen	5
12	Steen Mastrup	5
13	Hans Ove Christiansen	4
14	Bent Juul Larsen	3
15	Finn Lundahl (res)	1
16	Svend Lund	0
17	Klaus Lohman	0

=== Individual Championship ===
The 1981 Danish Individual Speedway Championship was the 1981 edition of the Danish Individual Speedway Championship. The final was held at Vojens on 21 September. The title was won by Ole Olsen for the 12th time.

Final

Pos.	Rider	Total
1	Ole Olsen	15
2	Hans Nielsen	14
3	Tommy Knudsen	11
4	Erik Gundersen	10
5	Finn Thomsen	10
6	Bent Rasmussen	10
7	Bo Petersen	8
8	Preben Eriksen	8
9	John Eskildsen	8
10	Flemming Pedersen	7
11	Finn Lundahl	6
12	Svend Lund	5
13	Casper Christensen	5
14	Kjeld Hansen	5
15	Poul E. Nielsen	4
16	Finn Rune Jensen	3

Key - Each heat has four riders, 3 points for a heat win, 2 for 2nd, 1 for third and 0 for last

=== Junior Championship ===
Sam Nikolajsen won the Junior Championship.

== Team ==
=== Danish Tournament ===
The 1981 Danish Tournament was won by Vikingerne Esbjerg (the Vikings), who became Danish champions for the 7th time in their history.

Division 1 league table

Pos	Team	P	Pts
1	Vikingerne Esbjerg	10	29
2	Tigers Holsted	10	25
3	Rodspaetterne Frederikshavn	10	22
4	Leoparderne Fjelsted	10	22
5	Blabjergdrengene Outrup	10	21
6	Goodyear-drengene Vojens	10	20
7	Hanerne Hanherred	10	15
8	Kulsvierne Frederiksborg	10	15
9	Uldjyderne Herning	10	13
10	Faestningsdrengene	10	12
11	Falkene Silkeborg	10	12
12	Piraterne Århus	10	10
13	Skansedrengene Fredericia	10	9
14	Klitrengene Esbjerg	10	8
15	Panthers Holsted	10	5
16	Fighters Vojens	10	2

Division 2 league table

Pos	Team	P	Pts
1	Cometerne Fjelsted	10	30
2	Ulvene Midtsjaellands	10	27
3	Laksene Randers	10	25
4	Loverne Haderslev	10	22
5	Drabanterne Frederiksborg	10	22
6	Cimbrerne Aalborg	10	16
7	Vestjyderne Outrup	10	16
8	Hajerne Frederikshavn	10	13
9	Raketterne Fjelsted	10	12
10	Fladbrodrdrengene Randers	10	12
11	Skovtroldene Frederiksborg	10	9
12	Svanerne Munkebo	10	9
13	Wildcats Holsted	10	9
14	Pythonerne Århus	10	7
15	Urhanerne Herning	10	6
16	Fynborne Odin Odense	10	4

Division 3A league table

Pos	Team	P	Pts
1	Ulveungerne Midtsjaellands	8	20
2	Kingodrengene Frederiksborg	8	12
3	Jetterne Amager	8	9
4	Stjernerne Fjelsted	8	7

Division 3B league table

Pos	Team	P	Pts
1	Ravnene Hanherred	8	19
2	Satelitterne Fjelsted	8	16
3	Magerne Bogense	8	14
4	Volddrengene Fredericia	8	10
5	Rekruttererne Munkebo	8	1
