= 1980 Danish speedway season =

Season of speedway in Denmark

The 1980 Danish speedway season was the 1980 season of motorcycle speedway in Denmark.

== Individual ==
=== Danish Final (world championship round) ===
Three riders from the Danish final would progress to the Nordic Final as part of the 1980 Individual Speedway World Championship. The final was held on 4 May at Fredericia, and was won by Bo Petersen. Only 3 riders qualified for the Nordic final because Ole Olsen, Hans Nielsen and Finn Thomsen were already seeded through to the Nordic final.

Final

Pos.	Rider	Total
1	Bo Petersen	15
2	Preben Eriksen	13
3	Bent Rasmussen	12+3
4	Finn Rune Jensen	12+2
5	Finn Thomsen	10
6	Mike Lohmann	8
7	Alf Busk	8
8	Jens Henry Nielsen	7
9	Lars Vinding	6
10	Arne Cruse	6
11	Gunnar Hansen	6
12	Finn Lundahl	5
13	Steen Mastrup	5
14	Hans Ove Cristiansen	3
15	Svend Lund	3
16	Gunnar Svendsen	1

=== Individual Championship ===
The 1980 Danish Individual Speedway Championship was the 1980 edition of the Danish Individual Speedway Championship. The final was held at Fjelsted on 17 August. The title was won by Bo Petersen.

Final

Pos.	Rider	Total
1	Bo Petersen	15
2	Erik Gundersen	13
3	Bent Rasmussen	12
4	Hans Nielsen	11
5	Finn Thomsen	11
6	Ole Olsen	10
7	Preben Eriksen	10
8	Jens Henry Nielsen	5
9	Hans Albert Klinge	5
10	Steen Mastrup	5
11	Hans Ove Cristiansen	4
12	Finn Rune Jensen	4
13	Svend Lund	4
14	Rene Christiansen	2
15	Tommy Knudsen	2
16	Bent Juul Larsen	0

Key - Each heat has four riders, 3 points for a heat win, 2 for 2nd, 1 for third and 0 for last

=== Junior Championship ===
John Eskildsen won the Junior Championship.

== Team ==
=== Danish Tournament ===
The 1980 Danish Tournament was won by Vikingerne Esbjerg (the Vikings), who became Danish champions for the 6th time in their history.

Division 1 league table

Pos	Team	P	Pts
1	Vikingerne Esbjerg	10	29
2	Tigers Holsted	10	24
3	Blabjergdrengene Outrup	10	24
4	Goodyear-drengene Vojens	10	20
5	Leoparderne Fjelsted	10	19
6	Uldjyderne Herning	10	18
7	Hanerne Hanherred	10	17
8	Kulsvierne Frederiksborg	10	13
9	Piraterne Århus	10	12
10	Rodspaetterne Frederikshavn	10	12
11	Faestningsdrengene	10	12
12	Falkene Silkeborg	10	12
13	Panthers Holsted	10	12
14	Prinserne Viborg	10	11
15	Ulvene Midtsjaellands	10	5
16	Hvepsene Haderslev	10	0

Division 2 league table

Pos	Team	P	Pts
1	Fighters Vojens	10	28
2	Klitrengene Esbjerg	10	26
3	Skansedrengene Fredericia	10	23
4	Drabanterne Frederiksborg	10	23
5	Cometerne Fjelsted	10	21
6	Cimbrerne Aalborg	10	19
7	Raketterne Fjelsted	10	18
8	Hajerne Frederikshavn	10	17
9	Vestjyderne Outrup	10	13
10	Skovtroldene Frederiksborg	10	13
11	Neutronerne Viborg	10	10
12	Urhanerne Herning	10	9
13	Fynborne Odin Odense	10	8
14	Pythonerne Århus	10	5
15	Jetterne Amager	10	4
16	Roverbanden Vissenbjerg/Bred	10	3

Division 3A league table

Pos	Team	P	Pts
1	Laksene Randers	8	21
2	Stjernerne Fjelsted	8	13
3	Kingodrengene Frederiksborg	8	4
4	Ravnene Hanherred	8	4

Division 3B league table

Pos	Team	P	Pts
1	Satelitterne Fjelsted	8	17
2	Svanerne Munkebo	8	13
3	Fladbrodrdrengene Randers	8	12
4	Wildcats Holsted	8	11
5	Magerne Bogense	8	1
