= 1984 Danish speedway season =

Season of speedway in Denmark

The 1984 Danish speedway season was the 1984 season of motorcycle speedway in Denmark.

== Individual ==
=== Danish Final (world championship round) ===
Six riders from the Danish final would progress to the Nordic Final as part of the 1984 Individual Speedway World Championship. The final was held on 6 May at Randers, and was won by Bo Petersen.

Final

Pos.	Rider	Total
1	Bo Petersen	14+3
2	Erik Gundersen	14+2
3	Hans Nielsen	14+1
4	John Eskildsen	10
5	Jens Rasmussen	9+3
6	John Jørgensen	9+2
7	Preben Eriksen	9+1
8	Finn Thomsen	9+0(ef)
9	Kent Noer	8
10	Jan O. Pedersen	7
11	Flemming Pedersen	6
12	Brian Jacobsen	4
13	Jens-Henry Nielsen	2
14	Per Sørensen	2
15	Sam Nikolajsen	1
16	Finn Rune Jensen	1

=== Individual Championship ===
The 1984 Danish Individual Speedway Championship was the 1984 edition of the Danish Individual Speedway Championship. The final was held at Brovst in August. The title was won by Erik Gundersen for the second consecutive year.

Final

Pos.	Rider	Club	Total
1	Erik Gundersen	EMS	13+3
2	John Eskildsen	HeMS	13+2
3	Hans Nielsen	HaMK	12
4	Peter Ravn	RMS	11
5	Bo Petersen	FSK	11
6	Preben Eriksen	FSK	11
7	John Jørgensen	FSK	10
8	Sam Nikolajsen	FrMS	8
9	Tommy Knudsen	VSK	7
10	Flemming Rasmussen	FSK	7
11	Fleming Pedersen	EMS	7
12	Alf Busk	SMS	3
13	Knud E. Knudsen	HaMK	2
14	Brian Jacobsen	EMS	2
15	Finn Rune Jensen	VSK	1
16	Rene Christiansen	VSK	0

Key - Each heat has four riders, 3 points for a heat win, 2 for 2nd, 1 for third and 0 for last

=== Junior Championship ===
Jan Jakobsen won the Junior Championship.

== Team ==
=== Danish Tournament ===
The 1984 Danish Tournament was won by Vikingerne Esbjerg (the Vikings), who became Danish champions for the 8th time in their history.

Division 1 league table

Pos	Team	P	Pts
1	Vikingerne Esbjerg	10	27
2	Leoparderne Fjelsted	10	27
3	Tigers Holsted	10	26
4	Gepards Vojens	10	25
5	Faestningsdrengene	10	21
6	Kulsvierne Frederiksborg	10	18
7	Rodspaetterne Frederikshavn	10	17
8	Cometerne Fjelsted	10	17
9	Hanerne Hanherred	10	14
10	Klitrengene Esbjerg	10	10
11	Blabjergdrengene Outrup	10	10
12	Laksene Randers	10	8
13	Drabanterne Frederiksborg	10	8
14	Skansedrengene Fredericia	10	6
15	Uldjyderne Herning	10	2
16	Falkene Silkeborg	10	1

Division 2 league table

Pos	Team	P	Pts
1	Ulvene Midtsjaellands	10	30
2	Panthers Holsted	10	27
3	Fighters Vojens	10	26
4	Stjernerne Fjelsted	10	23
5	Hajerne Frederikshavn	10	21
6	Raketterne Fjelsted	10	20
7	Svanerne Munkebo	10	15
8	Skovtroldene Frederiksborg	10	13
9	Jokerne Esbjerg	10	13
10	Fladbrodrdrengene Randers	10	13
11	Magerne Bogense	10	10
12	Pythonerne Århus	10	9
13	Urhanerne Herning	10	7
14	Volddrengene Fredericia	10	5
15	Jetterne Amager	10	5
16	Vestjyderne Outrup	10	3

Division 3 league table

Pos	Team	P	Pts
1	Hunters Vojens	8	21
2	Ulveungerne Midtsjaellands	8	17
3	Ravnene Hanherred	8	14
4	Fynborne Odin Odense	8	7
5	Prinserne Viborg	8	1
