= 1972 Danish speedway season =

Season of speedway in Denmark

The 1972 Danish speedway season was the 1972 season of motorcycle speedway in Denmark.

== Individual ==
=== Danish Final (world championship round) ===
Eight riders (Henning Hansen, Fred Hansen, Erik Tillgaard, Jörn Mogensen, Preben Bollerup, Kurt Bögh, Bent Nørregaard-Jensen and Nils Schelde) competed in the three Nordic qualification rounds, as part of the 1972 Individual Speedway World Championship. None of the Nordic qualifiers was held in Denmark.

=== Individual Championship ===
The 1972 Danish Individual Speedway Championship was the 1972 edition of the Danish Individual Speedway Championship. The final was held at Esbjerg on 17 September. The title was won by Ole Olsen for the 6th time.

Final

Pos.	Rider	Total
1	Ole Olsen	15
2	Bent Nørregaard-Jensen	13
3	Niels Schelde	12
4	Kurt Bøgh	11
5	Arne Andreasen	10
6	Otto Larsen	9
7	Ervin J. Hansen	8
8	Hans Hansen	8
9	Frank Jahn	8
10	Jörn Morgensen	7
11	Erik Gron	5
12	Henning Edsberg	4
13	Erling Rasmussen	4
14	Erik Tillgard	3
15	Kurt Schelde	2
16	Mogens Dam	1

Key - Each heat has four riders, 3 points for a heat win, 2 for 2nd, 1 for third and 0 for last

=== Junior Championship ===
Ole Hermansen won the Junior Championship.

== Team ==
=== Danish Tournament ===
The 1972 Danish Tournament was won by Vikingerne Esbjerg, who became Danish champions for the 5th time. The tournament changed format in that each match now featured four teams, instead of a head to head format that had been previously used.

Division 1 league table

Pos	Team	P	Pts
1	Vikingerne Esbjerg	8	19
2	Faestningsdrengene Fredericia	8	13
3	Piraterne Århus	8	11
4	Klitrengene Esbjerg	8	10
5	Løverne Haderslev	8	1

Division 2 East

Pos	Team	P	Pts
1	Ulvene Midtsjaellands	8	21
2	Kulsvierne Hillerød	8	14
3	Ulveungerne Midtsjaellands	8	4
4	Drabanterne Hillerød	8	3

Division 2 North

Pos	Team	P	Pts
1	Skansedrengene Fredericia	8	22
2	Ørnene Silkeborg	8	19
3	Laksene Randers	8	14
4	Pythonerne Århus	8	11
5	Uldjyderne Herning	8	6
6	Falkene Silkeborg	8	0

Division 2 South

Pos	Team	P	Pts
1	Fynborne Odin Odense	8	21
2	Volddrengene Fredericia	8	20
3	Esserne Esbjerg	8	10
4	Jokerne Esbjerg	8	8
5	Brodrenene Fredericia	8	8
6	Hvepsene Haderslev	8	5

Division 2 Play off Group

Pos	Team	Pts
1	Skansedrengene Fredericia	10
2	Fynborne Odin Odense	9
3	Ulvene Midtsjaellands	7
4	Volddrengene Fredericia	4
