= 1971 Danish speedway season =

Season of speedway in Denmark

The 1971 Danish speedway season was the 1971 season of motorcycle speedway in Denmark.

== Individual ==
=== Danish Final (world championship round) ===
Seven riders (Ole Olsen, Bent Nørregaard-Jensen, Kurt Bögh, Bjarne Nyegaard, Niels Weiss Sorensen, Jörn Mogensen and Preben Rosenkilde) competed in the Nordic final round, as part of the 1971 Individual Speedway World Championship. It was held in Hillerød on 6 June.

=== Individual Championship ===
The 1971 Danish Individual Speedway Championship was the 1971 edition of the Danish Individual Speedway Championship. The final was held at Fredericia on 26 September. The title was won by Ole Olsen for the fifth time.

Final

Pos.	Rider	Club	Total
1	Ole Olsen	Haderslev	15
2	Kurt Bøgh	Fredericia	13
3	Bent Nørregaard-Jensen	Esbjerg	12
4	Henning E. Hansen	Odense	11
5	Jörn Morgensen	Silkeborg	10
6	Preben Bollerup	Esbjerg	9
7	Bjarne Nygaard	Esbjerg	8
8	Arne Andreasen	Odense	8
9	Godtfred Andreasen	Fredericia	7
10	Jorgen Kinnerup	Midtsjaellands	7
11	F S Hansen		5
12	Bent Larsen	Esbjerg	4
13	Mogens Dam	Århus	3
14	Preben S. Pedersen	Hillerød	3
15	Preben Rosenkilde	Aalborg	2

Key - Each heat has four riders, 3 points for a heat win, 2 for 2nd, 1 for third and 0 for last

=== Junior Championship ===
Ervin Hansen won the Junior Championship.

== Team ==
=== Danish Tournament ===
The 1971 Danish Tournament was won by Vikingerne Esbjerg, who became Danish champions for the fourth time.

Division 1 league table

Pos	Team	P	W	D	L	Pts
1	Vikingerne Esbjerg	8	7	0	1	14
2	Faestningsdrengene Fredericia	8	6	0	2	12
3	Løverne Haderslev	8	3	0	5	6
4	Fynborne Odin Odense	8	2	0	6	4
5	Ulvene Midtsjaellands	8	2	0	6	4

Division 2 league table

Pos	Team	P	W	D	L	Pts
1	Klitrengene Esbjerg	10	9	0	1	18
2	Piraterne Århus	10	7	0	3	14
3	Ørnene Silkeborg	10	6	0	4	12
4	Kulsvierne Hillerød	10	5	0	5	10
5	Cimbrerne Aalborg	10	3	0	7	6
6	Uldjyderne Herning	10	0	0	10	0
