= 1968 Danish speedway season =

Season of speedway in Denmark

The 1968 Danish speedway season was the 1968 season of motorcycle speedway in Denmark.

== Individual ==
=== World championship round ===
Five riders (Ole Olsen, Godtfred Andreasen, Kurt Bögh, Preben Möller Christiensen and Jens Ring competed in the Nordic final, as part of the 1968 Individual Speedway World Championship. The final was held at Hillerød on 2 June.

=== Individual Championship ===
The 1968 Danish Individual Speedway Championship was the 1968 edition of the Danish Individual Speedway Championship. The final was held at Esbjerg on 15 September. The title was won by Ole Olsen for the second time.

Final

Pos.	Rider	Points
1	Ole Olsen	15
2	Bent Nørregaard-Jensen	14
3	Kurt Bögh	11+3
4	Preben Möller Christiensen	11+2
5	Preben S. Pedersen	10
6	Jens Ring	10
7	Godtfred Andreasen	9
8	Jørn Mogensen	9
9	Erik Grön	7
10	Arne Andreasen	6
11	Henning E. Hansen	5
12	Per Ehlert	4
13	Jørgen Kinnerup	3
14	Hans Walther Johansen	3
15	Ole Thygesen	2
16	Erikl Jensen	0

=== Junior Championship ===
Preben Rosenkilde won the Junior Championship.

== Team ==
=== Danish Tournament ===
The 1968 Danish Tournament was the second season of the new era of league speedway in Denmark. Faestningsdrengene Fredericia became Danish champions for the first time.

Division 1 league table

Pos	Team
1	Faestningsdrengene Fredericia
2	Løverne Haderslev
3	Kulsvierne Hillerød
4	Cimbrerne Aalborg
5	Uldjyderne Herning
6	Vikingerne Esbjerg
7	Ulvene Midtsjaellands
8	Volddrengene Fredericia
