= 1969 Danish speedway season =

Season of speedway in Denmark

The 1969 Danish speedway season was the 1969 season of motorcycle speedway in Denmark.

== Individual ==
=== World championship round ===
Five riders (Ole Olsen, Bent Nørregaard-Jensen, Kurt Bögh, Godtfred Andreasen and Jens Ring competed in the Nordic qualifying rounds but only Olsen reached the final, as part of the 1969 Individual Speedway World Championship.

=== Individual Championship ===
The 1969 Danish Individual Speedway Championship was the 1969 edition of the Danish Individual Speedway Championship. The final was held at Esbjerg on 21 September. The title was won by Ole Olsen for the third time.

Final

Pos.	Rider	Points
1	Ole Olsen	15
2	Bent Nørregaard-Jensen	13
3	Niels Weiss Sorensen	13
4	Preben Bollerup	13
5	Godtfred Andreasen	11
6	Jørn Mogensen	8
7	Karl Korneliussen	8
8	Jens Ring	6
9	Bjarne Nyegaard	6
10	Henning E. Hansen	5
11	John V. Hansen	5
12	Preben Möller Christiensen	5
13	Preben S. Pedersen	5
14	B. O. Christiensen	4
15	Preben Rosenkilde	2
16	Jørgen Kinnerup	1
17	Hans Hansen	0

=== Junior Championship ===
Bent Juul Larsen won the Junior Championship.

== Team ==
=== Danish Tournament ===
The 1969 Danish Tournament was won by Vikingerne Esbjerg, who became Danish champions for the second time.

Division 1 league table

Pos	Team
1	Vikingerne Esbjerg
2	Faestningsdrengene Fredericia
3	Kulsvierne Hillerød
4	Løverne Haderslev
5	Cimbrerne Aalborg
