= 1970 Danish speedway season =

Season of speedway in Denmark

The 1970 Danish speedway season was the 1970 season of motorcycle speedway in Denmark.

== Individual ==
=== Danish Final (world championship round) ===
Three riders (Ole Olsen, Bent Nørregaard-Jensen and Niels Weiss Sorensen competed in the Nordic final, as part of the 1970 Individual Speedway World Championship.

=== Individual Championship ===
The 1970 Danish Individual Speedway Championship was the 1970 edition of the Danish Individual Speedway Championship. The final was held at Hillerød on 20 September. The title was won by Ole Olsen for the fourth time.

Final

Pos.	Rider	Club
1	Ole Olsen	Haderslev
2	Bent Nørregaard-Jensen	Esbjerg
3	Kurt Bøgh	Fredericia
u	Preben Bollerup	Esbjerg
u	Erik Thillgaard	Haderslev
u	Jens Ring	Hillerød
u	Preben Roskilde	Randers
u	Finn Schelde	Esbjerg
u	Jørn Mogensen	Fredericia
u	Bjarne Nyegaard	Haderslev
u	Erik Grøn	Fredericia
u	Arne Andreasen	Odense
u	Henning Edsbjerg	Odense
u	Bent Larsen	Esbjerg
u	Niels Weis	Herning
u	Jørgen Kinnerup	Midtsjaellands
u	Karl Korneliussen (res)	Aarhus
u	Frank Jahn (res)	Herning
u	Ole Nielsen (res)	Hillerød

U = unplaced, not in top three

=== Junior Championship ===
Niels Hansen won the Junior Championship.

== Team ==
=== Danish Tournament ===
The 1970 Danish Tournament was won by Vikingerne Esbjerg, who became Danish champions for the third time.

Division 1 league table

Pos	Team	P	W	D	L	Pts
1	Vikingerne Esbjerg	6	6	0	0	12
2	Faestningsdrengene Fredericia	6	2	1	3	5
3	Ulvene Midtsjaellands	6	1	1	4	3
4	Kulsvierne Hillerød	6	1	0	5	2
5	Skovtroldene Hillerød	0	0	0	0	0

Division 2 league table

Pos	Team	P	W	D	L	Pts
1	Fynborne Odin Odense	10	8	1	1	17
2	Løverne Haderslev	10	6	0	4	12
3	Cimbrerne Aalborg	10	5	1	4	11
4	Piraterne Århus	10	4	1	5	9
5	Uldjyderne Herning	10	4	0	6	8
6	Klitrengene Esbjerg	10	1	1	8	3
