= 1967 Danish speedway season =

Season of speedway in Denmark

The 1967 Danish speedway season was the 1967 season of motorcycle speedway in Denmark. The season was particularly important because it was the first time a league tournament had been organised since the demise of the amateur league at the end of 1959.

== Individual ==
=== World championship round ===
Four riders (Ole Olsen, Godtfred Andreasen, Kurt Bögh and Poul Wissing competed in the Nordic qualifying rounds and only Olsen reached the Nordic final, as part of the 1967 Individual Speedway World Championship.

=== Individual Championship ===
The 1967 Danish Individual Speedway Championship was the 1967 edition of the Danish Individual Speedway Championship. The final was held at Hillerød on 24 September. The title was won by Ole Olsen for the first time.

Final

Pos.	Rider	Points
1	Ole Olsen	15
2	Kurt Bögh	12
3	Hans Walther Johansen	12

=== Junior Championship ===
Bent Nørregaard-Jensen won the Junior Championship.

== Team ==
=== Danish Tournament ===
The 1967 Danish Tournament was the inaugural season of a new era of league speedway in Denmark. The previous attempt to hold league speedway in Denmark took place from 1956 to 1959.

The new tournament consisted of seven teams -

- Cimbrerne (The Cimbri of Aalborg)
- Faestningsdrengene (The Fortess Boys of Fredericia)
- Fynborne Odin (Fynborne Odin from Odense)
- Kulsvierne (The Charcoalers of Hillerød)
- Løverne (The Lions of Haderslev)
- Uldjyderne (The Wool Traders of Herning)
- Vikingerne (The Vikings of Esbjerg)

Vikingerne Esbjerg became Danish champions for the first time. The team included Bent Nørregaard-Jensen, Poul Wissing, Kurt Bøgh, Soren Schelde, Finn Rasmussen, Preben Bollerup and Quay Ove Larsen. Poul Wissing was killed during a race in East Germany later in the season.

Final league table

Pos	Team	P	Pts
1	Vikingerne Esbjerg	10	10
2	Faestningsdrengene Fredericia	10	10
3	Uldjyderne Herning	10	
4	Kulsvierne Hillerød	10	
5	Cimbrerne Aalborg	10	
6	Fynborne Odin Odense	10	
7	Løverne Haderslev	10	
