= 1975 Speedway World Pairs Championship =

6th official edition of the World motorcycle speedway Pairs Championship

1975 World Pairs Championship

Seasons
- ← 1974 1976 →

The 1975 Speedway World Pairs Championship was the sixth FIM Speedway World Pairs Championship. The final took place in Wrocław, Poland.

The championship was won by Sweden (24 points), who beat host nation Poland (23 pts) and Denmark (20 points).

== Semifinal 1 ==
- (Denmark) Fredericia Speedway Stadium, Fredericia
- 25 May

Placing	Pair / Rider Name	Total	1	2	3	4	5	6	7	8	9	10	11	12	13	14	15	16	17	18	19	20	21	22
1	Denmark	24							7							14							24
1	(7) Ole Olsen	18		3				3			3					3				3			3
1	(8) Bent Nørregaard-Jensen	6		1				0			1					0				2			2
2	Sweden	22 +3							10							16							22
2	(13) Anders Michanek	13				3			3			2				2			3		X
2	(14) Sören Sjösten	9				2			2			1				1			2		1			3
3	Australia	22 +2							7							12							22
3	(3) Phil Crump	10	2				X				X			2				3			3
3	(4) John Boulger	12	3				2				2			1				2			2			2
4	New Zealand	20							5							11							20
4	(9) Gary Peterson	12			X			1				3		3			2					3
4	(10) Bruce Cribb	8			2			2				0		0			3					1
5	Norway	16							5							14							16
5	(11) Reidar Eide	8			3				1				1		3			0					0
5	(12) Edgar Stangeland	8			1				0				3		2			1					1
6	Finland	14							6							11							14
6	(5) Veli-Pekka Teromaa	2		0			1			1					0				0			0
6	(6) Ila Teromaa	12		2			3			3					1				1			2
7	(Netherlands) Nederlands	8							2							6							8
7	(1) Henny Kroeze	8	1			1				2			2				1			1
7	(2) Frits Koppe	0	0			0				0			X				0			0
Placing	Pair / Rider Name	Total	1	2	3	4	5	6	7	8	9	10	11	12	13	14	15	16	17	18	19	20	21	22

m - exclusion for exceeding two minute time allowance • t - exclusion for touching the tapes • x - other exclusion • e - retired or mechanical failure • f - fell
ns - non-starter • nc - non-classify

gate A - inside	gate B	gate C	gate D - outside

== Semifinal 2 ==
- (Socialist Federal Republic of Yugoslavia) Kovinar Stadium, Maribor
- 26 May

Placing	Pair / Rider Name	Total	1	2	3	4	5	6	7	8	9	10	11	12	13	14	15	16	17	18	19	20	21
1	West Germany	27							10							18							27
1	(7) Christoph Betzl	17		3				3			3					2				3			3
1	(8) Fritz Baur	10		2				2			2					1				2			1
2	England	23							10							16							23
2	(13) John Louis	16				2			3			3				3			2		3
2	(14) Ray Wilson	7				3			2			0				0			1		1
3	Austria	22							6							14							22
3	(11) Adi Funk	14			3				0				3		3			2					3
3	(12) Herbert Szerecs	8			2				1				2		0			3					0
4	Yugoslavia	18							6							12							18
4	(5) Stefan Kekec	13		1			3			2					1				3			3
4	(6) Juro Fleten	5		0			2			1					2				0			0
5	Hungary	16							6							10							16
5	(1) Janos Szöke	6	2			0				0			1				3			0
5	(2) Istvan Sziraczky	10	3			1				3			0				2			1
6	Italy	11							2							8							11
6	(9) Annibale Pretto	1			0			0				1		0			0					0
6	(10) Dario Casarsa	10			1			1				2		3			1					2
7	Yugoslavia B	9							2							6							9
7	(3) Josip Francic	5	1				0				1			2				1			0
7	(4) Vlado Kocuvan	4	0				1				0			1				0			2
Placing	Pair / Rider Name	Total	1	2	3	4	5	6	7	8	9	10	11	12	13	14	15	16	17	18	19	20	21

m - exclusion for exceeding two minute time allowance • t - exclusion for touching the tapes • x - other exclusion • e - retired or mechanical failure • f - fell
ns - non-starter • nc - non-classify

gate A - inside	gate B	gate C	gate D - outside

== World final ==
- (Poland) Olympic Stadium, Wrocław
- 15 June

Placing	Pair / Rider Name	Total	1	2	3	4	5	6	7	8	9	10	11	12	13	14	15	16	17	18	19	20	21
1	Sweden	24							8							17							24
1	(7) Anders Michanek	17		2				3			3					3				3			3
1	(8) Tommy Jansson	7		1				2			2					1				0			1
2	Poland	23							8							15							23
2	(13) Edward Jancarz	15				2			3			3				2			2		3
2	(14) Piotr Bruzda	8				3			E			2				0			1		2
3	Denmark	20							8							14							20
3	(5) Ole Olsen	18+3		3			3			3					3				3			3
3	(6) Jan Henningsen	2		E			2			0					0				F			0
4	England	20							6							12							20
4	(1) John Louis	13+2	3			0				2			3				3			2
4	(2) Peter Collins	7	2			1				1			E				2			1
5	Australia	19							8							14							19
5	(11) Phil Crump	10			2				2				2		2			0					2
5	(12) John Boulger	9			3				1				1		1			3					0
6	West Germany	10							2							6							10
6	(3) Christoph Betzl	6	1				0				0			3				2			0
6	(4) Fritz Baur	4	0				1				1			E				1			1
7	Austria	10							2							6							10
7	(9) Herbert Szerecs	4			1			E				0		2			0					1
7	(10) Adi Funk	6			0			1				1		1			1					2
Placing	Pair / Rider Name	Total	1	2	3	4	5	6	7	8	9	10	11	12	13	14	15	16	17	18	19	20	21

m - exclusion for exceeding two minute time allowance • t - exclusion for touching the tapes • x - other exclusion • e - retired or mechanical failure • f - fell
ns - non-starter • nc - non-classify

gate A - inside	gate B	gate C	gate D - outside

== See also ==
- 1975 Individual Speedway World Championship
- 1975 Speedway World Team Cup
- motorcycle speedway
- 1975 in sports
