= Claus Jacobsen =

Danish speedway rider

- Born: 21 September 1971 (age 55); Esbjerg, Denmark
- Nationality: Danish

Career history

Denmark
- 1989: Esbjerg
- 1992–1994: Holstebro

Great Britain
- 1993: Arena Essex Hammers
- 1993: Ipswich Witches

Individual honours
- 1994: Danish Championship silver medal

Claus Jacobsen (born 21 September 1971) is a former motorcycle speedway rider from Denmark. He earned 3 caps for the Denmark national speedway team.

== Career ==
Jacobsen came to prominence when he reached 1989 Speedway Under-21 World Championship final, where he finished eighth.

Jacobsen made his British leagues debut in 1993, when he joined the Arena Essex Hammers. Late in the 1993 season, he moved to Ipswich Witches for the remainder of the 1993 British League season.

During the 1994 Danish speedway season, Jacobsen won the silver medal in the Danish Championship, after finishing behind Hans Nielsen.
