= 1994 Danish speedway season =

Season of speedway in Denmark

The 1994 Danish speedway season was the 1994 season of motorcycle speedway in Denmark.

== Individual ==
=== Individual Championship ===
The 1994 Danish Individual Speedway Championship was the 1994 edition of the Danish Individual Speedway Championship. The final was held over 2 rounds at Holstebro on 28 May and at Randers on 29 May. The title was won by Hans Nielsen for the sixth time.

Five riders from the Danish final would progress to the Nordic Final as part of the 1994 Individual Speedway World Championship.

Final

| Pos. | Rider | Team | Scores | Total |
|---|---|---|---|---|
| 1 | Hans Nielsen | Brovst | 10,14 | 24 |
| 2 | Claus Jacobsen | Holstebro | 11,11 | 22 |
| 3 | Gert Handberg | Slangerup | 11,10 | 21 |
| 4 | Tommy Knudsen | Fredericia | 11,9 | 20 |
| 5 | Jan Stæchmann | Fredericia | 10,10 | 20 |
| 6 | Martin Vinther | Fredericia | 9,9 | 18 |
| 7 | John Jørgensen | Fjelsted | 6,11 | 17 |
| 8 | Jacob Olsen | Vojens | 9,7 | 16 |
| 9 | Brian Karger | Fredericia | 9,7 | 16 |
| 10 | Brian Andersen | Fredericia | 7,6 | 13 |
| 11 | Frede Schött | Fredericia | 7,6 | 13 |
| 12 | Ole Hansen | Fredericia | 7,4 | 11 |
| 13 | Jan Andersen | Fredericia | 4,4 | 8 |
| 14 | Ronni Pedersen (res) | Fjelsted | 2,6 | 8 |
| 15 | Morten Andersen | Fjelsted | 6,0 | 6 |
| 16 | Søren Damgaard (res) | Randers | 0,5 | 5 |
| 17 | Bo Skov Eriksen | Holsted | 1,1 | 2 |
| 18 | Kjeld Mikklesen | Herning | 0,0 | 0 |

Key - Each heat has four riders, 3 points for a heat win, 2 for 2nd, 1 for third and 0 for last

=== Junior Championship ===
Klaus Rasmussen won the Junior Championship.

== Team ==
=== Danish Superliga ===
The 1994 season was won by Holsted for the 6th time.

| Pos | Team | P | Pts |
|---|---|---|---|
| 1 | Holsted | 14 | 35 |
| 2 | Fredericia | 14 | 34 |
| 3 | Randers | 14 | 25 |
| 4 | Herning | 14 | 22 |
| 5 | Fjelsted | 14 | 19 |
| 6 | Holstebro | 14 | 19 |
| 7 | Slangerup | 14 | 14 |
| 8 | Brovst | 14 | 0 |
