= 1999 Danish speedway season =

Season of speedway in Denmark

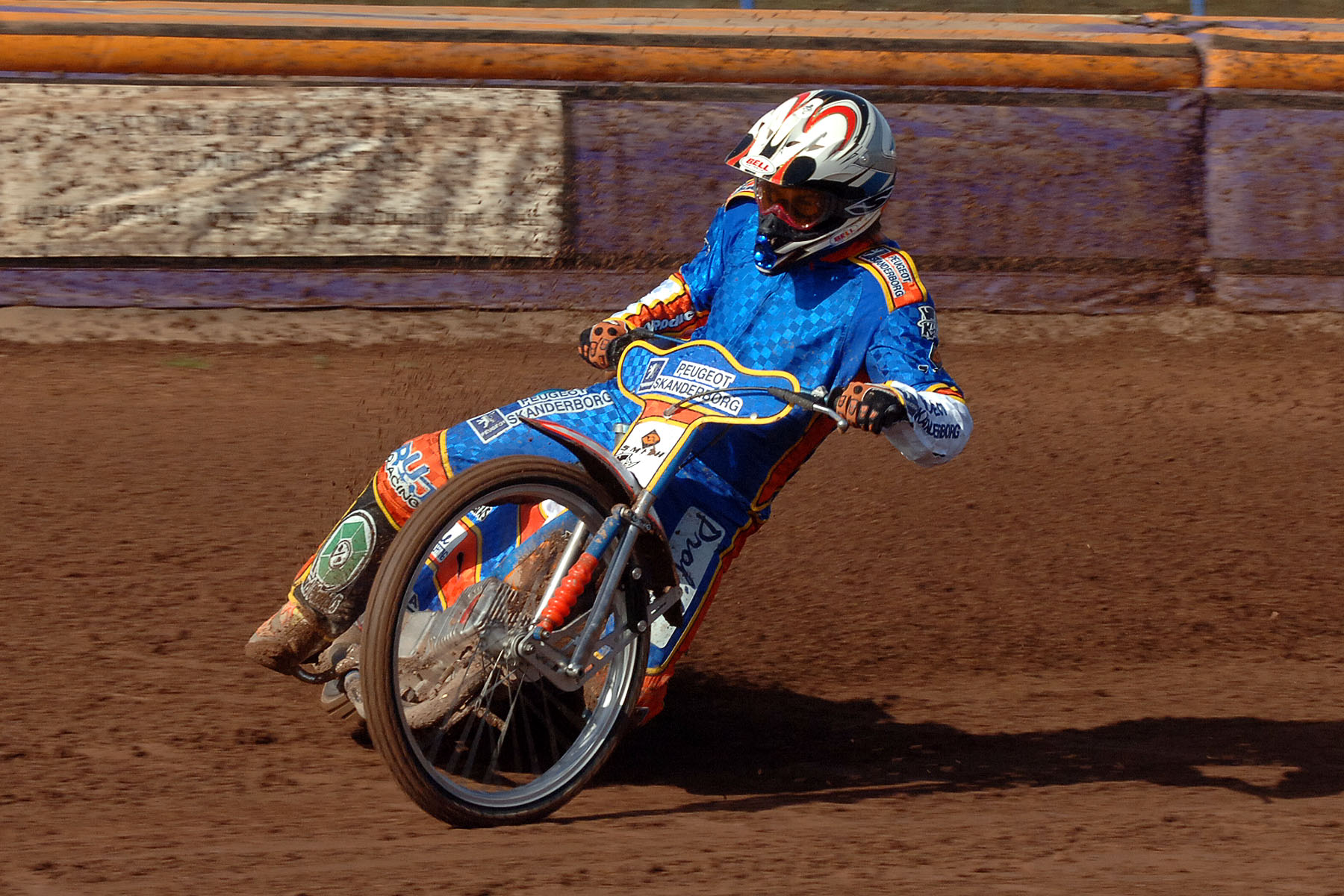
- Mads Korneliussen, 1999 Danish junior champion

The 1999 Danish speedway season was the 1999 season of motorcycle speedway in Denmark.

== Individual ==
=== Individual Championship ===
The 1999 Danish Individual Speedway Championship was the 1999 edition of the Danish Individual Speedway Championship. The final was at Munkebo on 21 May. The title was won by Brian Andersen for the second time.

The Championship formed part of the 2000 Speedway Grand Prix Qualification with 5 riders qualifying for the Scandinavian Final.

Final

Pos.	Rider	Team	Total	Race off
1	Brian Andersen	Fjelsted	14	
2	Charlie Gjedde	Holstebro	13	
3	Brian Karger	Holsted	11	3
4	Ronni Pedersen	Slangerup	11	2
5	Bo Skov Eriksen	Herning	10	
6	Gert Handberg	Holstebro	9	
7	Hans Nielsen	Brovst	9	
8	Aksel Jepsen	Outrup	8	
9	John Jørgensen	Fjelsted	7	
10	Brian Lyngsö	Fjelsted	6	
11	Jacob Olsen	Slangerup	5	
12	Tom P. Knudsen	Outrup	5	
13	Jack Gundestrup	Brovst	3	
14	Bjarne Pedersen	Slangerup	2	
15	Allan Damgaard	Holstebro	2	
16	Jan Andersen	Outrup	2	

Key - Each heat has four riders, 3 points for a heat win, 2 for 2nd, 1 for third and 0 for last

=== Junior Championship ===
Mads Korneliussen won the Junior Championship.

== Team ==
=== Danish Superliga ===
The 1999 season was won by Outrup for the second time.

In 1999, a combined Fjelsted/Odense team competed in the Superliga and they managed to win the silver medal during a season beset with problems. The Fjelsted track closed mid-season, resulting in the combined team having to race their remaining fixtures at the Munkebo Speedway Center.

Pos	Team	P	W	2nd	3rd	4th	Pts
1	Outrup	14	9	2	2	1	33
2	Fjelsted/Odense	14	6	4	2	2	28
3	Brovst	14	4	6	3	1	27
4	Holstebro	14	5	3	4	2	25
5	Slangerup	14	3	3	5	3	20
6	Holsted	14	1	4	7	2	18
7	Herning	14	0	6	5	3	17
8	Vojens	14	0	0	0	14	0
