= Bent Rasmussen =

Danish speedway rider

- Born: 13 July 1957 (age 69); Herning, Denmark
- Nationality: Danish

Career history

Denmark
- 1977: Herning

Great Britain
- 1977–1978: Hackney Hawks
- 1978–1980: King's Lynn Stars
- 1981: Cradley Heathens

Individual honours
- 1980: Danish Championship bronze medal

Team honours
- 1981: British League winner
- 1980: Gauntlet Gold Cup
- 1980: Inter-League Knockout Cup

Bent Rasmussen (born 13 July 1957) is a former motorcycle speedway rider from Denmark. He earned three caps for the Denmark national speedway team.

== Career ==
Rasmussen made his British leagues debut in 1977, when he joined the Hackney Hawks for the 1977 British League season. The following season, he continued to ride for Hackney before switching to the King's Lynn Stars.

Rasmussen stayed with Hackney for the 1978 season and although his 1978 British league performances were below expectation he won the Danish Final (world championship round) held in Fjelsted.

Rasmussen continued to ride for King's Lynn in 1979 and 1980 and also represented the Denmark national speedway team at the 1979 Speedway World Team Cup. During the 1980 Danish speedway season he won the bronze medal in the Danish Championship.

Rasmussen's final season in Britain was in 1981, with the Cradley Heathens following a transfer in the region of £8,000 from King's Lynn. At Cradley, he rode in all 30 of Cradley's fixtures and helped them win the league championship.
