= Speedway World Pairs Championship =

Former motorcycle speedway event

World Pairs Championship
- Sport: Motorcycle speedway
- Founded: 1968
- Folded: 1993
- Replaced by: Speedway of Nations
- Continent: World
- Most titles: Hans Nielsen (7 times); Denmark (8 times)

The Speedway World Pairs Championship was a motorcycle speedway event held annually in different countries. The first competition was held in 1968, and the final competition was held in 1993. In 1994, it was merged with the World Team Cup to create the Speedway World Cup, which held its final edition in 2017.

The concept of an international pairs championship was re-established in the form of the Speedway of Nations, held for the first time in 2018.

== Rules ==
The final was competed between seven national teams, and two riders represented each national team. Each pairing rode against each other once. The pair with the highest combined score were declared the Champions. From 1991, a third rider could act as a reserve.

== Winners ==
Year	Venue	Winners	Runner-up	3rd place
1968	(West Germany) Kempten Speedway; Kempten	Sweden (24 pts); Ove Fundin; Torbjörn Harrysson	Great Britain (21 pts); Geoff Mudge; Ray Wilson	Norway (16 pts); Odd Fossengen; Øyvind S. Berg
1969	(Sweden) Gubbängens IP; Stockholm	New Zealand (28 pts); Ivan Mauger; Bob Andrews	Sweden (27 pts); Ove Fundin; Göte Nordin	England (21 pts); Nigel Boocock; Martin Ashby
1970	(Sweden) Malmö Stadion; Malmö	New Zealand (28 pts); Ivan Mauger; Ronnie Moore	Sweden (25 pts); Ove Fundin; Bengt Jansson	England (19 pts); Nigel Boocock; Eric Boocock
1971	(Poland) Rybnik Municipal Stadium; Rybnik	Poland (30 pts); Andrzej Wyglenda; Jerzy Szczakiel	New Zealand (25 pts); Ivan Mauger; Barry Briggs	Sweden (22 pts); Anders Michanek; Bernt Persson
1972	(Sweden) Ryavallen; Borås	England (24+3 pts); Ray Wilson; Terry Betts	New Zealand (24+2 pts); Ivan Mauger; Ronnie Moore	Sweden B (22+3 pts); Bernt Persson; Hasse Holmqvist
1973	(Sweden) Ryavallen; Borås	Sweden (24 pts); Anders Michanek; Tommy Jansson	Denmark (21+3 pts); Ole Olsen; Kurt Bøgh	Poland (21+2 pts); Zenon Plech; Zbigniew Marcinkowski
1974	(England) Hyde Road; Manchester	Sweden (28 pts); Anders Michanek; Sören Sjösten	Australia (23 pts); John Boulger; Phil Crump	New Zealand (21 pts); Barry Briggs; Ivan Mauger
1975	(Poland) Stadion Olimpijski; Wrocław	Sweden (24 pts); Anders Michanek; Tommy Jansson	Poland (23 pts); Edward Jancarz; Piotr Bruzda	Denmark (20+3 pts); Ole Olsen; Jan Henningsen
1976	(Sweden) Snälltorpet; Eskilstuna	England (27 pts); John Louis; Malcolm Simmons	Denmark (24 pts); Ole Olsen; Finn Thomsen	Sweden (22 pts); Bengt Jansson; Bernt Persson
1977	(England) Hyde Road; Manchester	England (28 pts); Peter Collins; Malcolm Simmons	Sweden (18 pts); Anders Michanek; Bernt Persson	West Germany (18 pts); Egon Müller; Hans Wassermann
1978	(Poland) Stadion Śląski; Chorzów	England (24+3 pts); Malcolm Simmons; Gordon Kennett	New Zealand (24+2 pts); Ivan Mauger; Larry Ross	Denmark (21 pts); Ole Olsen; Finn Thomsen
1979	(Denmark) Vojens Speedway Center; Vojens	Denmark (25 pts); Ole Olsen; Hans Nielsen	England (24 pts); Malcolm Simmons; Michael Lee	Poland (20 pts); Edward Jancarz; Zenon Plech
1980	(Socialist Federal Republic of Yugoslavia) Matija Gubec Stadium; Krško	England (29 pts); Dave Jessup; Peter Collins	Poland (22 pts); Edward Jancarz; Zenon Plech	Denmark (21 pts); Ole Olsen; Hans Nielsen
1981	(Poland) Stadion Śląski; Chorzów	United States (23 pts); Bruce Penhall; Bobby Schwartz	New Zealand (22 pts); Ivan Mauger; Larry Ross	Poland (21 pts); Zenon Plech; Edward Jancarz
1982	(Australia) Liverpool City Raceway; Sydney	United States (30 pts); Bobby Schwartz; Dennis Sigalos	England (22 pts); Kenny Carter; Peter Collins	Denmark (21 pts); Hans Nielsen; Ole Olsen
1983	(Sweden) Ullevi; Gothenburg	England (25 pts); Kenny Carter; Peter Collins	Australia (24 pts); Billy Sanders; Gary Guglielmi	Denmark (19 pts); Hans Nielsen; Erik Gundersen
1984	(Italy) Santa Marina Stadium; Lonigo	England (27 pts); Chris Morton; Peter Collins	Denmark (25+3 pts); Hans Nielsen; Erik Gundersen	New Zealand (25+2 pts); Ivan Mauger; Mitch Shirra
1985	(Poland) Rybnik Municipal Stadium; Rybnik	Denmark (29 pts); Erik Gundersen; Tommy Knudsen	England (27 pts); Kenny Carter; Kelvin Tatum	United States (22 pts); Bobby Schwartz; Shawn Moran
1986	(West Germany) Rottalstadion; Pocking	Denmark (46+5 pts); Hans Nielsen; Erik Gundersen	United States (46+4 pts); Kelly Moran; Sam Ermolenko	Czechoslovakia (32 pts); Antonín Kasper Jr. Roman Matoušek
1987	(Czechoslovakia) Svítkov Stadion; Pardubice	Denmark (52 pts); Erik Gundersen; Hans Nielsen	England (44 pts); Simon Wigg; Kelvin Tatum	United States (36 pts); Sam Ermolenko; Kelly Moran
1988	(England) Odsal Stadium; Bradford	Denmark (45 pts); Hans Nielsen; Erik Gundersen	England (41 pts); Kelvin Tatum; Simon Cross	United States (39 pts); Shawn Moran; Sam Ermolenko
1989	(Poland) Alfred Smoczyk Stadium; Leszno	Denmark (48 pts); Hans Nielsen; Erik Gundersen	Sweden (44 pts); Jimmy Nilsen; Per Jonsson	England (37 pts); Kelvin Tatum; Paul Thorp
1990	(Germany) Ellermühle Stadium; Landshut	Denmark (43 pts); Jan O. Pedersen; Hans Nielsen	Australia (41 pts); Todd Wiltshire; Leigh Adams	Hungary (33 pts); Zoltán Adorján; Sándor Tihanyi
1991	(Poland) Olimpia Poznań Stadium; Poznań	Denmark (28 pts); Hans Nielsen; Jan O. Pedersen; Tommy Knudsen	Sweden (24 pts); Henrik Gustafsson; Jimmy Nilsen; Per Jonsson	Norway (19 pts); Lars Gunnestad; Einar Kyllingstad; Tor Einar Hielm
1992	(Italy) Santa Marina Stadium; Lonigo	United States (23+3 pts); Greg Hancock; Sam Ermolenko; Ronnie Correy	England (23+2 pts); Gary Havelock; Kelvin Tatum; Martin Dugard	Sweden (22 pts); Per Jonsson; Henrik Gustafsson; Tony Rickardsson
1993	(Denmark) Vojens Speedway Center; Vojens	Sweden (26 pts); Tony Rickardsson; Per Jonsson; Henrik Gustafsson	United States (23 pts); Sam Ermolenko; Ronnie Correy; Greg Hancock	Denmark (21 pts); Hans Nielsen; Tommy Knudsen; Brian Karger

=== Medal classification ===
Pos	National Team	Total	Gold	Silver	Bronze
1.	Denmark	17	8	3	6
2.	Great Britain/England	17	7	7	3
3.	Sweden	14	5	5	4
4.	United States	8	3	2	3
5.	New Zealand	8	2	4	2
6.	Poland	6	1	2	3
7.	Australia	3	-	3	-
8.	Norway	2	-	-	2
=9.	Czechoslovakia	1	-	-	1
=9.	West Germany	1	-	-	1

Pos	Rider	Team	Total	Gold	Silver	Bronze
1.	Hans Nielsen	Denmark	11	7	1	3
2.	Erik Gundersen	Denmark	7	5	1	1
3.	Peter Collins	England	5	4	1	
4.	Anders Michanek	Sweden	5	3	1	1
5.	Malcolm Simmons	England	4	3	1	
6.	Ivan Mauger	New Zealand	8	2	4	2
7.	Tommy Jansson	Sweden	3	2	1	
8.	Bobby Schwartz	United States	3	2		1
9.	Jan O. Pedersen	Denmark	2	2		
10.	Ole Olsen	Denmark	7	1	2	4

== See also ==
- Motorcycle speedway
- Speedway of Nations, the current incarnation of the World Pairs Championship
