= Kurt Bøgh =

Danish speedway rider

- Born: c. 1945; Denmark
- Died: 20 August 2011
- Nationality: Danish

Career history

Denmark
- 1967: Esbjerg
- 1990: Holsted

Individual honours
- 1966, 1967, 1968, 1970, 1971, 1973, 1974: Danish Championships silver & bronze

Team honours
- 1977: World Pairs silver medal

Kurt Bøgh (circa.1943 – 20 August 2011) was an international speedway rider from Denmark. He was a member of the Denmark national speedway team.

== Speedway career ==
Bøgh won four silver medals and three bronze medals during the Danish Individual Speedway Championship in 1966, 1967, 1968, 1970, 1971, 1973 and 1974.

Bøgh won a silver medal during the Speedway World Pairs Championship in the 1973 Speedway World Pairs Championship.

Bøgh, together with his younger brother Ernst Bøgh, was instrumental in helping to form the Holsted Speedway Klub in 1974. The pair rode for the club in the Danish Speedway League.

Unlike the top Danes of the era, Bøgh did not ride in the British leagues despite an attempt by Oxford Cheetahs to sign him in 1968 as a replacement for broken leg victim Arne Pander.

== World Final appearances ==
=== World Pairs Championship ===
- 1973 - (Sweden) Borås (with Ole Olsen) - 2nd - 21pts

== Family ==
Bøgh's brother Ernst was also a speedway rider.
