= Danish Speedway League =

Danish speedway competition

- Sport: Motorcycle speedway
- Founded: 1967
- No. of teams: 7
- Country: Denmark
- Most recent champion: Slangerup
- Broadcaster: dk4
- Website: Official website

The Danish Speedway League (Danish: Dansk Speedway Liga) or Danish Super League or Metal League as it is called today is the top division of motorcycle speedway in Denmark.

In 1955, the idea of a Danish Tournament for teams surfaced. The Danish Speedway League began in 1956 for Frederiksborg (Hillerød), Amager, Odense and Randers.

== Roll of Honour ==
List of teams to have finished in medal-winning positions:

| Year | Champions | Runners-Up | Third | Ref |
|---|---|---|---|---|
Original tournament
| 1956 | Odense | Hillerød | Amager | |
| 1957 | Amager | Hillerød | Australia, Vejle | |
| 1958 | Amager | Randers | Odense | |
| 1959 | Amager | Randers | Odense | |
Division 1
| 1967 | Esbjerg | Fredericia | Herning | |
| 1968 | Fredericia | Løverne Haderslev | Hillerød | |
| 1969 | Esbjerg | Fredericia | Hillerød | |
| 1970 | Esbjerg | Fredericia | Cimbrerne Aalborg | |
| 1971 | Esbjerg | Fredericia | Løverne Haderslev | |
| 1972 | Esbjerg | Fredericia | Piraterne Århus | |
| 1973 | Piraterne Århus | Esbjerg | Fredericia | |
| 1974 | Fredericia | Esbjerg | Fredericia B | |
| 1975 | Fredericia | Esbjerg | Piraterne Århus | |
| 1976 | Holsted | Esbjerg | Piraterne Århus | |
| 1977 | Holsted | Esbjerg | Piraterne Århus | |
| 1978 | Holsted | Esbjerg | Ulvene, Midtsjaellands | |
| 1979 | Holsted | Slangerup | Esbjerg | |
| 1980 | Esbjerg | Holsted | Outrup | |
| 1981 | Esbjerg | Holsted | Frederikshavn | |
| 1982 | Fjelsted | Esbjerg | Outrup | |
| 1983 | Slangerup | Fjelsted | Esbjerg | |
| 1984 | Esbjerg | Fjelsted | Holsted | |
| 1985 | Outrup | Fjelsted | Holsted | |
Dansk Speedway Liga
| 1986 | Fjelsted | Fredericia | Slangerup | |
| 1987 | Fredericia | Fjelsted | Slangerup | |
| 1988 | Slangerup | Frederikshavn | Fjelsted | |
| 1989 | Fredericia | Fjelsted | Slangerup | |
| 1990 | Brovst | Fredericia | Saeby | |
| 1991 | Holsted | Fredericia | Holstebro | |
| 1992 | Fjelsted | Holsted | Fredericia | |
| 1993 | Fredericia | Fjelsted | Holsted | |
| 1994 | Holsted | Fredericia | Randers | |
| 1995 | Fjelsted | Holsted | Fredericia | |
| 1996 | Holsted | Fredericia | Holstebro | |
| 1997 | Holstebro | Holsted | Outrup | |
| 1998 | Brovst | Holstebro | Holsted | |
| 1999 | Outrup | Fjelsted/Odense | Brovst | |
| 2000 | Brovst | Herning | Holsted | |
| 2001 | Outrup | Holsted | Brovst | |
| 2002 | Holsted | Slangerup | Outrup | |
| 2003 | Holsted | Slangerup | Brovst | |
| 2004 | Holsted | Slangerup | Fredericia | |
| 2005 | Fredericia | Holsted | Slangerup | |
| 2006 | Holsted | Slangerup | Outrup | |
| 2007 | Holsted | Slangerup | Esbjerg | |
| 2008 | Slangerup | Esbjerg | Holsted | |
| 2009 | Holsted | Slangerup | Brovst | |
| 2010 | Slangerup | Outrup | Vojens | |
| 2011 | Slangerup | Holstebro | Holsted | |
| 2012 | Esbjerg | Fjelsted | Holsted | |
| 2013 | Esbjerg | Fjelsted | Holsted | |
| 2014 | Holsted | Esbjerg | Munkebo | |
| 2015 | Munkebo | Fjelsted | Esbjerg | |
| 2016 | Region Varde | Holsted | Esbjerg | |
| 2017 | Fjelsted | Region Varde | Slangerup | |
| 2018 | Region Varde | Slangerup | Holsted | |
| 2019 | Fjelsted | Esbjerg | Holsted | |
| 2020 | Not staged due to the Covid-19 pandemic. | | | |
| 2021 | Holsted | SES | Slangerup | |
Speedway Ligaen
| 2022 | SES | Slangerup | Holsted | |
| 2023 | Esbjerg | SES | Slangerup | |
| 2024 | Slangerup | Holsted | SES | |
| 2025 | Slangerup | SES | Holsted | |

== Medal table (champions only) ==
| Team | First | Second | Third |
|---|---|---|---|
| Holsted | 15 | 9 | 13 |
| Esbjerg | 11 | 10 | 5 |
| Fredericia | 7 | 10 | 5 |
| Slangerup | 7 | 9 | 7 |
| Fjelsted | 6 | 8 | 1 |
| Outrup | 3 | 1 | 5 |
| Brovst | 3 | 0 | 4 |
| Amager | 3 | 0 | 1 |
| Region Varde | 2 | 1 | 0 |
| Holstebro | 1 | 4 | 2 |
| SES | 1 | 3 | 1 |
| Piraterne Århus | 1 | 0 | 4 |
| Odense | 1 | 1 | 2 |
| Munkebo | 1 | 0 | 1 |

== See also ==
- Sports in Denmark
