= Denmark national speedway team =

Danish national motorcycle speedway team

Denmark
- Association: Danish Motor Union; Danmarks Motor Union
- FIM code: DMU
- Nation colour: White and Red
- SWC wins: 15 (1978, 1981, 1983, 1984, 1985, 1986, 1987, 1988, 1991, 1995, 1997, 2006, 2008, 2012, 2014)

The Denmark national speedway team are one of the major teams in international motorcycle speedway.

== History ==
It was not until the emergence of rider Ole Olsen that the Danish speedway team came to prominence. Previously the international scene had been largely dominated by Sweden, Poland and Great Britain. When he was joined in the team by Hans Nielsen, Denmark became a major contender for honours and won the 1978 Speedway World Team Cup in West Germany.

The team were the dominant force throughout the 1980s, winning seven World Cups, including a record six world titles in a row, between 1983 and 1988. Other key riders during the period were Erik Gundersen, Tommy Knudsen, Jan O. Pedersen and Finn Thomsen.

Further World Cup wins came in 1991, 1995, 1997, 2006, 2008, 2012 and 2014, with Nicki Pedersen and Niels Kristian Iversen each claiming four wins. Denmark have won the Speedway World Cup / Speedway World Team Cup a record 15 times, with Nielsen being a rider on 11 of those occasions. The team were managed by Hans Nielsen from 2016 to 2023.

Additionally, they won the defunct Speedway World Pairs Championship a record eight times.

== Major tournament wins ==
=== World Team Championships ===
Year	Venue	Standings (Pts)	Denmark Riders and Pts	
1978	(Germany); Landshut	1. Denmark (37); 2. England (27); 3. Poland (16); 4. (Czech Republic) Czechoslovakia (16)	Hans Nielsen	11
1978	(Germany); Landshut	1. Denmark (37); 2. England (27); 3. Poland (16); 4. (Czech Republic) Czechoslovakia (16)	Ole Olsen	10
1978	(Germany); Landshut	1. Denmark (37); 2. England (27); 3. Poland (16); 4. (Czech Republic) Czechoslovakia (16)	Mike Lohmann	9
1978	(Germany); Landshut	1. Denmark (37); 2. England (27); 3. Poland (16); 4. (Czech Republic) Czechoslovakia (16)	Finn Thomsen	7
1978	(Germany); Landshut	1. Denmark (37); 2. England (27); 3. Poland (16); 4. (Czech Republic) Czechoslovakia (16)	Kristian Praestbro	-
1981	(Germany); Olching	1. Denmark (36); 2. England (29); 3. West Germany (28); 4. Soviet Union (3)	Hans Nielsen	11
1981	(Germany); Olching	1. Denmark (36); 2. England (29); 3. West Germany (28); 4. Soviet Union (3)	Erik Gundersen	9
1981	(Germany); Olching	1. Denmark (36); 2. England (29); 3. West Germany (28); 4. Soviet Union (3)	Tommy Knudsen	9
1981	(Germany); Olching	1. Denmark (36); 2. England (29); 3. West Germany (28); 4. Soviet Union (3)	Ole Olsen	6
1981	(Germany); Olching	1. Denmark (36); 2. England (29); 3. West Germany (28); 4. Soviet Union (3)	Finn Thomsen	1
1983	(Denmark); Vojens	1. Denmark (37); 2. England (29); 3. (United States) USA (27); 4. (Czech Republic) Czechoslovakia (3)	Erik Gundersen	12
1983	(Denmark); Vojens	1. Denmark (37); 2. England (29); 3. (United States) USA (27); 4. (Czech Republic) Czechoslovakia (3)	Hans Nielsen	11
1983	(Denmark); Vojens	1. Denmark (37); 2. England (29); 3. (United States) USA (27); 4. (Czech Republic) Czechoslovakia (3)	Ole Olsen	7
1983	(Denmark); Vojens	1. Denmark (37); 2. England (29); 3. (United States) USA (27); 4. (Czech Republic) Czechoslovakia (3)	Peter Ravn	7
1983	(Denmark); Vojens	1. Denmark (37); 2. England (29); 3. (United States) USA (27); 4. (Czech Republic) Czechoslovakia (3)	Finn Thomsen	0
1984	(Poland); Leszno	1. Denmark (44); 2. England (24); 3. (United States) USA (20); 4. Poland (8)	Erik Gundersen	12
1984	(Poland); Leszno	1. Denmark (44); 2. England (24); 3. (United States) USA (20); 4. Poland (8)	Bo Petersen	12
1984	(Poland); Leszno	1. Denmark (44); 2. England (24); 3. (United States) USA (20); 4. Poland (8)	Hans Nielsen	11
1984	(Poland); Leszno	1. Denmark (44); 2. England (24); 3. (United States) USA (20); 4. Poland (8)	Preben Eriksen	9
1984	(Poland); Leszno	1. Denmark (44); 2. England (24); 3. (United States) USA (20); 4. Poland (8)	Peter Ravn	-
1985	(United States); Long Beach	1. Denmark (37); 2. (United States) USA (35); 3. England (13); 4. Sweden (10)	Tommy Knudsen	12
1985	(United States); Long Beach	1. Denmark (37); 2. (United States) USA (35); 3. England (13); 4. Sweden (10)	Erik Gundersen	10
1985	(United States); Long Beach	1. Denmark (37); 2. (United States) USA (35); 3. England (13); 4. Sweden (10)	Hans Nielsen	10
1985	(United States); Long Beach	1. Denmark (37); 2. (United States) USA (35); 3. England (13); 4. Sweden (10)	Preben Eriksen	5
1985	(United States); Long Beach	1. Denmark (37); 2. (United States) USA (35); 3. England (13); 4. Sweden (10)	Bo Petersen	0
1986	(Sweden); Gothenburg (Denmark); Vojens (England); Odsal	Best of three events 1. Denmark (9); 2. (United States) USA (4); 3. England (3); 4. Sweden (2)	Hans Nielsen	35
1986	(Sweden); Gothenburg (Denmark); Vojens (England); Odsal	Best of three events 1. Denmark (9); 2. (United States) USA (4); 3. England (3); 4. Sweden (2)	Erik Gundersen	33
1986	(Sweden); Gothenburg (Denmark); Vojens (England); Odsal	Best of three events 1. Denmark (9); 2. (United States) USA (4); 3. England (3); 4. Sweden (2)	Tommy Knudsen	33
1986	(Sweden); Gothenburg (Denmark); Vojens (England); Odsal	Best of three events 1. Denmark (9); 2. (United States) USA (4); 3. England (3); 4. Sweden (2)	Jan O. Pedersen	20
1986	(Sweden); Gothenburg (Denmark); Vojens (England); Odsal	Best of three events 1. Denmark (9); 2. (United States) USA (4); 3. England (3); 4. Sweden (2)	John Jørgensen	8
1987	(Denmark); Fredericia (England); Coventry (Czech Republic); Prague	Best of three events 1. Denmark (130); 2. England (101); 3. (United States) USA (93); 4. (Czech Republic) Czechoslovakia (36)	Hans Nielsen	38
1987	(Denmark); Fredericia (England); Coventry (Czech Republic); Prague	Best of three events 1. Denmark (130); 2. England (101); 3. (United States) USA (93); 4. (Czech Republic) Czechoslovakia (36)	Erik Gundersen	33
1987	(Denmark); Fredericia (England); Coventry (Czech Republic); Prague	Best of three events 1. Denmark (130); 2. England (101); 3. (United States) USA (93); 4. (Czech Republic) Czechoslovakia (36)	Jan O. Pedersen	32
1987	(Denmark); Fredericia (England); Coventry (Czech Republic); Prague	Best of three events 1. Denmark (130); 2. England (101); 3. (United States) USA (93); 4. (Czech Republic) Czechoslovakia (36)	Tommy Knudsen	27
1988	(United States); Long Beach	1. Denmark (44); 2. (United States) USA (32); 3. Sweden (22); 4. England (22)	Hans Nielsen	14
1988	(United States); Long Beach	1. Denmark (44); 2. (United States) USA (32); 3. Sweden (22); 4. England (22)	Jan O. Pedersen	12
1988	(United States); Long Beach	1. Denmark (44); 2. (United States) USA (32); 3. Sweden (22); 4. England (22)	Erik Gundersen	8
1988	(United States); Long Beach	1. Denmark (44); 2. (United States) USA (32); 3. Sweden (22); 4. England (22)	Tommy Knudsen	8
1988	(United States); Long Beach	1. Denmark (44); 2. (United States) USA (32); 3. Sweden (22); 4. England (22)	John Jørgensen	2
1991	(Denmark); Vojens	1. Denmark (51); 2. Sweden (30); 3. (United States) USA (28); 4. England (11)	Jan O. Pedersen	15
1991	(Denmark); Vojens	1. Denmark (51); 2. Sweden (30); 3. (United States) USA (28); 4. England (11)	Hans Nielsen	14
1991	(Denmark); Vojens	1. Denmark (51); 2. Sweden (30); 3. (United States) USA (28); 4. England (11)	Tommy Knudsen	13
1991	(Denmark); Vojens	1. Denmark (51); 2. Sweden (30); 3. (United States) USA (28); 4. England (11)	Gert Handberg	8
1991	(Denmark); Vojens	1. Denmark (51); 2. Sweden (30); 3. (United States) USA (28); 4. England (11)	Brian Karger	1
1995	(Poland); Bydgoszcz	1. Denmark (28); 2. England (22); 3. (United States) USA (19); 4. Sweden (19); 5. Australia (14); 6. Poland (13); 7. Norway (11)	Tommy Knudsen	15+3
1995	(Poland); Bydgoszcz	1. Denmark (28); 2. England (22); 3. (United States) USA (19); 4. Sweden (19); 5. Australia (14); 6. Poland (13); 7. Norway (11)	Hans Nielsen	13+2
1995	(Poland); Bydgoszcz	1. Denmark (28); 2. England (22); 3. (United States) USA (19); 4. Sweden (19); 5. Australia (14); 6. Poland (13); 7. Norway (11)	Brian Karger	0
1997	(Poland); Pila	1. Denmark (27); 2. Poland (25); 3. Sweden (21); 4. Germany (17); 5. Czech Republic (16); 6. Russia (10); 7. Hungary (9)	Hans Nielsen	14+3
1997	(Poland); Pila	1. Denmark (27); 2. Poland (25); 3. Sweden (21); 4. Germany (17); 5. Czech Republic (16); 6. Russia (10); 7. Hungary (9)	Tommy Knudsen	13+2
1997	(Poland); Pila	1. Denmark (27); 2. Poland (25); 3. Sweden (21); 4. Germany (17); 5. Czech Republic (16); 6. Russia (10); 7. Hungary (9)	Jesper B. Jensen	-
2006	(England); Reading	1. Denmark (45); 2. (United Kingdom) Great Britain (37); 3. Sweden (36); 4. Australia (35)	Nicki Pedersen	13
2006	(England); Reading	1. Denmark (45); 2. (United Kingdom) Great Britain (37); 3. Sweden (36); 4. Australia (35)	Hans Andersen	12
2006	(England); Reading	1. Denmark (45); 2. (United Kingdom) Great Britain (37); 3. Sweden (36); 4. Australia (35)	Bjarne Pedersen	9
2006	(England); Reading	1. Denmark (45); 2. (United Kingdom) Great Britain (37); 3. Sweden (36); 4. Australia (35)	Charlie Gjedde	6
2006	(England); Reading	1. Denmark (45); 2. (United Kingdom) Great Britain (37); 3. Sweden (36); 4. Australia (35)	Niels Kristian Iversen	5
2008	(Denmark); Vojens	1. Denmark (49); 2. Poland (37); 3. Sweden (39); 4. Australia (21)	Hans Andersen	11
2008	(Denmark); Vojens	1. Denmark (49); 2. Poland (37); 3. Sweden (39); 4. Australia (21)	Nicki Pedersen	11
2008	(Denmark); Vojens	1. Denmark (49); 2. Poland (37); 3. Sweden (39); 4. Australia (21)	Bjarne Pedersen	11
2008	(Denmark); Vojens	1. Denmark (49); 2. Poland (37); 3. Sweden (39); 4. Australia (21)	Kenneth Bjerre	9
2008	(Denmark); Vojens	1. Denmark (49); 2. Poland (37); 3. Sweden (39); 4. Australia (21)	Niels Kristian Iversen	7
2012	(Sweden); Målilla	1. Denmark (39); 2. Australia (36); 3. Russia(30); 4. Sweden (24)	Niels Kristian Iversen	11
2012	(Sweden); Målilla	1. Denmark (39); 2. Australia (36); 3. Russia(30); 4. Sweden (24)	Michael Jepsen Jensen	11
2012	(Sweden); Målilla	1. Denmark (39); 2. Australia (36); 3. Russia(30); 4. Sweden (24)	Nicki Pedersen	9
2012	(Sweden); Målilla	1. Denmark (39); 2. Australia (36); 3. Russia(30); 4. Sweden (24)	Mikkel B Jensen	8
2014	(Poland); Bydgoszcz	1. Denmark (38); 2. Poland (36); 3. Australia (36); 4. (United Kingdom) Great Britain (16)	Nicki Pedersen	17
2014	(Poland); Bydgoszcz	1. Denmark (38); 2. Poland (36); 3. Australia (36); 4. (United Kingdom) Great Britain (16)	Niels-Kristian Iversen	11
2014	(Poland); Bydgoszcz	1. Denmark (38); 2. Poland (36); 3. Australia (36); 4. (United Kingdom) Great Britain (16)	Peter Kildemand	7
2014	(Poland); Bydgoszcz	1. Denmark (38); 2. Poland (36); 3. Australia (36); 4. (United Kingdom) Great Britain (16)	Mads Korneliussen	3

=== World Pairs Championship ===
Year	Riders
1979	Ole Olsen & Hans Nielsen
1985	Erik Gundersen & Tommy Knudsen
1986	Hans Nielsen & Erik Gundersen
1987	Hans Nielsen & Erik Gundersen
1988	Hans Nielsen & Erik Gundersen
1989	Hans Nielsen & Erik Gundersen
1990	Hans Nielsen & Jan O. Pedersen
1991	Hans Nielsen, Jan O. Pedersen & Tommy Knudsen

=== European Pairs Championship ===
Year	Riders
2022	Rasmus Jensen, Michael Jepsen Jensen & Jonas Seifert-Salk

== International caps (as of 2022) ==
Since the advent of the Speedway Grand Prix era, international caps earned by riders is largely restricted to international competitions, whereas previously test matches between two teams were a regular occurrence. This means that the number of caps earned by a rider has decreased in the modern era.

Rider	Caps
Andersen, Brian	12
Andersen, Hans	22
Andersen, Jan	1
Andersen, Morten	1
Andreasen, Godtfred	2
Bech, Mikkel	2
Berlin, Leif	4
Berthelsen, Kiehn	13
Bjerre, Kenneth	17
Bøgh, Kurt	
Busk, Alf	8
Clausen, Hans	8
Ellegaard, Knud	1
Eriksen, Preben	41
Eskildsen, John	11
Gjedde, Charlie	11
Glanz, Peter	3
Gundersen, Erik	91
Handberg, Gert	20
Hansen, Kurt	1
Henningsen, Jan Rene	2
Hougaard, Patrick	1
Iversen, Niels Kristian	24
Jacobsen, Claus	3
Jensen, Bengt Norregaard	5
Jensen, Finn Rune	9
Jensen, Michael Jepsen	3
Johansen, Allan	5
Jørgensen, John	54
Juul, Richard	1
Karger, Brian	30
Kjaer, Jens Erik Krause	1
Klindt, Nicolai	5
Knudsen, Tommy	81
Korneliussen, Mads	2
Lohmann, Mike	17
Madsen, Leon	2
Madsen, Tom P.	1
Monberg, Jesper B.	7
Munkedal, Lars	4
Nielsen, Hans	118
Nielsen, Jens Henry	3
Nikolajsen, Sam	7
Noer, Kent	4
Olsen, Jacob	4
Olsen, Ole	50
Pander, Arne	16
Pedersen, Bjarne	29
Pedersen, Flemming	3
Pedersen, Jan Henrik	3
Pedersen, Jan O.	42
Pedersen, Nicki	30
Pedersen, Ronni	6
Petersen, Bo	59
Petersen, Kurt W.	5
Præstbro, Kristian	6
Rasmussen, Bent	3
Rasmussen, Jens	17
Ravn, Peter	42
Risager, Morten	1
Rosenkilde, Preben	1
Sørensen, Per	3
Stæchmann, Jan	13
Thomsen, Finn	30
Vinther, Martin	1
Weiss, Neils	2
