= Jan Henningsen =

Danish speedway rider

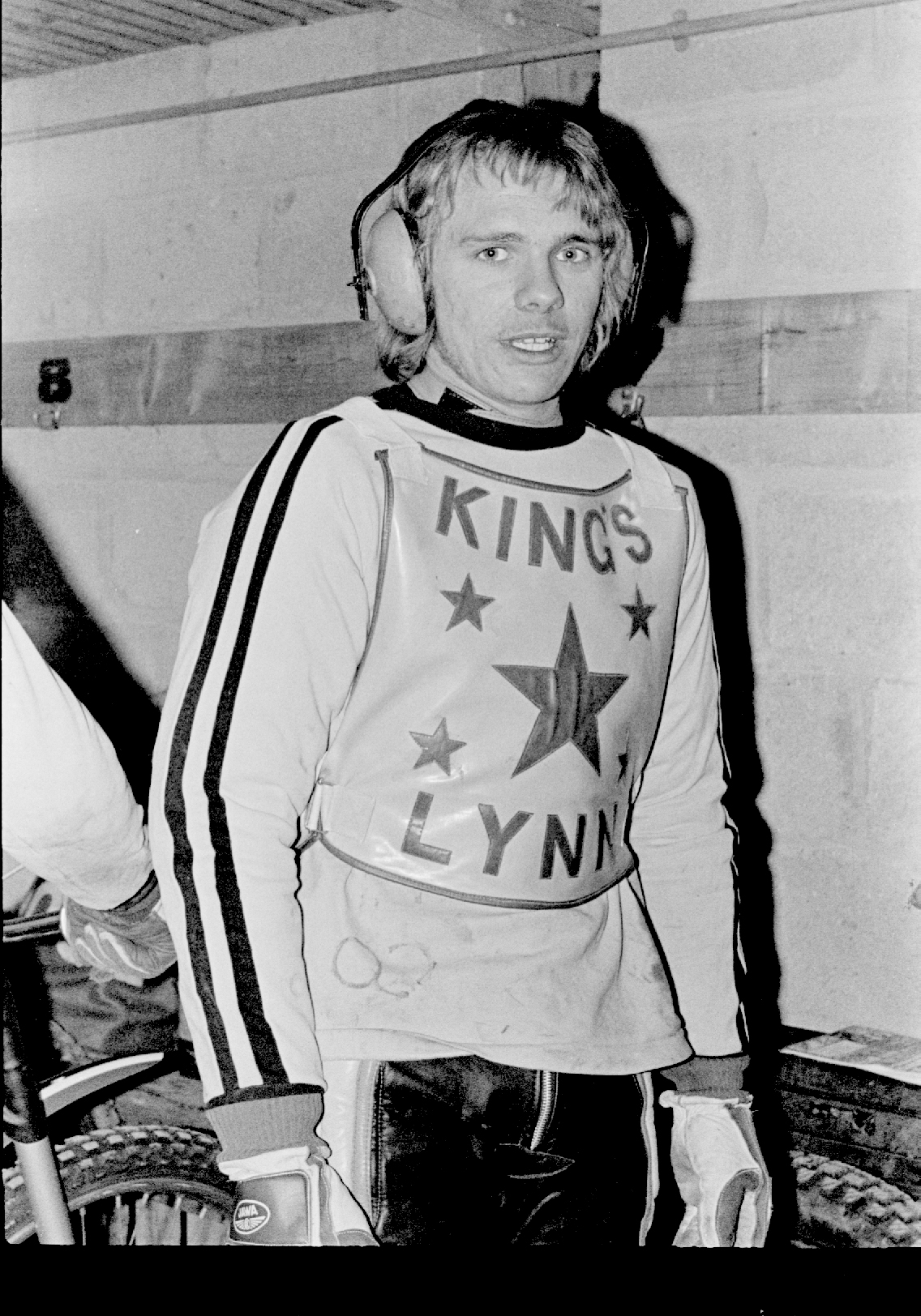
- Born: 2 March 1954 (age 72); Esbjerg, Denmark
- Nationality: Danish

Career history
- 1975-1976: King's Lynn Stars

Team honours
- 1975: World Pairs bronze medal

Jan Rene Henningsen (born 2 March 1954) is a former international speedway rider from Denmark. He earned two caps for the Denmark national speedway team.

== Speedway career ==
Henningsen won a bronze medal in the final of the Speedway World Pairs Championship in the 1975 Speedway World Pairs Championship.

Henningsen rode in the top tier of British Speedway from 1975 to 1976, after signing for King's Lynn Stars despite Coventry Bees initially trying to capture his signature.

== World Final appearances ==
=== World Pairs Championship ===
- 1975 - (Poland) Wrocław, Olympic Stadium (with Ole Olsen) - 3rd - 20pts (18)
