= Finn Jensen (speedway rider) =

Danish speedway rider

- Born: 9 January 1957 (age 69); Haderslev, Denmark
- Nationality: Danish

Career history

Denmark
- 1975–1976: Haderslev
- 1984–1987: Vojens

Great Britain
- 1977–1981: Birmingham Brummies
- 1981–1983: Leicester Lions
- 1983: Reading Racers
- 1984–1985: Cradley Heathens

Individual honours
- 1975: Danish Under-21 Champion
- 1978: European Junior Champion

Team honours
- 1984: League Cup Winner
- 1984: Midland Cup Winner

Finn Rune Jensen (born 9 January 1957) is a former motorcycle speedway rider from Denmark. He earned nine international caps for the Denmark national speedway team.

== Biography ==
Born in Haderslev, Denmark, Jensen started his speedway career at Ole Olsen's training school at Stoke in 1974. He joined the Haderslev Motorsport Club (Hvepserne) on his return to Denmark and finished in tenth place in the 1974 Danish Junior Championship. The following year, only his second in speedway, he won the championship, scoring 15 points.

Jensen was taken on by the Birmingham Brummies in 1977, where he spent four years, also winning the European Junior Championship at the Santa Marina Stadium in Lonigo during 1978. He represented Denmark several times in international matches. In 1981, he moved to Leicester Lions, scoring eight points on his debut. He was a regular member of the Lions team until a poor spell in 1983 saw him loaned to Reading Racers. His form picked up and he returned for the end of the season, but with the demise of the Lions at the end of 1983, he moved on to Cradley Heathens in 1984. After two seasons with the Heathens, he retired from speedway.

In 1987, Jensen started a small business for repairing and maintaining motorcycles.
