= Erik Gundersen =

Danish speedway rider

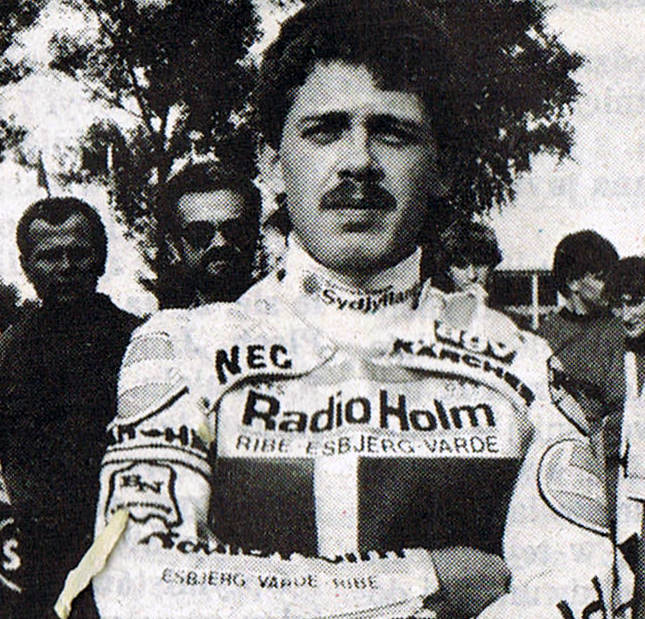
- Born: 8 October 1959 (age 67); Esbjerg, Denmark
- Nationality: Danish

Career history

Denmark
- 1979–1989: Esbjerg

Great Britain
- 1979–1989: Cradley Heathens

Sweden
- 1987–1989: Vargarna

Individual honours
- 1984, 1985, 1988: World Speedway Champion
- 1984, 1986: Long Track World Champion
- 1983, 1985: British League Riders Speedway Champion
- 1983, 1984, 1985, 1986, 1989: Danish Speedway Champion
- 1983, 1985, 1986: Danish Under-21 Speedway Champion
- 1985, 1986: Denmark Longtrack Champion
- 1985, 1986: Golden Helmet of Pardubice
- 1986, 1987: Intercontinental Speedway Champion
- 1987: Nordic Speedway Champion
- 1981, 1982, 1986: Danish Gold Bar
- 1981, 1982, 1983: Midland Riders Champion
- 1982, 1986: Golden Gala Italy
- 1986, 1987: Golden Hammer
- 1983: Blue Riband
- 1983: Second City Trophy

Team honours
- 1981, 1983, 1984, 1985, 1986, 1987, 1988: World Team Cup winner
- 1985, 1986, 1987, 1988, 1989: World Pairs Champion
- 1981, 1983: British League Champion
- 1979, 1980, 1982, 1983, 1986 (shared), 1987, 1988, 1989: British League KO Cup Winner
- 1982, 1984, 1986 (shared): British League Cup
- 1980, 1983, 1984, 1987: Midland Cup

Competition record

Representing Denmark

Speedway World Championship
Gold medal – first place	1984	
Gold medal – first place	1985	
Gold medal – first place	1988	
Silver medal – second place	1987	

Speedway World Team Cup
Gold medal – first place	1981	
Gold medal – first place	1983	
Gold medal – first place	1984	
Gold medal – first place	1985	
Gold medal – first place	1986	
Gold medal – first place	1987	
Gold medal – first place	1988	
Silver medal – second place	1979	
Silver medal – second place	1982	
Silver medal – second place	1989	

Speedway World Pairs Championship
Gold medal – first place	1985	
Gold medal – first place	1986	
Gold medal – first place	1987	
Gold medal – first place	1988	
Gold medal – first place	1989	
Silver medal – second place	1984	
Bronze medal – third place	1982	
Bronze medal – third place	1983	

Intercontinental Championship
Gold medal – first place	1986	
Gold medal – first place	1987	
Silver medal – second place	1981	
Silver medal – second place	1989	
Bronze medal – third place	1988	

Golden Helmet
Gold medal – first place	1985	
Gold medal – first place	1986	
Bronze medal – third place	1995	

Long Track World Championship
Gold medal – first place	1984	
Gold medal – first place	1986	

Erik Gundersen (born 8 October 1959 in Esbjerg, Denmark) is a former motorcycle speedway rider. Gundersen is one of the most successful speedway riders of all time, having won the Speedway World Champion on three occasions, the Long Track World Championship twice and the World Pairs Championship five times. He is also a seven-time World Team Cup winner with Denmark, and earned 91 international caps for the country.

Gundersen won the World Pairs Championship a record five years in succession from 1985 to 1989, and won the World Team Cup a record six years in succession from 1983 to 1988. His 17 World Championship wins see him sit second for the most World Championships won behind fellow Dane and Gundersen's long time Danish teammate and rival Hans Nielsen.

== Career ==
=== 1979 ===
Gundersen rode for his home town club Esbjerg and joined the British leagues with Cradley Heath Heathens during the 1979 British League season. He also rode in the qualifying rounds of the 1979 Speedway World Team Cup and gained a silver medal despite not actually riding in the final.

=== 1980 ===
Gundersen enjoyed a solid season for Cradley Heath and helped them win the Knockout Cup. In addition he rode for Denmark in his second World Cup.

=== 1981 ===
Gundersen first appeared in the Speedway World Championship Final in 1981 at Wembley Stadium where in front of 92,500 fans he finished fourth with 11 points. On the night he set a new four lap record for the 345 metres (377 yards) track of 66.8 seconds, a record that will stand forever as this was the last time that speedway was raced at the famous venue. He also won the World Cup with Denmark for the first time and was a league champion with Cradley.

=== 1982 ===
Gundersen's 1982 title chase ended on a sour note when he failed to qualify for the final held at the Los Angeles Memorial Coliseum after finishing a surprising 16th and last in the 1982 Intercontinental Final in Sweden. However, the year resulted in two medals, a silver in the World Cup and a bronze in the Speedway World Pairs Championship, (appearing in the semi final). Additionally, he won two cup competitions with Cradley.

=== 1983 ===
Gundersen made amends for his 1982 failure, easily qualifying for the 1983 World Final in West Germany where he would again finish in a strong fourth place. He won the British League Riders' Championship, held at Hyde Road on 15 October 1983. He won a second World Cup gold medal with Denmark and a bronze in the World pairs, partnering Hans Nielsen. In Britain, he won the league and cup double with Cradley and topped the Midlands' team averages.

=== 1984 ===
1984 was a hugely successful year for Gundersen; he went on to win the 1984 Individual Speedway World Championship at Ullevi in Gothenburg and became the World champion for the first time. He also won another World Cup with Denmark, the Individual Speedway Long Track World Championship and a silver medal in the World Pairs.

=== 1985 ===
Gundersen defended his World title, winning the 1985 Individual Speedway World Championship at the Odsal Stadium in Bradford. He achieved the treble of World titles by winning the World Cup and World Pairs again. He also won the British League Riders' Championship for the second time.

=== 1986 ===
Despite a tenth place finish (engine failure during the heats ended his chances of winning) at the 1986 World Final, Gundersen won a fifth World Cup gold medal in a Denmark team that dominated world speedway at the time. He also won the World pairs with Hans Nielsen and a second Long Track World Championship.

=== 1987 ===
Gundersen was pipped by great rival Nielsen in the two-day 1987 World Final at the Amsterdam Olympic Stadium. He once again made amends by winning the World Pairs (with Nielsen) and a sixth World Cup. Domestically, he won another Knockout Cup with Cradley and was already regarded as one of their greatest ever riders.

=== 1988 ===
At a packed to capacity Vojens Speedway Center in what was the first ever World Individual Final held in his home country of Denmark, Gundersen claimed his third World Championship in the 1988. He won his fourth consecutive World pairs and a seventh World Cup gold medal.

=== 1989 ===
1989 started much as usual, he would win the World Pairs again and suffered an engine failure during the final of the 1989 at the Munich Olympic Stadium in West Germany, which ended any chances of a fourth World crown.

Gundersen's career was ended just a few weeks after the 1989 World Final when he was involved in an accident whilst riding for Denmark at the Odsal Stadium on the 17 September 1989, in the World Team Cup final. Starting from the outside in Gate 4, he won the start but his motorcycle locked up on the first bend and he was knocked off by the rider behind. As he lay on the race track he was hit in the head by another rider's rear wheel. After the accident he was not expected to live and he remained in a coma for three days, but he eventually regained consciousness. He was then confined to a bed in hospital for the next month with grim prospects for resuming a normal life as doctors reported he had no neurological function below his neck.

== After racing ==
Gundersen defied the experts though and was determined to walk again. He had to learn to walk again and raised a large amount of money for the hospital which saved his life. He later went on to manage the Danish national speedway team.

During his career, Gundersen never finished off of the podium in the final of either the Speedway World Team Cup or the Speedway World Pairs Championship, though he was unable to take the podium of the 1989 World Team Cup in which Denmark finished in second place.

== World final appearances ==
World Championship Final results timeline
Year	1979	1980	1981	1982	1983	1984	1985	1986	1987	1988	1989
Finishing position	-	-	4	-	4	1	1	10	2	1	4

=== Individual World Championship ===
- 1981 - (England) London, Wembley Stadium - 4th - 11pts
- 1983 - (West Germany) Norden, Motodrom Halbemond - 4th - 10pts
- 1984 - (Sweden) Gothenburg, Ullevi - Winner - 14pts
- 1985 - (England) Bradford, Odsal Stadium - Winner - 13pts + 3pts
- 1986 - (Poland) Chorzów, Silesian Stadium - 10th - 7pts
- 1987 - (Netherlands) Amsterdam, Olympic Stadium - 2nd - 24pts + 3pts
- 1988 - (Denmark) Vojens, Speedway Center - Winner - 14pts + 3pts
- 1989 - (West Germany) Munich, Olympic Stadium - 4th - 11pts

=== World Pairs Championship ===
- 1983 - (Sweden) Gothenburg, Ullevi (with Hans Nielsen) - 3rd - 19pts (8)
- 1984 - (Italy) Lonigo, Pista Speedway (with Hans Nielsen) - 2nd - 25pts (10)
- 1985 - (Poland) Rybnik, Rybnik Municipal Stadium (with Tommy Knudsen) - Winner - 29pts (16)
- 1986 - (West Germany) Pocking, Rottalstadion (with Hans Nielsen) - Winner - 46+5pts (19)
- 1987 - (Czechoslovakia) Pardubice, Svítkov Stadion (with Hans Nielsen) - Winner - 52pts (26)
- 1988 - (England) Bradford, Odsal Stadium (with Hans Nielsen) - Winner - 45pts (18)
- 1989 - (Poland) Leszno, Alfred Smoczyk Stadium (with Hans Nielsen) - Winner - 48pts (20)

=== World Team Cup ===
- 1981 - (West Germany) Olching, Olching Speedwaybahn (with Ole Olsen / Hans Nielsen / Tommy Knudsen / Finn Thomsen) - Winner - 36pts (9)
- 1982 - (England) London, White City Stadium (with Ole Olsen / Hans Nielsen / Preben Eriksen / Tommy Knudsen) - 2nd - 27pts (7)
- 1983 - (Denmark) Vojens, Speedway Center (with Ole Olsen / Hans Nielsen / Finn Thomsen / Peter Ravn) - Winner - 37pts (12)
- 1984 - (Poland) Leszno, Alfred Smoczyk Stadium (with Bo Petersen / Preben Eriksen / Hans Nielsen) - Winner - 44pts (12)
- 1985 - (United States) Long Beach, Veterans Memorial Stadium (with Bo Petersen / Tommy Knudsen / Hans Nielsen / Preben Eriksen) - Winner - 37pts (10)
- 1986 - (Sweden) Gothenburg, Ullevi, (Denmark) Vojens, Speedway Center and (England) Bradford, Odsal Stadium (with Hans Nielsen / Tommy Knudsen / Jan O. Pedersen / John Jørgensen) - Winner - 129pts (33)
- 1987 - (Denmark) Fredericia, Fredericia Speedway, (England) Coventry, Brandon Stadium and (Czechoslovakia) Prague, Marketa Stadium (with Hans Nielsen / Jan O. Pedersen / Tommy Knudsen) - Winner - 130pts (33)
- 1988 - (United States) Long Beach, Veterans Memorial Stadium (with Hans Nielsen / Tommy Knudsen / Jan O. Pedersen / John Jørgensen) - Winner - 44pts (6)
- 1989* - (England) Bradford, Odsal Stadium - (with Hans Nielsen / Gert Handberg / John Jørgensen / Brian Karger) - 2nd - 34pts (0)

* The 1989 Speedway World Team Cup final was where Gundersen suffered his career ending crash in turn 1 of Heat 1.

=== Individual Under-21 World Championship ===
- 1978 - (Italy) Lonigo, Pista Speedway - 6th - 11pts
- 1980 - (West Germany) Pocking, Rottalstadion - 4th - 11+2pts

== World Longtrack Championship ==
=== One Day Finals ===
- 1984 (Germany) Herxheim - Winner - 23pts
- 1985 (Denmark) Esbjerg (N/S)
- 1986 (Germany) Pfarrkirchen - Winner - 25pts
- 1987 (Germany) Mühldorf - (7th) - 10pts
