= Bo Petersen =

Danish speedway rider

- Born: 21 February 1958 (age 68); Bolbro, Denmark
- Nationality: Danish

Career history

Denmark
- 1977–1989: Fjelsted
- 1990–1991: Saeby

Great Britain
- 1978–1983: Hackney Hawks
- 1984–1985: Swindon Robins
- 1988: King's Lynn Stars
- 1990: Wolverhampton Wolves
- 1991–1993: Arena Essex Hammers

Sweden
- 1991: Vetlanda
- 1992: Indianerna

Individual honours
- 1980: Danish Champion
- 1979: Littlechild Trophy
- 1983: London Riders' Championship

Team honours
- 1984, 1985: World Cup Winner
- 1991: British League Div Two Champion
- 1991: British League Div Two KO Cup Winner
- 1991: British League Div Two Fours Champion

Bo Petersen (born 21 February 1958 Bolbro, Denmark) is a former motorcycle speedway rider from Denmark. He was the 1980 Danish champion and earned 59 caps for the Denmark national speedway team.

== Career ==
Petersen first rode in the United Kingdom with the Hackney Hawks for the 1978 British League season. Signed by Len Silver in 1978, he stayed with the Hackney until they closed at the end of the season 1983.

In 1984, Petersen signed for the Swindon Robins. He then had spells with King's Lynn Stars and Wolverhampton Wolves in the top flight of the British League, before joining long-time sponsor Ivan Henry's new club Arena Essex Hammers in 1991. Henry had combined with Terry Russell to take over the Hammers from former promoter Chick Woodroffe. Competing in the British League Division Two, Petersen topped the league averages and led Arena to the League Championship, Knockout Cup and Fours Team Championship. The Hammers gained promotion to the British League Division One in 1992. Petersen achieved a calculated match average of over eight points per meeting in the top flight, but announced his retirement at the end of that season.

During 1993, a serious head injury to Peter Ravn led to Petersen returning to the Hammers to cover his fellow Dane's absence. The Hammers finished fourth in the League and finished runners-up in a controversial Knockout Cup final. Petersen, disgusted by off-track incidents, threw his runners-up medal into the crowd at the end of the meeting.. He announced his retirement at the end of the season despite finishing the season calculated match average of over eight points per meeting.

Petersen made one further appearance on a bike at Arena Essex when he rode for a Hammers Dream Team in the Andy Galvin Benefit Meeting in March 1995.

Petersen was a Speedway World Team Cup winner with the Danish speedway team in 1984 and 1985.

== World Final Appearances ==
=== Individual World Championship ===
- 1984 - (Sweden) Gothenburg, Ullevi - 7th - 9pts

=== World Team Cup ===
- 1979 - (England) London, White City Stadium (with Ole Olsen / Hans Nielsen / Mike Lohmann / Finn Thomsen) - 2nd - 31pts (0)
- 1984 - (Poland) Leszno, Alfred Smoczyk Stadium (with Erik Gundersen / Preben Eriksen / Hans Nielsen) - Winner - 44pts (12)
- 1985 - (United States) Long Beach, Veterans Memorial Stadium (with Tommy Knudsen / Erik Gundersen / Hans Nielsen / Preben Eriksen) - Winner - 37pts (0)
