= Esbjerg Speedway Klub =

Danish speedway team

Esbjerg Vikings

Club information
- Track address: Granly Speedway Arena; Tinghedevej 9, 6715 Esbjerg Kommune
- Country: Denmark
- Founded: 1929 (as Esbjerg Automobile and Motorcycle Club)
- League: Danish Super League
- Website: Official Website

Major team honours
| Team champions | 1967, 1969, 1970, 1971, 1972, 1980, 1981, 1984, 2012, 2013, 2023 |

Esbjerg Speedway Klub or Esbjerg Vikings (part of Esbjerg Motosport) is a speedway club from Esbjerg in Denmark, who compete in the Danish Speedway League. The team have won the Danish Speedway League title on 11 occasions in 1967, 1969, 1970, 1971, 1972, 1980, 1981, 1984, 2012, 2013 and 2023.

== Track ==
The club's home venue is the Granly Speedway Arena, which is located about 16 kilometres in a easterly direction from the centre of Esbjerg, on Tinghedevej 9.

== History ==
=== 1929 to 1966 ===
Esbjerg Motorsport was founded in 1929 as the Esbjerg Automobile and Motorcycle Club. After World War II the club acquired moorland and built a track called the Korskro Motor Center, which opened on 7 July 1946.

Following financial issues and increased stadium safety costs during 1950, the club were forced to find a cheaper option and moved to the Esbjerg Idrætspark, which contained the new Esbjerg Atletikstadion and the Esbjerg Stadium. The site held several important speedway meetings such as the 1960, 1996 and 1968 Danish Individual Speedway Championships. Esbjerg Motor Sport joined the Danish Automobile Sports Union (DASU) in 1963.

=== 1967 to 1985 ===
In 1967, a new organised tournament was formed with seven teams being registered. One of the teams was the called Vikingerne (the Vikings) formed by the Esbjerg club and this resulted in instant success as they won the 1967 Danish tournament. The team consisted of Finn Rasmussen, Bent Nørregaard-Jensen, Preben Bollerup, Kaj O. Jensen, Finn Schelde, Kurt Bøgh and team captain Poul Wissing.

The Vikings left the Athletic Stadium and returned to the Korskro Motor Center (which has undergone an expansion in 1955) and then achieved four consecutive league titles in 1969, 1970, 1971 and 1972. The team enjoyed a large following and attendance receipts helped them become profitable, erasing the memories of the 1950s financial troubles. However, the Korskro track did not meet international specifications, so it was totally rebuilt and renamed the Esbjerg Motor Center, which opened on 1 May 1971. It also contained a longtrack, which became one of the sport's primary venues and held the 1982 and 1985 Individual Speedway Long Track World Championships.

The Vikings domination of Danish speedway continued, with the team winning three more Danish championships in 1980, 1981 and 1984.

=== 1986 to 1990 ===
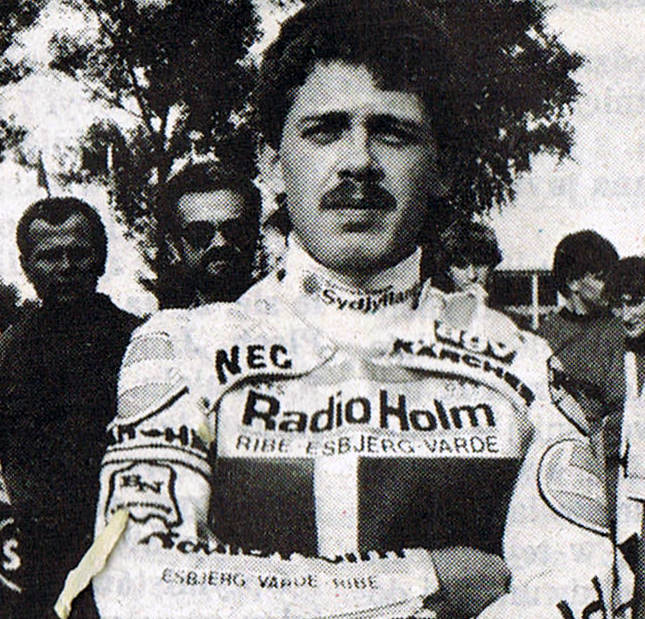
Erik Gundersen

In 1986, the professional Danish Speedway League or Superliga was created, of which Esbjerg were a founder member. The Vikings were able to call upon the world champion Erik Gundersen for the new era. Despite having one of the world's best riders the team struggled to make an impact and when they finished last in 1990 they dropped out of the top tier.

=== 2007 to present ===
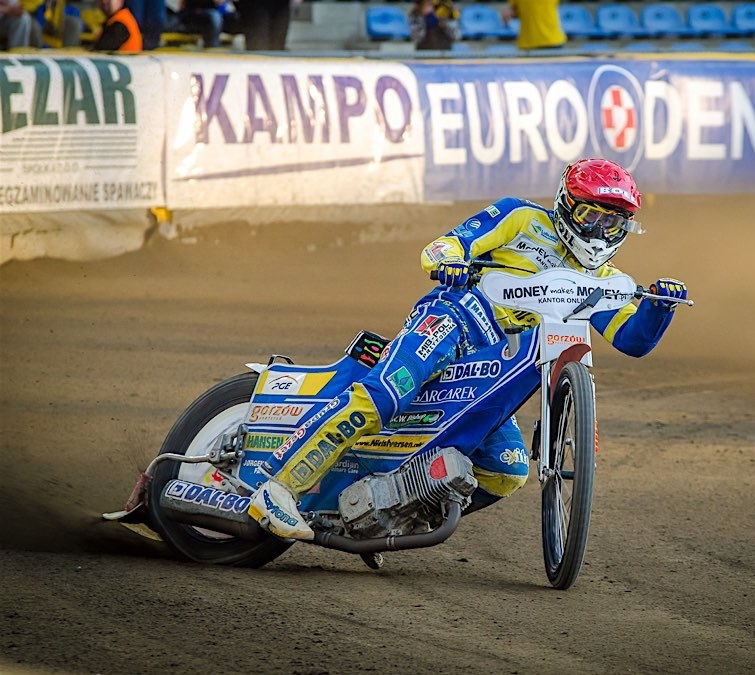
Niels Kristian Iversen, rider from 2012 to 2023

The Vikings returned to the top tier 17 years later for the 2007 Danish speedway season. They finished runner-up in 2008 and then won their 10th and 11th league titles in 2012 and 2013. The team of the period included riders such as Niels Kristian Iversen, Artem Laguta, Patryk Dudek, Kenneth Bjerre, Mads Korneliussen, Leon Madsen and Mikkel Bech. In 2014, the track was renamed the Granly Speedway Arena. The team have since competed every season in the Super League.

In 2022, the club signed three times world champion Tai Woffinden. The following season in 2023, the Vikings won their 11th league title after finishing second in the league standings but winning the Super Final.

== Riders ==
=== Notable riders ===
- (Denmark) Mikkel Bech
- (Denmark) Kenneth Bjerre
- (Denmark) Kurt Bøgh
- (Poland) Patryk Dudek
- (Denmark) Erik Gundersen
- (Denmark) Niels Kristian Iversen
- (Denmark) Mads Korneliussen
- (Russia) Artem Laguta
- (Denmark) Leon Madsen
- (Denmark) Bent Nørregaard-Jensen
