= Finn Thomsen =

Danish speedway rider

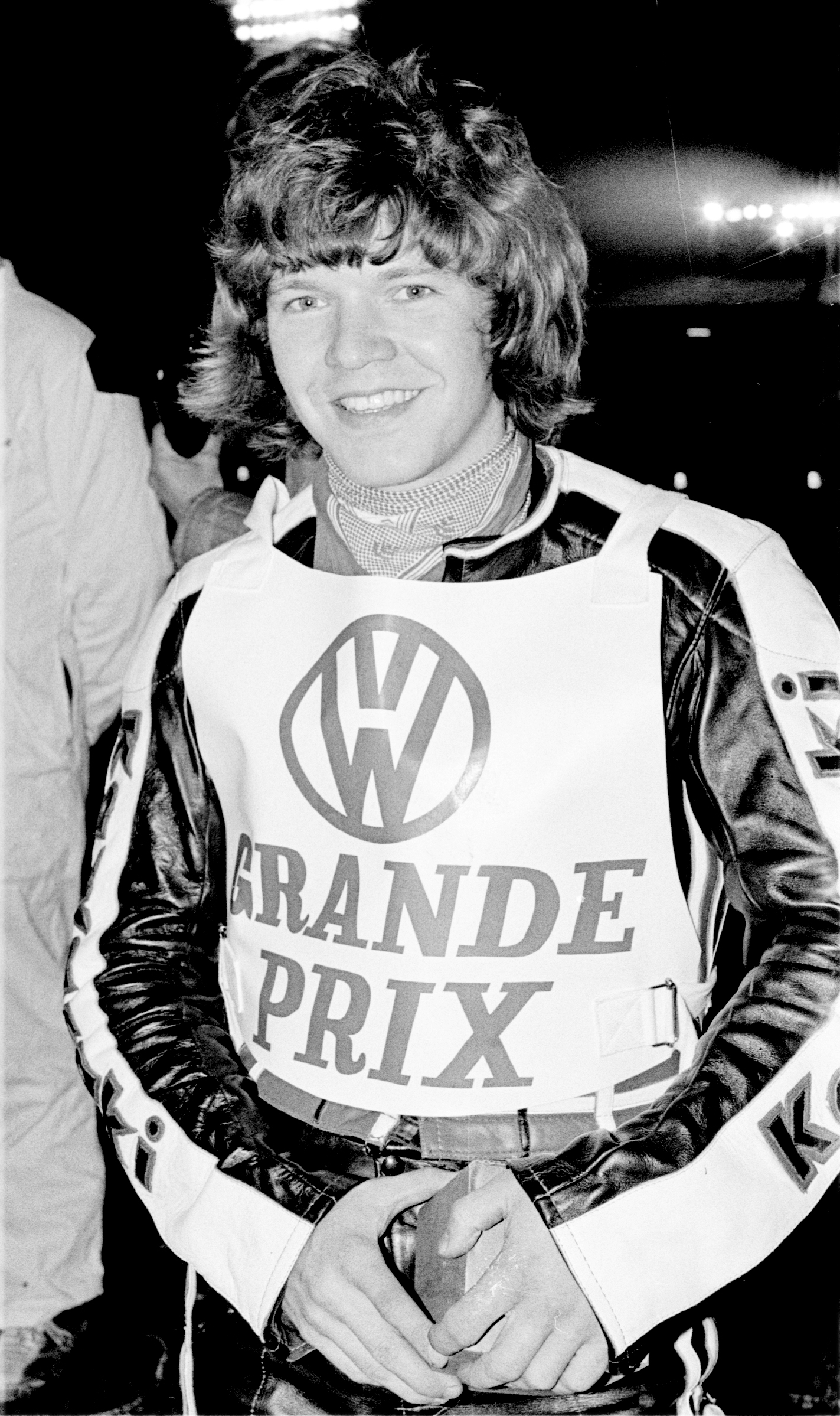
- Born: 16 February 1955 (age 71); Arhus, Denmark
- Nationality: Danish

Career history

Denmark
- 1973-1974: Piraterne Århus

Great Britain
- 1974-1977: Wolverhampton Wolves
- 1978-1983: Hackney Hawks
- 1984: Poole Pirates
- 1986: Swindon Robins

Individual honours
- 1973: Danish Under-21 Champion
- 1976, 1977: Danish Final
- 1980: London Riders' Champion
- 1977: Manpower Trophy
- 1983: Vic Harding Memorial Trophy

Team honours
- 1978, 1981, 1983: World Team Cup Winner

Competition record

Representing Denmark

Speedway World Team Cup
Gold medal – first place	1978	
Gold medal – first place	1981	
Gold medal – first place	1983	
Silver medal – second place	1979	

Speedway World Pairs Championship
Silver medal – second place	1976	
Bronze medal – third place	1978	

Intercontinental Championship
Bronze medal – third place	1979	

Finn Thomsen (born 16 February 1955) is a former motorcycle speedway rider from Denmark. He earned 30 caps for the Denmark national speedway team.

== Career ==
Thomsen was a Speedway World Team Cup winner with the Denmark national speedway team in 1978, 1981 and 1983.

Thomsen first rode in the United Kingdom with the Wolverhampton Wolves during the 1974 British League season where he spent four years steadily improving his average.

In 1978, Thomsen was signed by Len Silver for the Hackney Hawks in a swap deal with Dave Morton, later becoming team captain in 1980. When Hackney closed at the end of the 1983 season, he moved to Poole Pirates for the 1984 season and rode for Swindon Robins in 1986.

== World Final Appearances ==
=== Individual World Championship ===
- 1977 - (Sweden) Gothenburg, Ullevi - 5th - 10pts
- 1979 - (Poland) Chorzów, Silesian Stadium - 10th - 6pts
- 1980 - (Sweden) Göteborg, Ullevi - 10th - 7pts

=== World Pairs Championship ===
- 1976 - (Sweden) Eskilstuna, Eskilstuna Motorstadion (with Ole Olsen) - 2nd - 24pts (8)
- 1978 - (Poland) Chorzów, Silesian Stadium (with Ole Olsen) - 3rd - 21pts (5)

=== World Team Cup ===
- 1978 - (West Germany) Landshut, Stadion Ellermühle (with Ole Olsen / Mike Lohmann / Hans Nielsen) - Winner - 37pts (7)
- 1979 - (England) London, White City Stadium (with Ole Olsen / Hans Nielsen / Mike Lohmann / Bo Petersen) - 2nd - 31pts (4)
- 1981 - (West Germany) Olching, Olching Speedwaybahn (with Ole Olsen / Hans Nielsen / Erik Gundersen / Tommy Knudsen) - Winner - 36pts (1)
- 1983 - (Denmark) Vojens, Speedway Center (with Ole Olsen / Hans Nielsen / Erik Gundersen / Peter Ravn) - Winner - 35pts (0)
