= Godtfred Andreasen =

Danish speedway rider

- Born: 10 May 1946 (age 80); Horsens, Denmark
- Nationality: Danish

Career history
- 1968: Oxford Cheetahs

Individual honours
- 1966: Danish Champion

Godtfred Andreasen also spelt Andreasson (born 10 May 1946) is a former international speedway rider from Denmark. He earned two caps for the Denmark national speedway team.

== Speedway career ==
Andreasen was a champion of Denmark, winning the Danish Championship in 1966.

After a successful 1968 Individual Speedway World Championship campaign, where he qualified for the British and Nordic final Andreasen was signed by Oxford Cheetahs to ride in the top tier of British Speedway for the 1968 British League season.
