= Odense Speedway =

Speedway club in Odense, Denmark

Club information
- Track address: Odense
- Country: Denmark

Major team honours
Danish Speedway League champions	1956
Danish Speedway League silver medal	1999
Danish Speedway League bronze medal	1958, 1959

Odense Speedway has consisted of several motorcycle speedway clubs and stadia.

== History ==
The origins of speedway in Odense can be traced back to the formation of the Fyns Motor Sport (FMS) in 1924. The club built a dirt track located in Kildemosen, west Odense during 1930. These were the earliest days of speedway in Denmark because the sport had only recently began in Australia before making its way to Great Britain in 1928.

A rival club, Sportsmotorklubben Odin (SKO) were formed in 1938 and after World War II, the sport gained popularity. The Odense Athletics Stadium began to be used for international meetings from 1950, organised by a collaboration of the FMS and SKO, who effectively merged as one club.

The first official Danish Individual Speedway Championship was held at the Athletics Stadium in 1952 and several years later in 1955, the idea of a Danish Tournament for teams surfaced. The Danish Speedway League began in 1956 for Frederiksborg, Amager, Odense and Randers. The Odense team won the first tournament becoming the first champions of Denmark. However, after four editions of the tournament it was agreed by both the FMS and SKO members that the tournament was not a success and they pulled out, with the tournament subsequently ending after 1959.

The Athletics stadium hosted rounds of the Speedway World Team Cup in 1960, 1961 and 1965. The track record around the 400 metres track was held by Ove Fundin, a legendary rider within the speedway world.

The Danish tournament returned for the 1967 Danish speedway season, this time attracting seven teams, one of which was the FMS/SKO collaboration of Fynborne Odin Odense. The Fangel Speedway track was opened in 1970 by SKO, who had built a 370 metres circuit inside the larger 650 metres Fangel Motorbane and just four years later the Odense Athletics Stadium closed to speedway. On 23 April 1971, the legendary Ole Olsen set the track record at the Fangel Motorbane.

The team continued to compete for the majority of the seasons in the tournament at the new Fangel track but suffered poor results, particularly in 1980 and 1981. The team subsequently withdrew from the league and the venue hosted cars and mini speedway on a smaller track until it closed on 16 June 1985.

The new professional league was introduced in 1986 and was called the Danish Superliga and the Odense team was unable to take part, having to race at Løvel near Viborg (100 miles from Odense). However, in 1999, a combined Fjelsted/Odense team competed in the Superliga and they managed to win the silver medal during a season beset with problems. The Fjelsted track closed mid-season, resulting in the combined team having to race their remaining fixtures at the Munkebo Speedway Center. Odense, still with no home track raced at the Munkebo again in 2000.

The 57-year collaboration between FMS and SKO was dissolved in 2007, with SMO setting up a mini speedway track in the Korsløkke district and FMS setting up a motocross track at Højbjerg.
