= Fladbro Speedway =

Motorcycle speedway stadium near Randers, Denmark

- Location: Randersvej 94, 8870 Langå, Denmark
- Coordinates: 56°26′41″N 9°57′55″E
- Opened: 8 August 1954
- Length: 0.37 km (0.23 mi)

Major team honours
Danish Speedway League silver medal	1958, 1959
Danish Speedway League bronze medal	1994

Fladbro Speedway is a speedway track near Randers in Denmark. The track is located on the Randersvej road, about 5 kilometres west of Randers, on the south side of the Nørreå close to where it meets the Gudenå. The stadium hosted the speedway team Randers Speedway Club and then Kronjyllands Speedway Club, who both previously raced in the Danish Speedway League.

== History ==
Randers Motor Klub acquired a new site for a track near the Fladbro Inn in 1954, having previously raced at the Jydsk Motorbane from 1947 to 1956. The new track opened on 8 August 1954. Randers Speedway Club raced at Fladbro for many years and twice finished runner-up in the Danish Tournament (league) in 1958 and 1959. The team raced under the name Laksene (the Salmon) because of the industry connected to the city and the team returned to league action during the 1972 Danish speedway season.

Laksene continued to race in the Danish tournament and entered a second team known as Svanerne (the Swans) and later Fladbrodrdrengene.

The stadium was a venue for important events, including a qualifying round of the Speedway World Championship in 1984.

The new professional league was introduced in 1986 and was called the Danish Superliga. The Randers speedway team, as they were now known, were not selected as founder members of the top division in 1986 but did race in the 1991 Superliga. In 1994, the team won the bronze medal during the 1994 Danish speedway season.

Randers dropped out of the Superliga in 1996 after a poor 1995 season and were replaced by a new club Kronjylland Speedway Club, who started racing at Fladbro in 1997. Kronjylland stopped racing in 2004.

On 5 August 2009, Claus Vissing set a track record of 65.5 seconds.
