= Bent Nørregaard-Jensen =

Danish speedway rider

- Born: 2 December 1949 (age 76); Bække, Denmark
- Nationality: Danish

Career history
- 1969: West Ham Hammers

Individual honours
- 1974: Danish champion

Team honours
- 1969, 1970: Speedway World Pairs Championship finalist

Bent Nørregaard-Jensen (born 2 December 1949) is a former international speedway rider from Denmark. He earned five caps for the Denmark national speedway team.

== Speedway career ==
Nørregaard-Jensen was Danish champion in 1974 after winning the Danish Individual Speedway Championship. He was also the Danish Junior Champion in 1967.

Nørregaard-Jensen reached the final of the Speedway World Pairs Championship in the 1969 Speedway World Pairs Championship and the 1970 Speedway World Pairs Championship.

Nørregaard-Jensen rode in the top tier of British Speedway in 1969, riding for West Ham Hammers.

Nørregaard-Jensen broke his leg riding in the 1975 Nordic final.

== World Final appearances ==
=== World Pairs Championship ===
- 1969 - (Sweden) Stockholm (with Ole Olsen) - 4th - 15pts (4)
- 1970 - (Sweden) Malmö (with Ole Olsen) - NC (Track Reserve) - 17pts (5)

=== World Longtrack Championship ===
- 1971 - (Norway) Oslo 5th 12pts
- 1972 – (Germany) Mühldorf 5th 17pts
- 1973 - (Norway) Oslo 15th 2 pts
