= Ole Olsen (speedway rider) =

Danish speedway rider

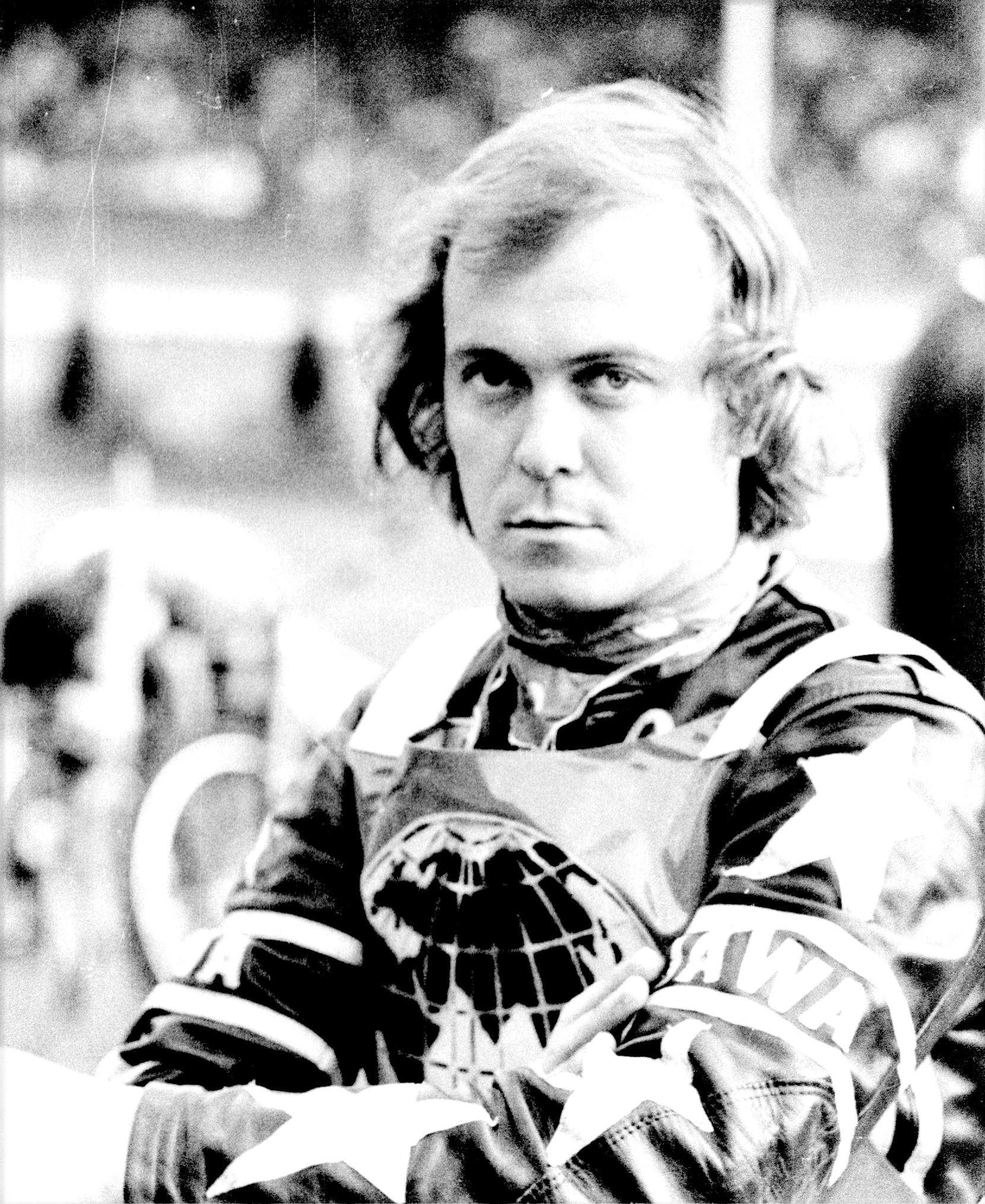
- Born: 16 November 1946 (age 80); Haderslev, Denmark
- Nickname: The Great Dane
- Nationality: Danish

Career history

Great Britain
- 1967–1969: Newcastle Diamonds
- 1970–1975: Wolverhampton Wolves
- 1976–1983: Coventry Bees

Individual honours
- 1971, 1975, 1978: World Champion
- 1967, 1968, 1969, 1970, 1971, 1972, 1973, 1975, 1976, 1977, 1979, 1981: Danish Champion
- 1971, 1973, 1974, 1975, 1976, 1977, 1978: Nordic Champion
- 1972, 1976, 1977, 1978: British League Riders Champion
- 1971, 1972, 1975, 1976, 1978: Midland Riders Champion
- 1973: Long Track World Champion
- 1970, 1971, 1972, 1975, 1977, 1979, 1980: Golden Helmet of Pardubice (CZE)
- 1976: Australian Champion
- 1972: NSW State Champion (Aust)
- 1974: British-Nordic-American Champion
- 1978: Intercontinental Champion
- 1977: Yorkshire Television Trophy
- 1970, 1971, 1972, 1977, 1978: Pride of the East
- 1971, 1972, 1973, 1974, 1975, 1977, 1978: Gold Bar - Denmark
- 1971, 1974: Blue Riband
- 1970, 1972, 1977, 1978: Brandonapolis
- 1970, 1971, 1972, 1973, 1974, 1975: Olympique
- 1973, 1975: Internationale
- 1972, 1973, 1974: The Laurels
- 1973: Golden Sovereign
- 1973, 1980: Star of Anglia
- 1975, 1978: Littlechild Trophy
- 1972: Golden Gauntlets
- 1977: Golden Hammer
- 1977: Grande Prix
- 1979: Superama

Team honours
- 1978, 1981, 1983: World Team Cup Winner
- 1979: World Pairs Champion
- 1978, 1979: British League Champion
- 1978: British League Pairs Champion
- 1981: British League Cup
- 1973, 1976, 1977, 1978, 1979, 1981, 1982: Midland Cup
- 1980: Midland League

Competition record

Representing Denmark

Speedway World Championship
Gold medal – first place	1971	
Gold medal – first place	1975	
Gold medal – first place	1978	
Silver medal – second place	1981	
Bronze medal – third place	1972	
Bronze medal – third place	1977	

Speedway World Team Cup
Gold medal – first place	1978	
Gold medal – first place	1981	
Gold medal – first place	1983	
Silver medal – second place	1979	
Silver medal – second place	1982	

Speedway World Pairs Championship
Gold medal – first place	1979	
Silver medal – second place	1973	
Silver medal – second place	1976	
Bronze medal – third place	1975	
Bronze medal – third place	1978	
Bronze medal – third place	1980	
Bronze medal – third place	1982	

Intercontinental Championship
Gold medal – first place	1978	
Silver medal – second place	1977	

Golden Helmet
Gold medal – first place	1970	
Gold medal – first place	1971	
Gold medal – first place	1972	
Gold medal – first place	1975	
Gold medal – first place	1977	
Gold medal – first place	1979	
Gold medal – first place	1980	
Silver medal – second place	1973	
Silver medal – second place	1976	
Bronze medal – third place	1978	
Bronze medal – third place	1983	

Long Track World Championship
Gold medal – first place	1973	
Silver medal – second place	1976	
Bronze medal – third place	1975	
Bronze medal – third place	1977	
Bronze medal – third place	1979	

Ole Bjarne Olsen (born 16 November 1946) is a Danish former professional motorcycle speedway rider.

Olsen won the Speedway World Championship three times, in 1971, 1975, and 1978. He also won the World Long Track Championship in 1973. In 1979 Olsen won Speedway World Pairs Championship with Hans Nielsen. In 1978, 1981 and 1983 Olsen was the captain of Denmark's winning Speedway World Team Cup teams, while also finishing second in 1979 and 1982. Denmark could only place third in the 1980 World Team Cup Intercontinental Final and missed a place in the Final held at the Olympic Stadium in Wrocław, Poland, the same track where he made his World Individual Final debut in 1970. In 2015, Olsen was named an FIM Legend for his motorcycling achievements.

Olsen's success greatly helped popularize the sport in Denmark which led to him building and opening a track at Vojens, the 15,000 capacity Vojens Speedway Center, which has held many Danish Championships as well as the 1988 and 1994 Speedway World Finals (1994 being the last under the old single meeting format) while it hosted the Speedway Grand Prix of Denmark from 1995 until 2002, after which the Danish GP was moved to the larger capacity Parken Stadium in Copenhagen.

== Career summary ==
Olsen was born in Haderslev, Denmark. He was taught to ride a speedway bike in 1966 by his friend and great rival of the 1970s, New Zealand's Ivan Mauger. He first rode in the United Kingdom for the Newcastle Diamonds in the British League from 1967 until 1969 (Mauger was also with Newcastle at the time). Olsen came to Newcastle after Mauger persuaded the Newcastle promoter Mike Parker to sign him.

Olsen then moved to the Wolverhampton Wolves, where he remained from 1970 until then end of the 1975 season, having avoided a move to Oxford Rebels. Ironically, the Rebels would beat Wolves both home and away to take the Midland Cup

In 1976, Olsen joined the Coventry Bees where he enjoyed the most success, winning two British League titles as well as the 1981 League Cup. Olsen has also won the British League Riders' Championship in 1972, 1976, 1977 and 1978.

Olsen was close to winning two further World Championship titles. In the 1972 final at London's famous Wembley Stadium, whilst in second place of his first heat he fell and failed to score. Despite winning his other four heats, he was beaten by Mauger and Sweden's Bernt Persson.

Olsen won his second World Championship in 1975 with a 15-point maximum at Wembley. The very next night he won the Danish Championship in Vojens. Unbelievably though, Olsen failed to qualify for the 1976 World Final in Poland when he could only manage 12th in the Intercontinental Final at Wembley. He only scored 6 points in the IC Final after being excluded from his first race, suffering engine failure in the very next race, and only managing three second places in his next three rides.

In 1977 at the Ullevi stadium in Gothenburg, where he had won his first championship in 1971, Australian rider John Boulger fell on a rain soaked track whilst Olsen was leading. In the re-run of the heat, Olsen was beaten by the eventual winner Mauger again, though he had to defeat England's Michael Lee in a run-off to finish third in the championship (reigning World Champion Peter Collins finished second behind Mauger).

Olsen won his final Individual World Championship in 1978 at Wembley scoring 13 points from his five rides. He finished one point clear of Englishman Gordon Kennett, and two points in front of third placed Scott Autrey from the United States. He was involved in a run-off for third place in 1979 at the Silesian Stadium in Chorzów, Poland. Olsen finished last in the run-off won by Michael Lee from American Kelly Moran and Australian champion Billy Sanders. His last place saw him finally classified 6th in his title defence. 1979 was the last of a record 6 World Championships won by Ivan Mauger.

Olsen was only a reserve rider for the 1980 World Final at the Ullevi Stadium (won by Michael Lee) and did not get to ride on the night. He won his place as a reserve by beating Scott Autrey in a run-off for 11th place at the InterContinental Final at White City in London after both riders finished on six points. He qualified for what many thought would be his last World Final in 1981 at Wembley, and ended up finishing second behind American Bruce Penhall (the first American World Champion since Jack Milne in 1937). Olsen had the distinction of winning the last Speedway World Final race held at the original Wembley Stadium. In a run-off for second place he beat fellow Dane and Coventry teammate Tommy Knudsen.

Olsen missed the 1982 World Final at the Los Angeles Memorial Coliseum, his run ending when he scored only four points and finished 15th in the InterContinental Final at Vetlanda in Sweden. Olsen qualified for what would be his last Final in 1983 at the Motodrom Halbemond in Norden, West Germany. One of four Danes in the final along with Erik Gundersen, Hans Nielsen and reserve rider Peter Ravn, Olsen finished in 6th place with 10 points.

Olsen won the Danish Championship each year from 1967 to 1973, and won the Nordic Championship in 1971, 1973, 1974, 1976, 1977, and 1978. He also won the InterContinental Final in 1978 and was the British-Nordic-American Champion in 1974. In 1976 he won the Australian Championship at the Liverpool Speedway in Sydney despite protests from other riders who did not believe he should have been allowed to ride as he was not Australian (however, the promoters saw his drawing power and included him in the field). Olsen defeated Australian legends Phil Crump and home town hero Billy Sanders to take the title. In Australia he also won the NSW State Championship in 1972, and in the same year finished second in the Australian Championship behind Jim Airey at the Rowley Park Speedway in Adelaide.

At the height of his success and popularity, Olsen was the biggest sports star in Denmark.

== Retirement ==
Olsen has remained involved in the speedway since his retirement in 1983. He co-owned the Vojens Speedway Center since its opening in 1975. The speedway hosted the 1988 and 1994 World Finals, with the 1994 final being the last to be run in the traditional single meeting format before the advent of the Speedway Grand Prix (SGP) series in 1995. From 1995 until 2002, the Speedway Center hosted the Speedway Grand Prix of Denmark before it was moved to the Parken Stadium in Copenhagen. The Speedway has hosted the Speedway Grand Prix of Nordic since 2009.

The Speedway Center also hosted Round 2 of the three round 1986 Speedway World Team Cup Final, as well as the WTC Final in 1991 and 1998. It also hosted the Speedway World Cup Final (the WTC was renamed in 2001) in 2003, 2008 and 2010 and would again host the Final in 2015. It also holds the distinction of hosting the last World Pairs Championship Final in 1993. Vojens also hosted the inaugural European Under-21 World Championship in 1977. This championship was renamed as the World Under-21 Championship from 1988.

As of the 2014 Speedway Grand Prix, Olsen is the FIM Speedway Grand Prix race director. He also serves as the SGP Track Inspector and overseas track preparation for the series.

== World final appearances ==
=== Individual World Championship ===
- 1970 - (Poland) Wrocław, Olympic Stadium - 10th - 6pts
- 1971 - (Sweden) Gothenburg, Ullevi - Winner - 15pts
- 1972 - (England) London, Wembley Stadium - 3rd - 12pts
- 1973 - (Poland) Chorzów, Silesian Stadium - 4th - 11pts
- 1974 - (Sweden) Gothenburg, Ullevi - 15th - 2pts
- 1975 - (England) London, Wembley Stadium - Winner - 15pts
- 1977 - (Sweden) Gothenburg, Ullevi - 3rd - 12pts + 3pts
- 1978 - (England) London, Wembley Stadium - Winner - 13pts
- 1979 - (Poland) Chorzów, Silesian Stadium - 6th - 11pts + 0pts
- 1980 - (Sweden) Gothenburg, Ullevi - Reserve - Did not Ride
- 1981 - (England) London, Wembley Stadium - 2nd - 12pts + 3pts
- 1983 - (Germany) Norden, Motodrom Halbemond - 6th - 10pts

=== World Pairs Championship ===
- 1969* - (Sweden) Stockholm, Gubbängens IP (with Bent Nørregaard-Jensen) - 4th - 15pts (11)
- 1970 - (Sweden) Malmö, Malmö Stadion (with Bent Nørregaard-Jensen) - NC (track reserve) - 17pt (12)
- 1973 - (Sweden) Borås (with Kurt Bøgh) - 2nd - 21pts (18)
- 1975 - (Poland) Wrocław, Olympic Stadium (with Jan Henningsen) - 3rd - 20pts (18)
- 1976 - (Sweden) Eskilstuna, Eskilstuna Motorstadion (with Finn Thomsen) - 2nd - 24pts (16)
- 1978 - (Poland) Chorzów, Silesian Stadium (with Finn Thomsen) - 3rd - 21pts (16)
- 1979 - (Denmark) Vojens, Speedway Center (with Hans Nielsen) - Winner - 25pts (15)
- 1980 - (Socialist Federal Republic of Yugoslavia) Krško, Matija Gubec Stadium (with Hans Nielsen) - 3rd - 21pts (13)
- 1981 - (Poland) Chorzów, Silesian Stadium (with Hans Nielsen) - 5th - 17pts (10)
- 1982 - (Australia) Sydney, Liverpool City Raceway (with Hans Nielsen) - 3rd - 21pts (10)

* Unofficial World Championships.

=== World Team Cup ===
- 1978 - (West Germany) Landshut, Stadion Ellermühle (with Hans Nielsen / Mike Lohmann / Finn Thomsen) - Winner - 37pts (10)
- 1979 - (England) London, White City Stadium (with Hans Nielsen / Mike Lohmann / Finn Thomsen / Bo Petersen) - 2nd - 31pts (12)
- 1981 - (West Germany) Olching, Olching Speedwaybahn (with Hans Nielsen / Erik Gundersen / Tommy Knudsen / Finn Thomsen) - Winner - 36pts (6)
- 1982 - (England) London, White City Stadium (with Hans Nielsen / Erik Gundersen / Preben Eriksen / Tommy Knudsen) - 2nd - 27pts (1)
- 1983 - (Denmark) Vojens, Speedway Center (with Erik Gundersen / Finn Thomsen / Hans Nielsen / Peter Ravn) - Winner - 37pts (7)

== World Longtrack Championship ==
- 1966 - (Germany) Mühldorf (18th)
- 1967 - Qualifying Round
- 1972 - (Germany) Mühldorf (Reserve N/S)
- 1973 - (Norway) Oslo (Champion)
- 1975 - (Socialist Federal Republic of Yugoslavia) Gornja Radgona (Third)
- 1976 - (Czech Republic) Mariánské Lázně (Second)
- 1977 - (Denmark) Aalborg (Third)
- 1978 - (Germany) Mühldorf (5th)
- 1979 - (Czech Republic) Mariánské Lázně (Third)
- 1980 - (Germany) Scheeßell (10th)
- 1981 - Semi-final
- 1982 - (Denmark) Esbjerg (7th)
- 1983 - (Czech Republic) Mariánské Lázně (14th)

== Denmark Longtrack Champion ==
- 1971, 1972, 1973

== Nordic Longtrack Champion ==
- 1973, 1982
