= Herning Speedway Klub =

Speedway club near Karup, Denmark

Club information
- Track address: Uhrebanen, Uhrevej 78, 7470 Karup, Viborg Municipality
- Country: Denmark
- Founded: 6 October 1937

Major team honours
Danish Speedway League silver medal	2000
Danish Speedway League bronze medal	1967

Herning Speedway Klub formerly Uldjyderne (the Jutland Wool Traders) is a motorcycle speedway club from Denmark, who competed in the Danish Speedway League from 1967 to until 2007.

== Track ==
The home venue of the club is the Uhrebanen, which is located approximately 25 kilometres north of Herning and 5 kilometres south of Karup on the Uhrevej 78 (56°16′22″N 9°10′35″E).

== History ==
Founded in 1937, the name Uldjyderne (the Jutland Wool Traders) originated from the town of Herning, which was a centre for the textile industry. The first track operated just after World War II and was located in the area of the modern day Herningsholm Museum and from 1956 to 1965 the speedway was held in nearby village of Sinding.

In 1967, the speedway team Uldjyderne won the bronze medal in the Danish league tournament.

The current venue at Uhrebanen was acquired in the late 1960s when moorland by the civil and military airfield was converted into a motocross track, the speedway track soon followed after opening in 1971.

During the late 1980s, the name Uldjyderne was dropped in favour of Motorsport Herning and in 1999, the Herning Motor Sport club split into two sections, one for speedway (Herning Speedway Klub) and one for motocross (Herning Motocross Klub). In 2000, the Herning Speedway Klub won the silver medal during the 2000 Danish speedway season, which was their most significant honour to date.

The club's chairman Kenneth Emil Nielsen received the Herning City Council's annual sports management award for 2022 for his efforts associated with the club.
