= 1987 Danish speedway season =

Season of speedway in Denmark

The 1987 Danish speedway season was the 1987 season of motorcycle speedway in Denmark.

== Individual ==
=== Danish Final (world championship round) ===
Six riders from the Danish final would progress to the Nordic Final as part of the 1987 Individual Speedway World Championship. The final was held on 17 May at the Slangerup Speedway Center and was won by Hans Nielsen.

Final

Pos.	Rider	Team	Scores	Total
1	Hans Nielsen	Brovst	3,3,3,3,3	15
2	Erik Gundersen	Esbjerg	3,1,3,3,3	13
3	John Jørgensen	Fjelsted	1,3,2,2,3	11
4	Jan Jacobsen	Fjelsted	2,2,2,3,2	11
5	Tommy Knudsen	Vojens	2,3,3,2,x	10
6	Peter Ravn	Randers	2,3,1,1,3	10
7	Jens Rasmussen	Fjelsted	3,2,2,1,1	9
8	Per Sørensen	Slangerup	1,1,0,3,2	7
9	Peter Glanz	Fredericia	2,1,2,2,0	7
10	Flemming Rasmussen	Fjelsted	1,2,0,1,2	6
11	John Eskildsen	Brovst	0,2,1,1,1	5
12	Kurt Hansen	Slangerup	3,0,0,0,1	4
13	Aksel Jepsen	Esbjerg	0,0,1,2,1	4
14	Frank Andersen	Fredericia	0,0,3,0,x	3
15	Ole Hansen	Fjelsted	1,1,1,0,0	3
16	Sam Nikolajsen	Frederikshavn	0,0,0,0,2	2
17	Lars Munkedal (res)	Slangerup	x,x,x,x,0	0
18	Finn Rune Jensen (res)	Vojens	x,x,x,x,0	0
19	Jan O. Pedersen	Fjelsted	dns	

=== Individual Championship ===
The 1987 Danish Individual Speedway Championship was the 1987 edition of the Danish Individual Speedway Championship. The final was held at Fjelsted on 30 August. The title was won by Hans Nielsen for the third time.

Final

Pos.	Rider	Team	Total
1	Hans Nielsen	Brovst	14
2	Erik Gundersen	Esbjerg	13
3	Brian Karger		11
4	John Jørgensen	Fjelsted	10
5	Peter Glanz	Fredericia	9
6	Tommy Knudsen	Vojens	8
7	Jan Stæchmann		8
8	Peter Ravn	Randers	8
9	Jan O. Pedersen	Fjelsted	7
10	Allan Johansen		7
11	Jan Jacobsen	Fjelsted	6
12	Gert Handberg		5
13	Ole Hansen	Fjelsted	4
14	Flemming Pedersen		4
15	Kurt Hansen	Slangerup	3
16	Per Sørensen	Slangerup	0

Key - Each heat has four riders, 3 points for a heat win, 2 for 2nd, 1 for third and 0 for last

=== Junior Championship ===
Kenneth Arnfred won the Junior Championship.

== Team ==
=== Danish Superliga ===
The 1987 Superliga was won by Fredericia for the fourth time. Frederikshavn joined the Super League.

League table

Pos	Team	P	Pts
1	Fredericia		
2	Fjelsted		
3	Slangerup		
u	Vojens		
u	Esbjerg		
u	Frederikshavn		
u	Brovst		

Key - u (did not finish in the top three)
