= 1985 Danish speedway season =

Season of speedway in Denmark

The 1985 Danish speedway season was the 1985 season of motorcycle speedway in Denmark. The season was the last season before a new professional league was introduced called the Danish Superliga. Previously the league consisted of multiple amateur teams and Danish speedway suffered from the fact that many of their top professional riders chose not to race in Denmark.

== Individual ==
=== Danish Final (world championship round) ===
Seven riders from the Danish final would progress to the Nordic Final as part of the 1985 Individual Speedway World Championship. The final was held on 5 May at Brovst and was won by Hans Nielsen.

Final

Pos.	Rider	Scores	Total
1	Hans Nielsen	3,3,3,3,3	15
2	Erik Gundersen	3,3,2,3,2	13+3
3	Preben Eriksen	2,2,3,3,3	13+2
4	Tommy Knudsen	1,3,3,2,2	11
5	Finn Rune Jensen	2,3,2,t,3	10
6	Jan O. Pedersen	3,2,1,3,3	10
7	John Jørgensen	1,2,2,2,3	10
8	Jens Rasmussen	2,2,3,1,1	9
9	Flemming Pedersen	3,1,2,0,0	6
10	John Eskildsen	1,1,0,3,1	6
11	Bo Petersen	1,1,1,1,2	6
12	Sam Nikolajsen	2,0,0,1,1	3
13	Brian Jacobsen	0,0,0,2,0	2
14	Aksel Jepsen	0,0,0,1,1	2
15	Per Sørensen	0,0,1,0,1	2
16	Frank Andersen	f,0,1,0,0	1
17	Helge Hansen (res)	x,x,x,1,x	1

=== Individual Championship ===
The 1985 Danish Individual Speedway Championship was the 1985 edition of the Danish Individual Speedway Championship. The final was held at Fredericia on 19 August. The title was won by Erik Gundersen for the third consecutive year.

Final

Pos.	Rider	Total
1	Erik Gundersen	15
2	Hans Nielsen	13
3	Tommy Knudsen	13
4	Bo Petersen	11
5	Preben Eriksen	11
6	Kurt Hansen	9
7	Jan Stæchmann	9
8	Jens Rasmussen	8
9	John Jørgensen	7
10	Flemming Rasmussen	5
11	Jan O. Pedersen	5
12	Aksel Jepsen	4
13	Alf Busk	3
14	Peter Glanz	3
15	Finn Rune Jensen	1
16	John Eskildsen	0

Key - Each heat has four riders, 3 points for a heat win, 2 for 2nd, 1 for third and 0 for last

=== Junior Championship ===
Ole Hansen won the Junior Championship.

== Team ==
=== Danish Tournament ===
The 1985 Danish Tournament was the last edition of the old league format. It was won by Blabjergdrengene (the Blåbjerg Boys), who became Danish champions for the first time in their history.

The eight leading clubs in division 1 would form the new Super League in 1986.

Division 1 league table

Pos	Team	P	Pts
1	Blabjergdrengene Outrup	10	29
2	Leoparderne Fjelsted	10	26
3	Tigers Holsted	10	24
4	Gepards Vojens	10	24
5	Faestningsdrengene	10	21
6	Ulvene Midtsjaellands	10	19
7	Vikingerne Esbjerg	10	18
8	Hanerne Hanherred	10	17
9	Cometerne Fjelsted	10	16
10	Kulsvierne Frederiksborg	10	15
11	Rodspaetterne Frederikshavn	10	11
12	Laksene Randers	10	6
13	Panthers Holsted	10	6
14	Fighters Vojens	10	4
15	Drabanterne Frederiksborg	10	3
16	Klitrengene Esbjerg	10	1

Division 2 league table

Pos	Team	P	Pts
1	Jetterne Amager	10	29
2	Skansedrengene Fredericia	10	27
3	Stjernerne Fjelsted	10	24
4	Hunters Vojens	10	23
5	Uldjyderne Herning	10	19
6	Svanerne Munkebo	10	19
7	Vestjyderne Outrup	10	16
8	Falkene Silkeborg	10	16
9	Magerne Bogense	10	16
10	Skovtroldene Frederiksborg	10	16
11	Raketterne Fjelsted	10	13
12	Ravnene Hanherred	10	8
13	Pythonerne Århus	10	7
14	Hajerne Frederikshavn	10	4
15	Fladbrodrdrengene Randers	10	2
16	Ulveungerne Midtsjaellands	10	1

Division 3 league table

Pos	Team	P	Pts
1	Wildcats Holsted	8	21
2	Ørnene Silkeborg	8	14
3	Fynborne Odin Odense	8	11
4	Kingodrengene Frederiksborg	8	9
5	Munkebo B	8	4
