= 1989 Danish speedway season =

Season of speedway in Denmark

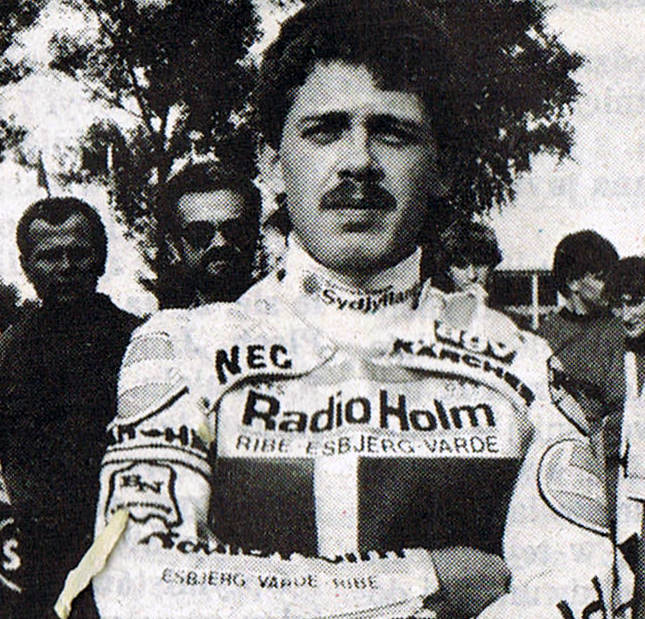
- Erik Gundersen won his fifth Danish title and won the Danish World Championship qualifier.

The 1989 Danish speedway season was the 1989 season of motorcycle speedway in Denmark.

== Individual ==
=== Danish Final (world championship round) ===
Six riders from the Danish final would progress to the Nordic Final as part of the 1989 Individual Speedway World Championship. The final was held on 19 May at Vojens and was won by Erik Gundersen.

Final

Pos.	Rider	Team	Total
1	Erik Gundersen	Esbjerg	14+3
2	Jan O. Pedersen	Fredericia	14+2
3	Brian Karger	Fredericia	14+1
4	Hans Nielsen	Brovst	12
5	John Jørgensen	Holstebro	11
6	Peter Ravn	Randers	9+3
7	Allan Johansen	Fjelsted	9+2
8	Ole Hansen	Fjelsted	7+3
9	Kenneth Arnfred	Esbjerg	7+2
10	Jan Staechmann	Vojens	6
11	Per Sørensen	Slangerup	5
12	John Eskildsen	Frederikshavn	3
13	Jan Jacobsen	Fjelsted	3
14	Henrik Kristensen	Esbjerg	3
15	Jens Henry Nielsen	Brovst	2
16	Jan Pedersen (res)	Fjelsted	1
17	Torben Hansen	Vojens	0

=== Individual Championship ===
The 1989 Danish Individual Speedway Championship was the 1989 edition of the Danish Individual Speedway Championship. The final was held at Slangerup on 2 August. The title was won by Erik Gundersen for the fifth time.

Final

Pos.	Rider	Team	Scores	Total
1	Erik Gundersen	Esbjerg	3,3,3,3,3	15
2	Hans Nielsen	Brovst	2,2,3,3,3	13+3
3	Gert Handberg	Fredericia	3,3,3,2,2	13+2
4	John Jørgensen	Holstebro	3,1,2,1,3	10
5	Per Sørensen	Slangerup	2,2,2,3,1	10
6	Frede Schött	Fredericia	1,2,3,2,2	10
7	Allan Johansen	Fjelsted	1,1,2,3,2	9
8	Brian Karger	Fredericia	3,0,1,2,2	8
9	Peter Ravn	Randers	1,3,0,0,3	7
10	Bo Petersen	Fjelsted	0,3,2,1,0	6
11	Ole Hansen	Fjelsted	0,2,1,2,1	6
12	Jens Peter Nielsen	Outrup	2,0,1,0,0	3
13	Jens Henry Nielsen	Brovst	2,1,0,0,0	3
14	Kenneth Arnfred	Esbjerg	0,1,1,1,0	3
15	Claus Jacobsen	Esbjerg	1,0,0,1,1	3
16	Jan Pedersen	Fjelsted	0,0,0,0,1	1
17	Jan O. Pedersen	Fredericia	dns	

Key - Each heat has four riders, 3 points for a heat win, 2 for 2nd, 1 for third and 0 for last

=== Junior Championship ===
Johnny Jørgensen won the Junior Championship.

== Team ==
=== Danish Superliga ===
The 1989 Superliga was won by Fredericia for the 5th time. The team included Jan O. Pedersen, Gert Handberg, Brian Karger and Frede Schött. The same eight teams as in 1988 competed in the Superliga.

League table

Pos	Team	P	Pts
1	Fredericia	14	
2	Fjelsted	14	
3	Slangerup	14	
4	Holstebro	14	
5	Brovst	14	
6	Esbjerg	14	
7	Frederikshavn	14	
8	Vojens	14	
