= 1988 Danish speedway season =

Season of speedway in Denmark

The 1988 Danish speedway season was the 1988 season of motorcycle speedway in Denmark.

== Individual ==
=== Danish Final (world championship round) ===
Seven riders from the Danish final would progress to the Nordic Final as part of the 1988 Individual Speedway World Championship. The final was held on 8 May at Outrup and was won by Hans Nielsen.

Final

| Pos. | Rider | Team | Total |
|---|---|---|---|
| 1 | Hans Nielsen | Brovst | 15 |
| 2 | Jan O. Pedersen | Fjelsted | 14 |
| 3 | Erik Gundersen | Esbjerg | 13 |
| 4 | Peter Ravn | Randers | 10 |
| 5 | Peter Glanz | | 9 |
| 6 | Per Sørensen | Slangerup | 9 |
| 7 | John Jørgensen | Fjelsted | 8+3 |
| 8 | Tommy Knudsen | Vojens | 8+2 |
| 9 | Jan Stæchmann | Vojens | 7 |
| 10 | Frank Andersen | | 6 |
| 11 | John Eskildsen | | 6 |
| 12 | Flemming Pedersen | | 6 |
| 13 | Sam Nikolajsen | | 5 |
| 14 | Aksel Jepsen | | 4 |
| 15 | Jan Pedersen | Fjelsted | 0 |
| 16 | Finn Rune Jensen | | 0 |

=== Individual Championship ===
The 1988 Danish Individual Speedway Championship was the 1988 edition of the Danish Individual Speedway Championship. The final was held at Brovst on 14 August. The title was won by Jan O. Pedersen.

Final

| Pos. | Rider | Team | Total |
|---|---|---|---|
| 1 | Jan O. Pedersen | Fjelsted | 15 |
| 2 | Erik Gundersen | Esbjerg | 13 |
| 3 | Jan Stæchmann | Vojens | 11 |
| 4 | Hans Nielsen | Brovst | 11 |
| 5 | Tommy Knudsen | Vojens | 11 |
| 6 | Jens Henry Nielsen | Brovst | 8 |
| 7 | Allan Johansen | | 8 |
| 8 | Brian Karger | | 7 |
| 9 | Kenneth Arnfred | Esbjerg | 6 |
| 10 | Jan Jacobsen | Fjelsted | 5 |
| 11 | Preben Eriksen | | 4 |
| 12 | John Eskildsen | | 3 |
| 13 | Torben Hansen | | 3 |
| 14 | Henrik Kristensen | Esbjerg | 2 |
| 15 | Lars Munkedal | | 2 |
| 16 | John Jørgensen | Fjelsted | 0 |

Key - Each heat has four riders, 3 points for a heat win, 2 for 2nd, 1 for third and 0 for last

=== Junior Championship ===
Jan Mikkelsen won the Junior Championship.

== Team ==
=== Danish Superliga ===
The 1988 Superliga was won by Slangerup for the first time. Eight teams competed in the 1988 Superliga after Holstebro joined the league.

League table

| Pos | Team | P | Pts |
|---|---|---|---|
| 1 | Slangerup | | |
| 2 | Frederikshavn | | |
| 3 | Fjelsted | | |
| u | Holstebro | | |
| u | Brovst | | |
| u | Esbjerg | | |
| u | Vojens | | |
| u | Fredericia | | |

- Key - u (not placed in top three)

Teams

Slangerup

- Svend Mortensen
- Jesper Olsen
- Kurt Hansen
- Per Sørensen

Frederikshavn

Fjelsted

- Jan O Pedersen
- Ole Hansen
- Jan Jacobsen
- Allan Hansen
- Jan Pedersen

Holstebro

- John Jørgensen
- Henka Gustafsson
- Tom P. Knudsen
- Kristian Ager
- Lars Hammer

Brovst

- Hans Nielsen
- Jens H Nielsen
- Keld Hansen
- Jess Frederiksen
- Henrik Ziegler

Esbjerg

- Erik Gundersen
- Lars Henrik Jørgensen
- Kenneth Arnfred
- Robert Csillik
- Brian Koch

Vojens

- Tommy Knudsen
- Jan Stæchmann

Fredericia
