= 1986 Danish speedway season =

Season of speedway in Denmark

The 1986 Danish speedway season was the 1986 season of motorcycle speedway in Denmark. The season was hugely significant because a new professional league was introduced called the Danish Superliga. Previously the league consisted of multiple amateur teams and Danish speedway suffered from the fact that many of their top professional riders chose not to race in Denmark.

== Individual ==
=== Danish Final (world championship round) ===
Five riders from the Danish final would progress to the Nordic Final as part of the 1986 Individual Speedway World Championship. The final was held on 8 May at the Hele Fyns Speedway Center in Fjelsted and was won by Hans Nielsen.

Final

| Pos. | Rider | Scores | Total |
|---|---|---|---|
| 1 | Hans Nielsen | 3,2,3,3,3 | 14 |
| 2 | Erik Gundersen | 3,3,3,2,2 | 13+3 |
| 3 | Bo Petersen | 2,3,2,3,3 | 13+2 |
| 4 | Jan O. Pedersen | 1,2,3,3,3 | 12 |
| 5 | John Jørgensen | 3,1,3,3,2 | 12 |
| 6 | Sam Nikolajsen | f,3,1,0,3 | 7 |
| 7 | Per Sørensen | 1,1,2,0,2 | 7 |
| 8 | John Eskildsen | 2,0,1,2,2 | 7 |
| 9 | Jens Rasmussen | 1,2,2,2,1 | 7 |
| 10 | Peter Glanz | f,2,2,1,ef | 5 |
| 11 | Tommy Knudsen | 3,1,f,1,ef | 5 |
| 12 | Peter Ravn | 2,1,f,1,1 | 5 |
| 13 | Flemming Pedersen | 1,3,1,ef,0 | 4 |
| 14 | Kurt Hansen | 2,0,1,1,0 | 4 |
| 15 | Preben Eriksen | 0,ef,0,2,1 | 3 |
| 16 | Aksel Jepsen | 0,0,ef,0.0 | 0 |

=== Individual Championship ===
The 1986 Danish Individual Speedway Championship was the 1986 edition of the Danish Individual Speedway Championship. The final was held at Randers on ? August. The title was won by Erik Gundersen for the fourth consecutive year.

Final

| Pos. | Rider | Total |
|---|---|---|
| 1 | Erik Gundersen | 14 |
| 2 | Hans Nielsen | 12 |
| 3 | Tommy Knudsen | 12 |
| 4 | John Jørgensen | 12 |
| 5 | Jan O. Pedersen | 8 |
| 6 | Peter Glanz | 8 |
| 7 | Allan Johansen | 6 |
| 8 | Aksel Jepsen | 3 |
| 9 | John Eskildsen | 3 |
| 10 | Ole Hansen | 3 |
| | Flemming Rasmussen | |
| | Bent Thomassen | |
| | Jens Rasmussen | |

Key - Each heat has four riders, 3 points for a heat win, 2 for 2nd, 1 for third and 0 for last

=== Junior Championship ===
Gert Handberg won the Junior Championship.

== Team ==
=== Danish Superliga ===
The 1986 Superliga was the first edition of the new league format. It was won by Fjelsted (the Leopards), who became Danish champions for the second time in their history. The team included Lars Henrik Jørgensen, Ole Hansen, Flemming Rasmussen, Jan Jakobsen and Allan Johansen. The eight clubs competing were chosen from the top eight from the 1985 division 1 season, with the exception of Ulvene Midtsjaellands who were replaced by Kulsvierne Frederiksborg (Slangerup).

League table

| Pos | Team | P | Pts |
|---|---|---|---|
| 1 | Fjelsted | | |
| 2 | Fredericia | | |
| 3 | Slangerup | | |
| u | Vojens | | |
| u | Esbjerg | | |
| u | Outrup | | |
| u | Holsted | | |
| u | Brovst | | |

Key - u (did not finish in the top three)
