= 1990 Danish speedway season =

Motorcycle racing season in Denmark

The 1990 Danish speedway season was the 1990 season of motorcycle speedway in Denmark.

== Individual ==
=== Danish Final (world championship round) ===
Six riders from the Danish final would progress to the Nordic Final as part of the 1990 Individual Speedway World Championship. The final was held on 20 May at Holsted and was won by Jan O. Pedersen.

Final

Pos.	Rider	Team	Total
1	Jan O. Pedersen	Fjelsted	13
2	Hans Nielsen	Brovst	12
3	Bo Petersen	Saeby	11+3
4	Jens Henry Nielsen	Brovst	11+2
5	Jan Pedersen	Fjelsted	10+3
6	Brian Karger	Fredericia	10+2
7	John Jørgensen	Fjelsted	10+1
8	Gert Handberg	Holsted	10+0
9	Per Sørensen	Slangerup	6
10	Henrik Kristensen	Holsted	5
11	Ole Hansen	Fjelsted	5
12	Allan Jensen	Holsted	4
13	Peter Ravn	Randers	4
14	Kenneth Arnfred	Esbjerg	3
15	John Eskildsen	Saeby	3
16	Jens Peter Nielsen	Outrup	3

=== Individual Championship ===
The 1990 Danish Individual Speedway Championship was the 1990 edition of the Danish Individual Speedway Championship. The final was held at Outrup on 5 August. The title was won by Hans Nielsen for the fourth time.

Final

Pos.	Rider	Team	Scores	Total
1	Hans Nielsen	Brovst	3,3,2,3,3	14
2	Bo Petersen	Saeby	3,2,3,2,3	13
3	Jan O. Pedersen	Fjelsted	3,3,0,2,3	11
4	John Jørgensen	Fjelsted	0,3,3,3,1	10
5	Brian Andersen	Fredericia	2,3,2,1,2	10
6	Gert Handberg	Holsted	3,2,2,0,2	9
7	Johnny Jørgensen	Brovst	2,1,1,1,3	8
8	Jesper Olsen	Slangerup	2,1,0,2,2	7
9	Per Sørensen	Slangerup	0,0,1,3,2	6
10	Jens Henry Nielsen	Brovst	0,2,3,1,0	6
11	Hans Clausen	Holsted	1,1,1,3,0	6
12	Ole Hansen	Fjelsted	1,2,0,2,1	6
13	Lars Henrik Jørgensen	Fredericia	0,1,3,0,0	4
14	Jan Pedersen	Fjelsted	1,0,2,1,0	4
15	Andre Larsen	Esbjerg	1,0,1,0,1	3
16	Jens Peter Nielsen	Outrup	2,0,0,0,0	2
17	Richard Juul	Randers	1	1

Key - Each heat has four riders, 3 points for a heat win, 2 for 2nd, 1 for third and 0 for last

=== Junior Championship ===
Bo Skov Eriksen won the Junior Championship.

== Team ==
=== Danish Superliga ===
The 1990 Superliga was won by Brovst for the first time. The team included Hans Nielsen, Jens Henry Nielsen and Claes Ivarsson.

League table

Pos	Team	P	Pts
1	Brovst	14	30
2	Fredericia	14	28
3	Saeby	14	25
4	Fjelsted	14	24
5	Holsted	14	22
6	Slangerup	14	18
7	Holstebro	14	14
8	Esbjerg	14	6
