= 1983 British League season =

British speedway season

- League: British League
- Champions: Cradley Heathens
- Knockout Cup: Cradley Heathens
- League Cup: Belle Vue Aces
- Individual: Erik Gundersen
- Midland Cup: Cradley Heathens
- London Cup: Wimbledon Dons
- Highest average: Hans Nielsen
- Division/s below: 1983 National League

The 1983 British League season was the 49th season of the top tier of motorcycle speedway in the United Kingdom and the 19th known as the British League.

== Summary ==
Cradley Heathens won the league and cup double. Despite losing their double world champion Bruce Penhall to retirement the Cradley side performed just as well. Erik Gundersen, Simon Wigg and Lance King were now some of the world's leading riders and backed up by Phil Collins, Alan Grahame and Peter Ravn they were a formidable team. Even Penhall's replacement, a new signing from Denmark Jan O. Pedersen was already showing signs of a bright future.

This would also be the final season of speedway for three-time world champion Ole Olsen, who announced his retirement.

== Final table ==
Pos	Team	PL	W	D	L	Pts
1	Cradley Heath Heathens	28	26	0	2	52
2	Ipswich Witches	28	22	1	5	45
3	Coventry Bees	28	19	0	9	38
4	Reading Racers	28	17	0	11	34
5	Belle Vue Aces	28	15	3	10	33
6	Wimbledon Dons	28	15	1	12	31
7	Hackney Hawks	28	14	0	14	28
8	King's Lynn Stars	28	12	1	15	25
9	Birmingham Brummies	28	12	0	16	24
10	Sheffield Tigers	28	10	2	16	22
11	Halifax Dukes	28	10	1	17	21
12	Leicester Lions	28	9	2	17	20
13	Poole Pirates	28	9	0	19	18
14	Eastbourne Eagles	28	7	1	20	15
15	Swindon Robins	28	7	0	21	14

M = Matches; W = Wins; D = Draws; L = Losses; Pts = Total Points

== Fixtures and results ==
Home \ Away	BV	BIR	COV	CH	EAS	HAC	HAL	IPS	KL	LEI	PP	RR	SHE	SWI	WIM
Belle Vue		42–36	42–36	29–49	45–33	46–31	45–33	41–37	46–32	41–37	49–28	42–36	42–36	47–31	42–36
Birmingham	40–38		38–40	36–42	55–23	38–39	53–25	40–38	48–30	45–33	52–26	44–33	50–28	43–35	36–42
Coventry	55–23	46–32		40–38	58–20	43–34	54–24	36–42	47–31	45–33	47–31	48–30	52–26	53–25	43–35
Cradley Heath	55–23	42–36	49–29		56–22	55–23	56–22	49–29	59–19	56–22	57–21	45–33	56–22	53–25	59–19
Eastbourne	40–38	41–36	36–42	22–56		31–47	42–36	35–43	40–38	43–35	38–40	32–46	45–33	40–38	39–39
Hackney	41–37	42–36	38–39	29–49	45–33		41–37	35–43	40–38	60–18	41–37	43–35	54–24	49–29	32–46
Halifax	38–40	44–34	36–42	37–41	51–27	43–35		38–40	47–31	46–32	47–31	40–38	48–30	43–35	43–35
Ipswich	39–39	50–28	41–37	46–32	45–33	47–31	50–28		42–36	42–36	47–31	42–36	43–35	41–37	47–31
King's Lynn	40–38	43–35	53–25	31–47	51–27	43–35	43–34	31–47		45–33	47–31	43–35	53–25	49–29	50–28
Leicester	39–39	42–36	40–38	22–56	50–28	48–30	40–38	35–43	39–39		44–34	37–41	55–23	38–40	50–28
Poole	41–36	42–36	36–42	27–51	38–40	49–28	56–22	37–41	45–33	43–35		36–42	38–40	41–37	42–36
Reading	45–33	41–37	43–35	35–43	43–34	43–35	50–28	45–33	46–32	40–37	46–32		51–27	48–30	44–34
Sheffield	39–39	44–34	41–37	32–46	54–24	44–34	39–39	41–37	40–38	37–41	45–33	42–36		47–30	38–40
Swindon	34–44	30–47	28–50	29–49	46–32	38–40	45–33	37–41	44–34	40–38	43–35	34–44	40–38		35–43
Wimbledon	52–26	45–33	47–30	35–43	45–33	37–40	45–33	37–41	43–35	46–31	42–36	46–32	62–16	48–30	

Legend: Blue = home team win; Yellow = draw; Red = away team win.

== Top ten riders (league averages) ==
	Rider	Nat	Team	C.M.A.
1	Dennis Sigalos	(United States)	Ipswich	10.99
2	Hans Nielsen	(Denmark)	Birmingham	10.77
3	Erik Gundersen	(Denmark)	Cradley	10.59
4	Mitch Shirra	(New Zealand)	Reading	10.38
5	Michael Lee	(England)	Poole	10.36
6	Kenny Carter	(England)	Halifax	10.34
7	Billy Sanders	(Australia)	Ipswich	10.27
8	Chris Morton	(England)	Belle Vue	10.17
9	Phil Crump	(Australia)	Swindon	9.88
10	Jan Andersson	(Sweden)	Reading	9.61

== British League Knockout Cup ==
The 1983 Speedway Star British League Knockout Cup was the 45th edition of the Knockout Cup for tier one teams. Cradley Heath Heathens were the winners.

First round

Date	Team one	Score	Team two
09/07	Belle Vue	56-22	Halifax
30/06	Wimbledon	46-32	Swindon
25/06	Halifax	41-37	Belle Vue
25/06	Swindon	34-44	Wimbledon
19/06	Eastbourne	34-43	Kings Lynn
11/06	Coventry	45-33	Sheffield
11/06	Cradley Heath	46-32	Hackney
11/06	Kings Lynn	47-31	Eastbourne
09/06	Sheffield	37-41	Coventry
30/05	Birmingham	43-35	Reading
30/05	Reading	44-34	Birmingham
27/05	Hackney	35-43	Cradley Heath
24/05	Leicester	40-38	Ipswich
19/05	Ipswich	43-34	Leicester

Quarter-finals

Date	Team one	Score	Team two
21/08	Kings Lynn	45-33	Belle Vue
20/08	Belle Vue	58-20	Kings Lynn
23/07	Coventry	44-34	Wimbledon
21/07	Wimbledon	38-40	Coventry
18/07	Reading	40-38	Ipswich
13/07	Poole	35-43	Cradley Heath
09/07	Cradley Heath	53-25	Poole
07/07	Ipswich	39-39	Reading

Semi-finals

Date	Team one	Score	Team two
09/10	Belle Vue	38-40	Coventry
08/10	Coventry	44-34	Belle Vue
24/09	Cradley Heath	47-31	Reading
19/09	Reading	32-46	Cradley Heath

Final

First leg=

12 October 1983

Coventry Bees Ole Olsen 10 Gary Guglielmi 8 Sam Nikolajsen 7 Steve Bastable 5 Rick Miller4 Finn Thomsen (guest) 3 Kevin Hawkins 2	39 - 39	Cradley Heath Erik Gundersen 13 Simon Wigg 11 Phil Collins 8 Alan Grahame 3 Peter Ravn 2 Jan O. Pedersen 2 Lance King R/R

Brandon Stadium

Second leg

17 October 1983

Cradley Heath Erik Gundersen 13 Alan Grahame 9 Peter Ravn 7 Simon Wigg 7 Phil Collins 6 Jan O. Pedersen 5 Lance King R/R	47 - 31	Coventry Bees Ole Olsen 10 Gary Guglielmi 10 Bo Petersen (guest) 7 Steve Bastable 2 Rick Miller 1 Kevin Hawkins 1 Sam Nikolajsen 0

Dudley Wood Stadium

Cradley Heath were declared Knockout Cup Champions, winning on aggregate 86-70.

== League Cup ==
The League Cup was split into North and South sections. The two-legged final was won by Belle Vue Aces beating Coventry Bees in the final 86–70 on aggregate.

North Group

Pos	Team	PL	W	D	L	Pts
1	Coventry Bees	12	9	1	2	19
2	Belle Vue Aces	12	8	0	4	16
3	Cradley Heathens	12	7	1	4	15
4	Halifax Dukes	12	5	0	7	10
5	Leicester Lions	12	4	0	8	8
6	Sheffield Tigers	12	4	0	8	8
7	Birmingham Brummies	12	4	0	8	8

South Group

Pos	Team	PL	W	D	L	Pts
1	Wimbledon Dons	14	11	0	3	22
2	Ipswich Witches	14	9	0	5	18
3	Reading Racers	14	8	0	6	16
4	Poole Pirates	14	8	0	6	16
5	Hackney Hawks	14	8	0	6	16
6	King's Lynn Stars	13	6	1	6	13
7	Eastbourne Eagles	14	2	1	11	5
8	Swindon Robins	13	2	0	11	4

North Group

Home \ Away	BV	BIR	COV	CH	HAL	LEI	SHE
Belle Vue		48–30	48–30	41–37	45–33	41–37	52–26
Birmingham	42–36		36–42	35–40	48–30	42–36	40–38
Coventry	40–38	40–38		39–39	37–40	53–25	49–29
Cradley	52–26	56–22	35–43		43–35	45–33	50–28
Halifax	38–40	44–34	36–42	41–37		43–35	43–35
Leicester	42–36	43–35	38–40	37–41	47–31		43–35
Sheffield	31–47	44–34	37–41	43–35	45–33	42–36	

Legend: Blue = home team win; Yellow = draw; Red = away team win.

South Group

Home \ Away	EAS	HAC	IPS	KL	PP	REA	SWI	WIM
Eastbourne		37–41	43–35	39–39	32–46	32–46	43–35	31–47
Hackney	48–30		41–36	41–36	48–30	40–38	50–28	33–45
Ipswich	43–35	37–41		43–35	44–37	40–38	42–36	42–36
King's Lynn	54–24	46–32	34–44		44–34	42–36	37–35a	46–32
Poole	45–33	48–30	40–37	42–36		38–40	42–36	47–31
Reading	47–31	47–31	35–43	46–32	41–37		42–36	33–45
Swindon	43–35	43–35	34–44	31–47	36–42	32–46		37–41
Wimbledon	40–38	45–33	51–27	43–35	42–36	40–38	44–34	

Legend: Blue = home team win; Yellow = draw; Red = away team win.

Final

Date	Team one	Score	Team two
22/10	Coventry	39–39	Belle Vue
23/10	Belle Vue	47–31	Coventry

== Leading final averages ==
Rider	Team	Average
(Denmark) Hans Nielsen	Birmingham	10.82
(United States) Dennis Sigalos	Ipswich	10.75
(England) Chris Morton	Belle Vue	10.30
(England) Kenny Carter	Halifax	10.28
(Denmark) Erik Gundersen	Cradley Heath	10.23
(England) Michael Lee	Poole	10.16
(Australia) Phil Crump	Swindon	10.03
(New Zealand) Mitch Shirra	Reading	10.02
(Denmark) Tommy Knudsen	Coventry	9.87
(Australia) Billy Sanders	Ipswich	9.70
(Denmark) Ole Olsen	Coventry	9.56

== Riders' Championship ==
Erik Gundersen won the British League Riders' Championship, held at Hyde Road on 15 October.

Pos.	Rider	Heat Scores	Total
1	(Denmark) Erik Gundersen	3 3 3 2 3	14
2	(England) Michael Lee	0 3 3 3 3	12
3	(Denmark) Hans Nielsen	2 3 3 2 2	12
4	(England) Kenny Carter	1 1 2 3 3	10
5	(England) John Louis	0 3 1 2 3	9
6	(Australia) Billy Sanders	3 1 1 3 1	9
7	(New Zealand) Mitch Shirra	2 2 0 3 1	8
8	(Denmark) Bo Petersen	3 2 1 0 2	8
9	(Australia) Phil Crump	3 0 2 2 1	8
10	(Denmark) Ole Olsen	1 2 2 0 2	7
11	(Sweden) Jan Andersson	2 1 2 1 1	7
12	(England) Paul Woods	2 2 0 1 0	5
13	(New Zealand) David Bargh	1 0 1 1 2	5
14	(England) Chris Morton	1 1 3 0 0	5
15	(England) Mark Courtney	0 0 0 1 0	1
16	(Finland) Kai Niemi	0 0 0 - -	0
17	(England) Martin Scarisbrick (res)	0 - - - -	0
18	(England) David Wild (res)	0 - - - -	0

- ef=engine failure, f=fell, x=excluded r-retired

== Midland Cup ==
Cradley Heath won the Midland Cup. The competition consisted of five teams.

First round

Team one	Team two	Score
Leicester	Swindon	38–40, 32–46

Semi final round

Team one	Team two	Score
Coventry	Birmingham	48–30, 38–40
Cradley	Swindon	60–18, 40–38

=== Final ===
First leg

19 October 1983

Coventry Seve Bastable 11 Rick Miller 7 Kevin Hawkins 6 Sam Nikolajsen 5 Gary Guglielmi 4 John Davis (guest) 4 Keith White 1	38–40	Cradley Heath Erik Gundersen 11 Simon Wigg 6 Alan Grahame 6 Phil Collins 6 Peter Ravn 5 Jan O Pedersen 3 Simon Cross 3

Brandon Stadium

Second leg

24 October 1983

Cradley Heath Lance King 11 Erik Gundersen 10 Alan Grahame 9 Phil Collins 9 Peter Ravn 7 Simon Wigg 6 Jan O Pedersen 4	56–22	Coventry Jan Andersson (guest) 12 Rick Miller 4 Gary Guglielmi 3 Seve Bastable 1 Kevin Hawkins 1 Sam Nikolajsen 1 Keith White 0

Dudley Wood Stadium

Cradley won on aggregate 96–60

== London Cup ==
Wimbledon won the London Cup but the competition consisted of just Wimbledon and Hackney.

Results

Team	Score	Team
Wimbledon	50–28	Hackney
Hackney	43–35	Wimbledon

== Riders & final averages ==
Belle Vue

- (England) Chris Morton 10.30
- (England) Peter Collins 9.13
- (New Zealand) Larry Ross 7.37
- (England) Peter Carr 5.62
- (England) Louis Carr 5.38
- (Denmark) Peter Ravn 4.95
- (England) Andy Smith 4.48
- (Scotland) Kenny McKinna 4.30
- (England) Martin Scarisbrick 1.09

Birmingham

- (Denmark) Hans Nielsen 10.82
- (England) Andy Grahame 8.29
- (England) Neil Evitts 6.88
- (United States) Shawn McConnell 5.71
- (Germany) Karl Maier 5.63
- (Czech Republic) Petr Ondrašík 5.36
- (Denmark) John Jørgensen 5.01
- (Denmark) Kent Noer 4.85
- (England) Paul Thorp 3.13
- (England) Mike Wilding 2.07

Coventry

- (Denmark) Tommy Knudsen 9.87
- (Denmark) Ole Olsen 9.56
- (Australia) Gary Guglielmi 8.07
- (England) Steve Bastable 6.79
- (England) Kevin Hawkins 5.44
- (Denmark) Sam Nikolajsen 5.23
- (United States) Rick Miller 4.87

Cradley Heath

- (Denmark) Erik Gundersen 10.23
- (England) Simon Wigg 8.86
- (United States) Lance King 8.74
- (England) Alan Grahame 8.69
- (England) Phil Collins 7.98
- (Denmark) Peter Ravn 7.97
- (Denmark) Jan O. Pedersen 6.78
- (England) Simon Cross 6.00
- (England) Andy Reid 2.54
- (Australia) David Cheshire 2.33

Eastbourne

- (England) Paul Woods 8.73
- (Denmark) John Eskildsen 6.53
- (England) Mike Lanham 4.18
- (England) Dave Kennett 3.87
- (Sweden) Anders Eriksson 3.79
- (Sweden) Lillebror Johansson 3.79
- (Poland) Piotr Pyszny 3.75
- (Zimbabwe) Denzil Kent 3.65
- (England) Trevor Geer 3.56
- (Italy) Ottaviano Righetto 2.55
- (Denmark) Rene Christiansen 1.93
- (Germany) Peter Schroeck 0.27

Hackney

- (Denmark) Bo Petersen 8.47
- (Denmark) Finn Thomsen 7.94
- (Denmark) Jens Rasmussen 6.74
- (England) Sean Willmott 6.30
- (Australia) John Titman 6.25
- (England) Martin Hagon 4.83
- (Czech Republic) Antonín Kasper Jr. 4.39
- (England) Bob Garrad 4.30

Halifax

- (England) Kenny Carter 10.28
- (Australia) Steve Baker 6.60
- (England) Doug Wyer 6.17
- (England) Steve Finch 5.77
- (England) Martin Dixon 5.59
- (England) Craig Pendlebury 5.41
- (Italy) Gianni Famari 3.52
- (England) Eric Boocock 2.40

Ipswich

- (United States) Dennis Sigalos 10.75
- (Australia) Billy Sanders 9.70
- (England) Jeremy Doncaster 6.79
- (Denmark) Preben Eriksen 6.72
- (England) Nigel Flatman 4.82
- (England) Andy Hines 4.51
- (England) Carl Baldwin 4.08
- (England) Andy Hibbs 4.06
- (England) Andy Nightingale 0.35

King's Lynn

- (England) John Louis 8.45
- (England) Gordon Kennett 8.39
- (Sweden) Richard Hellsen 7.02
- (England) Colin Richardson 6.29
- (England) Kevin Jolly 6.21
- (England) Melvyn Taylor 5.95
- (England) Keith Bloxsome 5.25

Leicester

- (England) Mark Courtney 8.66
- (England) Les Collins 8.24
- (England) Neil Collins 7.17
- (Australia) Steve Regeling 5.95
- (Denmark) Finn Jensen 5.11
- (England) Colin Cook 5.10
- (England) Mike Lanham 4.98
- (England) Eric Monaghan 4.76
- (Denmark) Steen Mastrup 3.85
- (Australia) Phil Herne 3.81

Poole

- (England) Michael Lee 10.16
- (England) John Davis 7.72
- (England) Kevin Smith 6.95
- (Czech Republic) Václav Verner 6.06
- (England) Neil Middleditch 5.38
- (England) Andy Campbell 4.74
- (Australia) Stan Bear 4.41
- (United States) Sam Ermolenko 4.25 (4 matches only)
- (Denmark) Brian Jakobsen 4.23
- (Sweden) Erik Stenlund 3.56
- (England) Keith Millard 2.96

Reading

- (New Zealand) Mitch Shirra 10.02
- (Sweden) Jan Andersson 9.47
- (United States) Bobby Schwartz 9.02
- (Sweden) Pierre Brannefors 7.28
- (England) Tim Hunt 4.31
- (Denmark) Peter Glanz 3.85
- (Czech Republic) Stanislav Urban 3.24
- (England) John Grahame 2.74

Sheffield

- (United States) Shawn Moran 9.43
- (New Zealand) David Bargh 7.03
- (England) Phil White 6.26
- (England) Dave Morton 5.84
- (England) Reg Wilson 5.09
- (England) Eric Monaghan 3.97
- (New Zealand) Alan Mason 3.26
- (England) Gerald Short 2.13

Swindon

- (Australia) Phil Crump 10.03
- (Sweden) Bjorn Andersson 7.01
- (Australia) Phil Herne 5.65
- (England) Martin Yeates 5.23
- (United States) Steve Gresham 5.14
- (England) Malcolm Holloway 4.99
- (Denmark) Alf Busk 4.31
- (Denmark) Steen Mastrup 3.57
- (Denmark) Per Sorensen 2.88
- (Czech Republic) Milan Špinka 1.93

Wimbledon

- (England) Dave Jessup 9.25
- (England) Malcolm Simmons 7.86
- (Finland) Kai Niemi 7.67
- (Finland) Ari Koponen 6.55
- (England) Kelvin Tatum 6.19
- (Zimbabwe) Mike Ferreira 5.95
- (England) Roger Johns 5.18

== See also ==
- List of United Kingdom Speedway League Champions
- Knockout Cup (speedway)
