= 1986 British League season =

British motorcycle speedway season

- League: British League
- Champions: Oxford Cheetahs
- Knockout Cup: Oxford & Cradley (shared)
- League Cup: Oxford & Cradley (shared)
- Individual: Hans Nielsen
- Pairs: Oxford Cheetahs
- Midland Cup: Oxford Cheetahs
- Highest average: Hans Nielsen
- Division/s below: 1986 National League

The 1986 British League season was the 52nd season of the top tier of speedway in the United Kingdom and the 22nd known as the British League.

== Summary ==
Oxford Cheetahs won the league for the second consecutive year and the treble by sharing both the Speedway Star Knockout Cup and League Cup with Cradley Heath Heathens. Despite the easy manner of their 1985 league success Oxford made critical changes which ensured domination for a second consecutive season. They were forced to make changes due to the averages points limit that applied to all teams. Hans Nielsen and Simon Wigg were retained, as were Andy Grahame and Marvyn Cox but Jens Ramussen was replaced with Per Sorensen and Nigel De'ath was brought in as full time reserve. Both Sorensen and De'ath maintained good form throughout the season and combined with the heavy scores of the heat leaders the team were able to win the league again. Cradley returned to form and provided Oxford with their main challenge, the rivalry between the Nielsen of Oxford and Erik Gundersen of Cradley was memorable. Nielsen also replaced Gundersen as the world champion by the end of the season and the pair were World Pairs and World Cup winners.

After being unable to afford the rent for The Shay stadium, Halifax relocated to Odsal Stadium and rebranded as the Bradford Dukes. They were to be led by Yorkshireman and England's leading rider Kenny Carter, but tragedy unfolded on 21 May when Carter shot dead his wife and then took his own life. It would take several years for the club to find stability.

== Final table ==
Pos	Team	PL	W	D	L	BP	Pts
1	Oxford Cheetahs	18	18	0	0	8	44
2	Cradley Heath Heathens	20	13	3	4	9	38
3	Wolverhampton Wolves	19	13	0	6	6	32
4	Sheffield Tigers	19	10	2	7	6	28
5	Coventry Bees	20	10	1	9	6	27
6	Bradford Dukes	20	8	1	11	4	21
7	Reading Racers	20	7	3	10	4	21
8	Swindon Robins	19	8	1	10	4	21
9	Ipswich Witches	20	7	1	12	3	18
10	Belle Vue Aces	19	5	0	14	2	12
11	King's Lynn Stars	20	2	0	18	0	4

M = Matches; W = Wins; D = Draws; L = Losses; Pts = Total Points

== Fixtures and results ==
Home \ Away	BV	BRA	COV	CH	IPS	KL	OX	RR	SHE	SWI	WOL
Belle Vue		49–29	40–38	35–43	37–41	44–34	33–45	31–47	32–46	–	45–33
Bradford	40–37		33–45	39–39	56–22	53–25	35–43	48–29	43–35	46–32	50–28
Coventry	52–26	42–36		40–38	55–23	54–24	32–46	51–27	40–38	34–44	38–40
Cradley Heath	47–31	42–36	43–35		47–31	46–32	33–45	55–23	45–33	42–36	43–35
Ipswich	42–36	47–31	35–43	32–46		46–32	36–42	40–38	44–34	32–46	37–41
King's Lynn	35–43	32–46	35–43	23–55	36–42		33–45	29–49	35–43	36–42	33–45
Oxford	53–25	58–20	42–36	43–35	46–32	60–18		44–34	–	58–20	–
Reading	40–38	54–24	39–39	46–32	39–39	38–40	35–43		39–39	43–35	36–42
Sheffield	47–30	49–29	40–38	39–39	44–34	53–25	29–49	37–41		55–23	47–31
Swindon	44–34	42–35	42–36	39–39	41–37	36–42	21–56	49–28	36–41		36–41
Wolverhampton	49–29	49–29	40–38	33–45	41–37	51–27	33–45	46–32	44–34	49–29	

Legend: Blue = home team win; Yellow = draw; Red = away team win.

== British League Knockout Cup ==
The 1986 Speedway Star British League Knockout Cup was the 48th edition of the Knockout Cup for tier one teams. Oxford Cheetahs and Cradley Heath Heathens were declared joint winners because the second leg of the final was not held and the first leg had ended 39-39.

First round

Date	Team one	Score	Team two
21/07	Reading	53-25	Kings Lynn
19/07	Swindon	47-31	Ipswich
17/07	Ipswich	38-40	Swindon
05/07	Kings Lynn	43-35	Reading
21/05	Cradley Heath	46-32	Belle Vue
03/05	Belle Vue	45-33	Cradley Heath

Quarter-finals

Date	Team one	Score	Team two
29/09	Reading	45-33	Cradley Heath
24/09	Cradley Heath	50-28	Reading
17/09	Coventry	43-34	Sheffield
17/09	Oxford	48-30	Swindon
07/09	Swindon	37-41	Oxford
26/06	Sheffield	44-34	Coventry
24/06	Bradford	45-33	Wolverhampton
02/06	Wolverhampton	38-40	Bradford

Semi-finals

Date	Team one	Score	Team two
10/10	Oxford	45-33	Sheffield
15/10	Cradley Heath	50-28	Bradford
16/10	Sheffield	33-45	Oxford
27/10	Bradford	+	Cradley Heath

+2nd leg not held and Bradford conceded tie

=== Final ===
The title was shared after two failed attempts to hold the second leg due to rain.

First and only leg

1 November 1986

Cradley Heath Jan O. Pedersen 8 Phil Collins 8 Erik Gundersen 7 Nigel Leaver 6 Steve Bastable 4 Paul Fry 3 Simon Cross 3	39 - 39	Oxford Cheetahs Hans Nielsen 14 Simon Wigg 9 Marvyn Cox 9 Nigel De'ath 4 Per Sorensen 1 Andy Grahame 1 Jon Surman 1

Dudley Wood Stadium

== League Cup ==
The League Cup was contested as a league format. The cup was shared following two failed attempts to stage the second leg of the final at Oxford due to rain. Oxford had won the first leg at Cradley Heath 40–38.

Qualifying table

Pos	Team	PL	W	D	L	Pts
1	Coventry Bees	20	14	1	5	37
2	Oxford Cheetahs	20	13	1	6	36
3	Ipswich Witches	20	12	1	7	30
4	Cradley Heathens	20	10	2	8	29
5	Swindon Robins	20	9	3	8	27
6	Sheffield Tigers	20	10	2	8	27
7	Bradford Dukes	20	9	3	8	26
8	Reading Racers	20	10	0	10	24
9	Wolverhampton Wolves	20	6	1	13	17
10	Belle Vue Aces	20	6	2	12	17
11	King's Lynn Stars	20	2	2	16	6

Results

Home \ Away	BV	BRA	COV	CH	IPS	KL	OX	RR	SHE	SWI	WOL
Belle Vue		38–40	38–39	46–32	32–46	47–31	33–45	46–32	39–39	39–39	49–29
Bradford	41–37		35–43	39–39	39–39	49–29	36–42	50–28	44–34	47–31	52–26
Coventry	44–33	45–33		43–35	44–34	46–32	42–36	46–32	46–32	46–32	44–34
Cradley Heath	44–34	41–37	41–37		41–37	57–20	38–40	42–36	43–35	42–36	44–34
Ipswich	43–35	39–37	44–34	40–38		46–31	39–38	43–35	47–31	40–38	44–34
King's Lynn	47–31	39–39	38–40	39–39	32–46		38–40	37–41	36–42	35–43	40–38
Oxford	36–42	43–35	35–43	40–37	44–34	45–33		42–33	46–32	40–38	43–35
Reading	54–24	41–37	47–31	42–36	40–38	49–29	40–38		31–40	40–38	46–32
Sheffield	35–43	36–42	48–30	40–38	45–33	56–22	38–40	43–35		43–35	41–37
Swindon	52–26	53–25	45–33	41–37	41–37	44–34	39–39	46–32	39–39		49–29
Wolverhampton	53–25	37–41	39–39	34–44	46–32	48–30	40–38	40–38	36–42	43–35	

Legend: Blue = home team win; Yellow = draw; Red = away team win.

Semi-finals

Team one	Team two	Scores
Coventry	Cradley Heath	39–39, 37–41
Oxford	Ipswich	40–38, 42–34

Final (First and only leg)

18 October 1986

Cradley Heath Erik Gundersen 11 Phil Collins 7 Simon Cross 6 Jan O. Pedersen 5 Steve Bastable 5 Nigel Leaver 2 Paul Fry 2	38 - 40	Oxford Cheetahs Hans Nielsen 11 Marvyn Cox 10 Simon Wigg 9 Per Sorensen 4 Nigel De'ath 4 Andy Grahame 2 Jon Surman 0

Dudley Wood Stadium

== Riders' Championship ==
Hans Nielsen won the British League Riders' Championship, held at Hyde Road on 12 October.

Pos.	Rider	Heat Scores	Total
1	(Denmark) Hans Nielsen	3 3 3 3 3	15
2	(Denmark) Erik Gundersen	2 3 3 2 1	11+3
3	(United States) Shawn Moran	3 3 1 2 2	11+2
4	(England) Chris Morton	3 2 3 0 3	11+1
5	(Sweden) Jan Andersson	2 3 3 1 2	11
6	(England) Simon Wigg	1 0 2 3 3	9
7	(Denmark) Tommy Knudsen	0 2 2 3 1	8
8	(Denmark) Jan O. Pedersen	2 2 0 1 3	8
9	(Denmark) John Jørgensen	3 2 2 1 0	8
10	(England) Jeremy Doncaster	0 1 2 3 2	8
11	(England) Alan Grahame	1 0 1 2 2	6
12	(England) John Davis	2 1 1 0 1	5
13	(Denmark) Preben Eriksen	1 1 0 0 1	3
14	(England) Andy Campbell	0 1 1 1 0	3
15	(England) Neil Evitts	1 0 0 2 0	3
16	(Finland) Kai Niemi	0 0 0 0 -	0
17	(England) Lee Edwards (res)	0 - - - -	0

- ef=engine failure, f=fell, x=excluded r-retired

== Pairs ==
The British League Pairs Championship was held at Owlerton Stadium on 24 August and was won by Oxford for the second consecutive year.

Pos	Team	Pts	Riders
1	Oxford	25	Wigg 15, Nielsen 10
2	Coventry	22	Tatum 13, Jorgensen 9
3	Sheffield	18	Moran S 11, Collins N 7
4	Belle Vue	18	Morton 17, Collins P 1
5	Bradford	16	King 9, Evitts 7
6	Cradley Heath	16	Gundersen 14, Pedersen 2
7	Ipswich	11	Niemi 8, Doncaster 3

== Leading final averages ==
Rider	Team	Average
(Denmark) Hans Nielsen	Oxford	11.57
(Denmark) Erik Gundersen	Cradley Heath	11.03
(England) Jeremy Doncaster	Ipswich	10.38
(England) Simon Wigg	Oxford	10.20
(England) Kenny Carter+	Bradford	10.05
(United States) Sam Ermolenko	Wolverhampton	9.72
(Denmark) Tommy Knudsen	Coventry	9.68
(United States) Shawn Moran	Sheffield	9.65
(England) Chris Morton	Belle Vue	9.34
(Sweden) Jan Andersson	Reading	9.34
(England) Neil Evitts	Bradford	9.32
(United States) Bobby Schwartz	Kings Lynn	9.06

+rode 10 matches before his death

== Midland Cup ==
Oxford won the Midland Cup for the second consecutive year. The competition consisted of six teams.

First round

Team one	Team two	Score
Swindon	Wolverhampton	39–39, 27–51
Reading	Coventry	40–38, 26–52

Semi final round

Team one	Team two	Score
Oxford	Wolverhampton	42–36, 39–39
Cradley	Coventry	41–37, 35–43

Final

First leg

25 October 1986

Coventry Tommy Knudsen 11 John Jorgensen 10 Kelvin Tatum 8 Alun Rossiter 6 Rick Miller 5 David Bargh 3 David Clarke 1	44–34	Oxford Simon Wigg 13 Jeremy Doncaster (guest) 7 Per Sorensen 6 Marvyn Cox 5 Nigel De'ath 2 Andy Grahame 1 Jon Surman 0

Brandon Stadium

Second leg

29 October 1986

Oxford Hans Nielsen 11 Simon Wigg 10 Marvyn Cox 10 Per Sorensen 6 Nigel De'ath 4 Andy Grahame 3 Jon Surman 2	46–32	Coventry Rick Miller 14 Alun Rossiter 9 Kelvin Tatum 6 David Bargh 1 Tommy Knudsen 1 (ill) David Clarke 1 John Jorgensen r/r

Oxford Stadium

Oxford won on aggregate 80–76

== Riders & final averages ==
Belle Vue

- (England) Chris Morton 9.34
- (England) Carl Blackbird 7.37
- (England) Peter Collins 6.93
- (Scotland) Kenny McKinna 6.48
- (England) Andy Smith 6.10
- (England) Mark Courtney 5.43
- (England) Declan Eccles 4.28
- (England) Mark Crang 2.67
- (England) Barry Ayres 2.65
- (England) Bernie Collier 1.60
- (England) Lee Edwards 1.06

Bradford

- (England) Kenny Carter 10.05
- (England) Neil Evitts 9.32
- (United States) Lance King 8.20
- (England) Gary Havelock 7.26
- (England) Sean Willmott 6.30
- (New Zealand) Larry Ross 6.01
- (England) Gordon Whitaker 4.16
- (England) Michael Graves 3.88

Coventry

- (Denmark) Tommy Knudsen 9.68
- (Denmark) John Jørgensen 8.74
- (England) Kelvin Tatum 8.69
- (United States) Rick Miller 6.41
- (New Zealand) David Bargh 5.68
- (England) Alun Rossiter 5.60
- (England) David Clarke 3.50
- (England) Mike Bacon 1.71

Cradley Heath

- (Denmark) Erik Gundersen 11.03
- (Denmark) Jan O. Pedersen 8.58
- (England) Phil Collins 7.80
- (England) Simon Cross 7.17
- (England) Steve Bastable 6.08
- (England) Nigel Leaver 3.74
- (England) Paul Fry 3.23
- (England) Paul Taylor 2.06

Ipswich

- (England) Jeremy Doncaster 10.38
- (Finland) Kai Niemi 8.00
- (England) Richard Knight 7.79
- (Denmark) Jens Rasmussen 5.69
- (England) Louis Carr 4.90
- (England) Paul Woods 4.71
- (Czech Republic) Roman Matoušek 4.57
- (England) Robbie Fuller 4.17
- (England) Alan Farmer 3.79

King's Lynn

- (United States) Bobby Schwartz 9.06
- (England) Michael Lee 7.74
- (England) Malcolm Simmons 6.73
- (England) Andy Campbell 5.38
- (Norway) Einar Kyllingstad 4.91
- (Australia) Steve Regeling 4.70
- (Australia) Stephen Davies 4.60
- (England) Ray Morton 4.21
- (England) Carl Baldwin 4.15
- (England) Adrian Stevens 2.28
- (England) John Stokes 1.11

Oxford

- (Denmark) Hans Nielsen 11.57
- (England) Simon Wigg 10.20
- (England) Marvyn Cox 8.11
- (England) Andy Grahame 6.14
- (Denmark) Per Sorensen 6.05
- (England) Nigel De'ath 5.34
- (England) Kevin Smart 4.33
- (England) Jon Surman 2.43

Reading

- (Sweden) Jan Andersson 9.34
- (England) John Davis 8.72
- (New Zealand) Mitch Shirra 7.90
- (Sweden) Per Jonsson 7.36
- (Denmark) Peter Glanz 5.89
- (England) Malcolm Holloway 5.47
- (England) Dave Mullett 5.33
- (England) Gary Tagg 1.35
- (England) Billy Pinder 1.27

Sheffield

- (United States) Shawn Moran 9.65
- (United States) Kelly Moran 8.76
- (England) Neil Collins 7.89
- (England) Peter Carr 7.53
- (England) Les Collins 7.24
- (England) Sean Wilson 5.83
- (England) Martin Hagon 5.46
- (England) David Walsh 4.62
- (England) Peter McNamara 3.27

Swindon

- (Australia) Phil Crump 8.77
- (Finland) Kai Niemi 8.45
- (Sweden) Jimmy Nilsen 7.82
- (Sweden) Richard Hellsen 6.79
- (England) Alan Grahame 6.64
- (Denmark) Finn Thomsen 6.07
- (Denmark) Per Sorensen 5.16
- (Denmark) Brian Karger 4.58
- (England) Rob Fortune 3.16

Wolverhampton

- (United States) Sam Ermolenko 9.72
- (Denmark) Preben Eriksen 7.70
- (Denmark) John Eskildsen 7.04
- (Denmark) Sam Nikolajsen 6.18
- (Denmark) Jan Stæchmann 5.23
- (England) Andy Phillips 2.97
- (England) Chris Cobby 1.07

== See also ==
- List of United Kingdom Speedway League Champions
- Knockout Cup (speedway)
