= 1992 Danish speedway season =

Season of speedway in Denmark

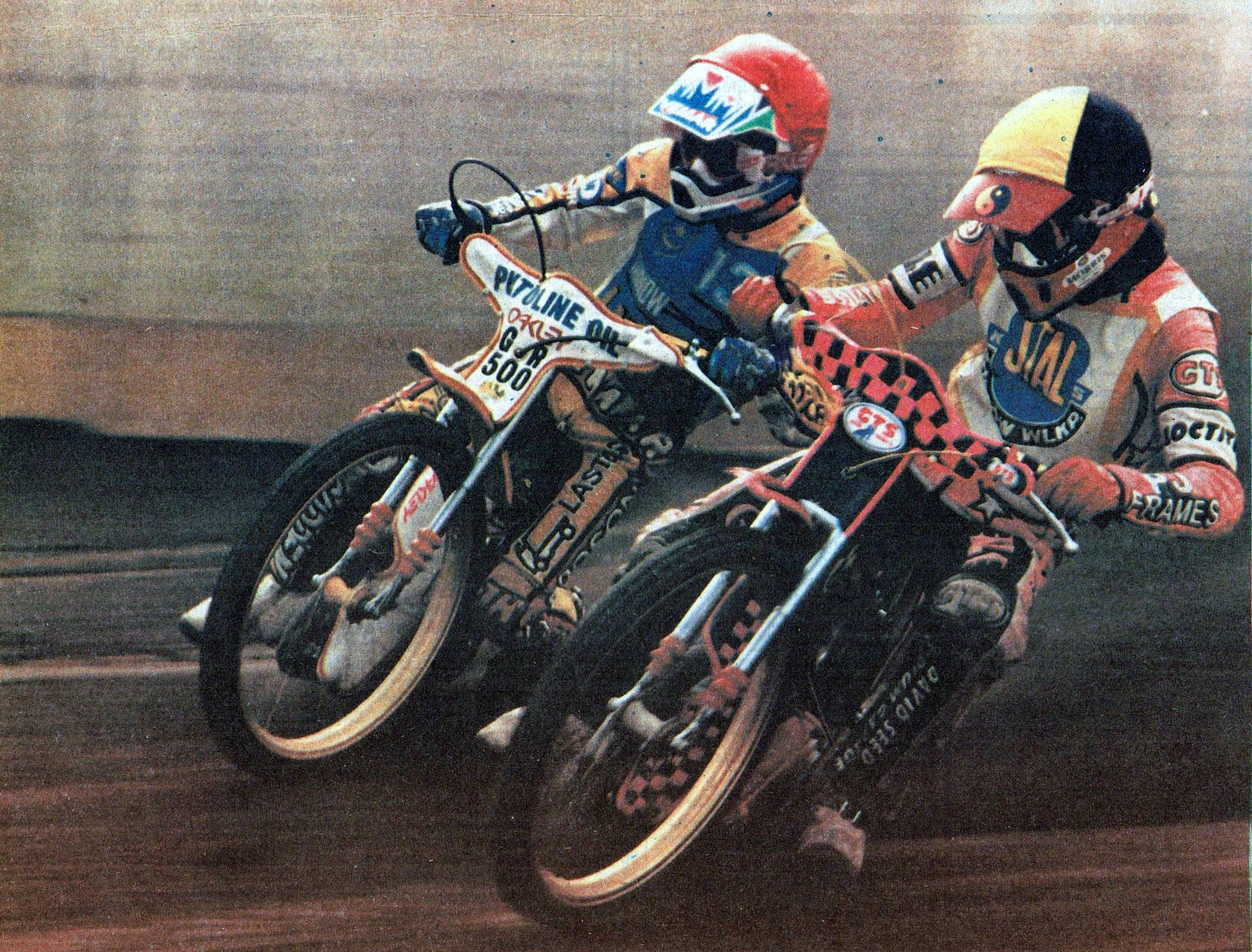
- Gert Handberg (left) became the Danish champion

The 1992 Danish speedway season was the 1992 season of motorcycle speedway in Denmark.

== Individual ==
=== Individual Championship ===
The 1992 Danish Individual Speedway Championship was the 1992 edition of the Danish Individual Speedway Championship. The final was held over two rounds at Uhre on 16 May and at Holsted on 17 May. The title was won by Gert Handberg.

Five riders from the Danish final would progress to the Nordic Final as part of the 1992 Individual Speedway World Championship.

Final

Pos.	Rider	Scores	Total	Race off
1	Gert Handberg	Holsted	14,13	27
2	Brian Karger	Fredericia	11,12	23+3
3	John Jørgensen	Fjelsted	11,12	23+2
4	Tommy Knudsen	Fredericia	9,12	21
5	Claus Jacobsen	Holstebro	9,10	19+3
6	Peter Ravn	Randers	10,9	19+2
7	Allan Johansen	Holsted	8,10	18
8	Brian Andersen	Fredericia	9,9	18
9	Bo Skov Eriksen	Holsted	8,3	11
10	Jan Stæchmann	Holsted	1,9	10
11	Jan Andersen	Fredericia	5,5	10
12	Tom P. Knudsen	Holstebro	5,4	9
13	Jan Pedersen	Vissenbjerg	4,4	8
14	Hans Clausen	Holsted	4,4	8
15	Lars Henrik Jørgensen	Fjelsted	4,3	4
16	René Madsen	Holsted	3,1	4
17	Jacob Olsen (res)	Fjelsted	4,0	4
18	Jens Peter Nielsen (res)	Randers	2,0	2

Key - Each heat has four riders, 3 points for a heat win, 2 for 2nd, 1 for third and 0 for last

=== Junior Championship ===
Ronni Pedersen won the Junior Championship.

== Team ==
=== Danish Superliga ===
The 1992 season was won by Fjelsted for the 3rd time. The team contained Jan O. Pedersen (who missed most of the season through injury and then retired), Billy Hamill, John Jørgensen, Ronni Pedersen, Jan Jakobsen, Lars Henrik Jørgensen, Morten Andersen and Jacob Olsen.

League table

Pos	Team	P	Pts
1	Fjelsted		
2	Holsted		
3	Fredericia		
4	Holstebro		
5	Slangerup		
6	Randers		
