= 1987 Individual Speedway World Championship =

Motorcycle speedway world championship season

Seasons
- ← 1986 1988 →

The 1987 Speedway World Final programme.

The 1987 Individual Speedway World Championship was the 42nd edition of the official World Championship to determine the world champion rider.

It was contested for the one and only time over two days in the Netherlands. The scores from both meetings were combined to produce the eventual winner.

With the chances of a surprise winner reduced due to two races being held it was the favourite Hans Nielsen that duly obliged with his second World crown. Nielsen had trailed after day one by 1 point to great rival Erik Gundersen and the American Sam Ermolenko. However, in trademark style Nielsen produced a 15-point maximum on day two to wrap up the World Title, with Gundersen claiming silver and Ermolenko bronze.

== First round ==
=== British preliminary round ===
- Top 32 riders to British semi-finals

Date	Venue	Winner	2nd	3rd
Preliminary Round
5 April	Arlington Stadium, Eastbourne	Andy Galvin	Malcolm Holloway	Martin Dugard
5 April	Mildenhall Stadium, Mildenhall	Alan Mogridge	Melvyn Taylor	Martin Goodwin
11 April	Loomer Road Stadium, Chesterton	Nigel Crabtree	Martin Yeates	Doug Wyer
16 April	Cleveland Park Stadium, Middlesbrough	Gary Havelock	Martin Dixon	Les Collins
24 April	East of England Arena, Peterborough	Andrew Silver	Trevor Banks	Ian Barney
Quarter-Final
4 May	Brough Park, Newcastle	Andrew Silver	Ian Barney	David Blackburn

== Second round ==
=== British semi-finals ===
- Top 16 riders to British semi-finals

- 17 May
- (England) Abbey Stadium, Swindon
- Top 8 to British final

Pos.	Rider	Points
1	Jeremy Doncaster	15
2	Marvyn Cox	12
3	Andy Grahame	10
4	Simon Cross	10
5	Alun Rossiter	9
6	Kelvin Tatum	9
7	Andrew Silver	9
8	John Davis	8+3
9	Steve Bastable	8+2
10	Melvyn Taylor	7
11	David Blackburn	5
12	Richard Knight	5
13	Malcolm Simmons	5
14	Sean Wilson	3
15	Andy Campbell	2
16	Doug Wyer	1
17	Matthew Cross (res)	1

- 17 May
- (England) Owlerton Stadium, Sheffield
- Top 8 to British final

Pos.	Rider	Points
1	Simon Wigg	12+3
2	Neil Evitts	12+2
3	Neil Collins	12+1
4	Paul Thorp	10
5	Andy Smith	10
6	Chris Morton	10
7	Gary Havelock	9
8	Peter Carr	9
9	Les Collins	8
10	Ian Barney	5
11	Kenny McKinna	5
12	Trevor Banks	4
13	Andy Galvin	4
14	Carl Blackbird	4
15	Sean Willmott	3
16	Alan Grahame	3

== Third round ==
=== Continental preliminary round ===
Date	Venue	Winner	2nd	3rd
1 May	(West Germany) Pfaffenhofen Speedwaybahn, Pfaffenhofen	(Czechoslovakia) Bohumil Brhel	(Poland) Ryszard Francsyszyn	(Soviet Union) Vladimir Voronkov
17 May	(Socialist Federal Republic of Yugoslavia) Matija Gubec Stadium, Krško	(Italy) Valentino Furlanetto	(Czechoslovakia) Lubomir Jedek	(Italy) Gianni Famari
17 May	(West Germany) Anton Treffer Stadion, Neustadt Donau	(Hungary) Antal Kocso	(Poland) Andrzej Huszcza	(Hungary) Laszlo Bodi
17 May	(Bulgaria) Speedway Stadium, Targovishte	(Poland) Grzegorz Dzikowski	(Hungary) Josef Sereš	(Poland) Dariusz Baliński

=== Swedish qualification ===
- Top 8 in each heat to Swedish final

(3 May, Nässjö Motorstadion, Nässjö)
Pos	Rider	Points
1	Jan Andersson	13+3
2	Per Jonsson	13+2
3	Mikael Blixt	12
4	Johan Staaf	11
5	Roland Dannö	11
6	Dennis Löfqvist	10
7	Tony Olsson	10
8	Claes Ivarsson	8
9	Thomas Ek	7
10	Pierre Brannefors	6
11	Jörgen Johansson	6
12	Lennart Bengtsson	6
13	Tony Gudbrand	2
14	Patrik Olsson	2
15	Leif Jonsson	2
16	Anders Kling	1

(3 May, Motorbanen Hagalund, Lindesberg)
Pos	Rider	Points
1	Tommy Nilsson	13
2	Erik Stenlund	11
3	Niklas Karlsson	11
4	Conny Ivarsson	10
5	Patrik Karlsson	10
6	Bo Arrhén	9
7	Christer Rohlén	9
8	Lillebror Johansson	9
9	Kenneth Nyström	8
10	Mikael Ritterwall	8
11	Peter Nahlin	7
12	Börje Ring	4
13	Lars Andersson	4
14	Mikael Teurnberg	3
15	Mikael Messing	3
16	Anders Condé	1

=== British Final ===
- 31 May 1987
- (England) Brandon Stadium, Coventry
- Top 9 to Commonwealth Final plus 1 reserve

Placing	Rider	Total	1	2	3	4	5	6	7	8	9	10	11	12	13	14	15	16	17	18	19	20	Pts	Pos	21	22
1	(England) (11) Kelvin Tatum	13			3				3		2					3						2	13	1		
2	(England) (2) Neil Evitts	11	3					1				2				2				3			11	2		
3	(England) (14) Simon Wigg	10				3		2					3		1							1	10	3		3
4	(England) (13) Marvyn Cox	10				2	2							2		1					3		10	4		2
5	(England) (12) Jeremy Doncaster	9			0					3		3			3						0		9	5		
6	(England) (5) Paul Thorp	9		F			3					X					3					3	9	6		
7	(England) (15) Andrew Silver	9				1			2			1						2	3				9	7		
8	(England) (6) Simon Cross	8		3				3			1							F			1		8	8		
9	(England) (3) Chris Morton	8	1						1				2				2				2		8	9		
10	(England) (4) John Davis	7	0							1				3				3				0	7	10		
11	(England) (1) Andy Grahame	6	2				0				3				0				1				6	11		
12	(England) (10) Gary Havelock	6			2			0						1			1		2				6	12		
13	(England) (8) Andy Smith	5		2						2			0			1			F				5	13		
14	(England) (7) Peter Carr	4		1					0					0	2					1			4	14		
15	(England) (9) Alun Rossiter	4			1		1						1					1		0			4	15		
16	(England) (16) Neil Collins	2				0				0	0						0			2			2	16		
TR	(England) (TR) David Clarke	0										0											0	TR		
Placing	Rider	Total	1	2	3	4	5	6	7	8	9	10	11	12	13	14	15	16	17	18	19	20	Pts	Pos	21	22

m - exclusion for exceeding two minute time allowance • t - exclusion for touching the tapes • x - other exclusion • e - retired or mechanical failure • f - fell • ns - non-starter • nc - non-classify

gate A - inside	gate B	gate C	gate D - outside

=== Australian Final ===
- 24 January 1987
- (Australia) Olympic Park, Mildura
- First 4 to Commonwealth Final

Pos.	Rider	Total
1	Steve Regeling	14
2	Steve Baker	12
3	Glyn Taylor	10
4	Ashley Norton	10
5	Craig Hodgson	10
6	Mick Poole	9
7	David Jackson	9
8	Tony Butler	8
9	Tony Rose	8
10	Stephen Davies	7
11	David Cheshire	6
12	Mark Fiora	4
13	Andy Barret	4
14	Nigel Adlerton	3
15	Chris Watson	2
16	Nigel Tramelling	2

=== New Zealand Final ===
- 21 February 1987
- (New Zealand) Western Springs Stadium, Auckland
- Top 3 riders + 1 reserve to Commonwealth Final

Pos.	Rider	Total
1	David Bargh	14
2	Mitch Shirra	13
3	Larry Ross	12
4	Alan Mason	10
5	Mike Fullerton	10
6	Richard Price	9
7	Mark Long	8
8	Chris Martin	8
9	Steve Rose	8
10	John Roberts	6
11	Mark Lyndon	6
12	Chris Monk	5
13	Les Chappell	4
14	Don Hopewell	3
15	Dave Cotton	2

== Fourth round ==
=== Continental quarter-finals ===
- Top 32 to Continental semi-finals

Date	Venue	Winner	2nd	3rd
24 May	(Austria) Stadion Wiener Neustadt	(Hungary) József Petrikovics	(Italy) Armando Castagna	(Austria) Toni Pilotto
31 May	(Hungary) Hajdú Volán Stadion, Debrecen	(Soviet Union) Mikhail Starostin	(Soviet Union) Viktor Kuznetsov	(Hungary) Zoltan Adorjan
31 May	(Soviet Union) Rivne Speedway Stadium, Rivne	(Czechoslovakia) Roman Matoušek	(Czechoslovakia) Jiří Svoboda	(Soviet Union) Valery Gordeev
31 May	(Czechoslovakia) Slaný Speedway Stadium, Slaný	(Czechoslovakia) Antonín Kasper, Jr.	(West Germany) Gerd Riss	(West Germany) Karl Maier

=== Commonwealth Final ===
- 14 June 1987
- (England) Hyde Road, Manchester
- First 11 to the Overseas Final

Placing	Rider	Total	1	2	3	4	5	6	7	8	9	10	11	12	13	14	15	16	17	18	19	20	Pts	Pos	21
1	(England) (4) Kelvin Tatum	14	3							2				3				3				3	14	1	
2	(England) (12) Simon Cross	13			3					3		3			3						1		13	2	
3	(England) (14) Marvyn Cox	10				3		3					3		1							0	10	3	
4	(England) (10) Neil Evitts	10			2			1						1			3		3				10	4	
5	(England) (3) Chris Morton	10	1						3				2				2				2		10	5	
6	(New Zealand) (11) David Bargh	10			1				2		2					3						2	10	6	
7	(New Zealand) (13) Mitch Shirra	10				1	2							2		2					3		10	7	
8	(Australia) (16) Steve Regeling	8				2				1	1						1			3			8	8	
9	(England) (2) Andrew Silver	8	2					2				2				E				2			8	9	
10	(England) (5) Paul Thorp	7		3			3					F					0					1	7	10	
11	(England) (7) Jeremy Doncaster	6		2					1					0	2					1			6	11	3
12	(England) (6) Simon Wigg	6		1				0			3							2			0		6	12	2
13	(Australia) (9) Steve Baker	3			0		1						1					1		0			3	13	
14	(Australia) (15) Glyn Taylor	3				X			0			1						0	2				3	14	
15	(New Zealand) (1) Alan Mason	1	0				0				0				0				1				1	15	
16	(Australia) (8) Ashley Norton	1		E						0			1			0			0				1	16	
R1	(New Zealand) (R1) Larry Ross	0																					0	R1	
R2	(England) (R2) Glenn Hornby	0				0																	0	R2	
Placing	Rider	Total	1	2	3	4	5	6	7	8	9	10	11	12	13	14	15	16	17	18	19	20	Pts	Pos	21

m - exclusion for exceeding two minute time allowance • t - exclusion for touching the tapes • x - other exclusion • e - retired or mechanical failure • f - fell • ns - non-starter • nc - non-classify

gate A - inside	gate B	gate C	gate D - outside

=== American Final ===
- 13 June 1987
- (United States) Veterans Memorial Stadium, Long Beach
- Top 5 to Overseas Final

Pos.	Rider	Heat Scores	Total
1	Sam Ermolenko	3,4,4,4,4	19
2	Kelly Moran	4,4,3,4,3	18
3	John Cook	4,2,4,3,2	15+4
4	Robert Pfetzing	4,4,4,2,2	15+3
5	Mike Faria	2,4,3,4,2	15+2
6	Lance King	4,2,3,2,4	15+1
7	Rick Miller	3,3,2,4,3	15+0
8	Shawn Moran	3,0,4,3,4	14
9	Bobby Schwartz	0,4,2,3,3	12
10	Gary Hicks	2,1,1,3,4	11
11	Steve Lucero	1,3,3,2,1	10
12	John Sandona	1,3,2,0,3	8
13	Jim Sisemore	2,0,1,2,3	8
14	Brad Oxley	3,1,1,1,1	7
15	Eddie Ingels	2,1,2,0,0	5
16	Mark Dwyer	1,2,0,1,1	5
17	Tuff McBridge	1,2,1,1,F	5
18	John Kehoe	0,1,0,0,1	2
19	Gary Ford	0,0,0,1,0	1
20	Bart Bast	0,0,0,0,0	0

=== Swedish Finals ===
- (Sweden) Top 4 + 1 reserve (+ Jimmy Nilsen, seeded) to Nordic Final
- R1 (19 May, Grevby Motorstadion, Mariestad)
- R2 (20 May, Snälltorpet, Eskilstuna)
- R3 (21 May, Vetlanda Motorstadion, Vetlanda)

Pos.	Rider	R1	R2	R3	Total
1	Jan Andersson	15	14	14	43
2	Per Jonsson	14	15	13	42
3	Roland Danno	9	11	11	31
4	Tommy Nilsson	8	12	10	30
5	Patrik Karlsson	10	8	11	29
6	Conny Ivarsson	9	9	9	27
7	Christer Rohlen	7	10	8	25
8	Niklas Karlsson	8	3	10	21
9	Tony Olsson	6	9	5	20
10	Dennis Löfqvist	7	6	3	16
11	Jan Staan	3	5	5	13
12	Bo Arhhen	2	8	2	12
13	Claes Ivarsson	3	1	7	11
14	Kenneth Nystrom	3	6	0	9
15	Erik Stenlund	6	2	-	8
16	Lillebror Johansson	3	1	3	7
17	Mikael Blixt	6	1	-	7
18	Pierre Brannefors	-	0	7	7
19	Mikael Rittewall	-	-	1	1
16	Jorgen Johansson	-	-	0	0

=== Finnish Final ===
(Finland) 2 riders selected for Nordic Final

=== Norway Final ===
(Norway) 2 riders selected for Nordic Final

=== Danish Final ===
- 17 May 1987
- (Denmark) Slangerup Speedway Center, Slangerup
- First 6 + Jan O Pedersen (seeded) to the Nordic Final

Placing	Rider	Total	1	2	3	4	5	6	7	8	9	10	11	12	13	14	15	16	17	18	19	20	Pts	Pos	21
1	(Denmark) (7) Hans Nielsen	15		3					3					3	3					3			15	1	
2	(Denmark) (15) Erik Gundersen	13				3			1			3						3	3				13	2	
3	(Denmark) (13) John Jørgensen	11				1	3							2		2					3		11	3	
4	(Denmark) (5) Jan Jakobsen	11		2			2					2					3					2	11	4	
5	(Denmark) (14) Tommy Knudsen	10				2		3					3		2							-	10	5	
6	(Denmark) (4) Peter Ravn	10	2							3				1				1				3	10	6	
7	(Denmark) (11) Jens Rasmussen	9			3				2		2					1						1	9	7	
8	(Denmark) (2) Per Sorensen	7	1					1				0				3				2			7	8	
9	(Denmark) (9) Peter Glanz	7			2		1						2					2		0			7	9	
10	(Denmark) (10) Fleming Rasmussen	6			1			2						0			1		2				6	10	
11	(Denmark) (12) John Eskilden	5			0					2		1			1						1		5	11	
12	(Denmark) (1) Kurt Hansen	4	3				0				0				0				1				4	12	
13	(Denmark) (16) Aksel Jepsen	4				0				0	1						2			1			4	13	
14	(Denmark) (6) Frank Andersen	3		0				0			3							0			-		3	14	
15	(Denmark) (8) Ole Hansen	3		1						1			1			0			0				3	15	
16	(Denmark) (3) Sam Nikolajsen	2	0						0				0				0				2		2	16	
Placing	Rider	Total	1	2	3	4	5	6	7	8	9	10	11	12	13	14	15	16	17	18	19	20	Pts	Pos	21

m - exclusion for exceeding two minute time allowance • t - exclusion for touching the tapes • x - other exclusion • e - retired or mechanical failure • f - fell • ns - non-starter • nc - non-classify

gate A - inside	gate B	gate C	gate D - outside

== Fifth round ==
=== Continental semi-finals ===
- 13 June
- (Poland) Alfred Smoczyk Stadium, Leszno
- Top 8 to Continental final

Pos.	Rider	Points
1	(Poland) Roman Jankowski	14
2	(Poland) Wojciech Zabialowicz	13
3	(Hungary) Zoltán Adorján	11+3
4	(Soviet Union) Vladimir Trofimov	11+2
5	(Czechoslovakia) Roman Matoušek	10
6	(Soviet Union) Michail Starostin	10
7	(Hungary) Sandor Tihanyi	9
8	(Poland) Janusz Stachyra	8
9	(Soviet Union) Viktor Kuznetsov	7
10	(Soviet Union) Valerij Gordeev	6
11	(Czechoslovakia) Zdeněk Schneiderwind	6
12	(Poland) Grzegorz Dzikowski	5
13	(Italy) Gianni Famari	5
14	(Italy) Giorgio Zaramella	3
15	(Czechoslovakia) Jiří Svoboda	2
16	(Czechoslovakia) Zdeněk Tesař	0
17	(Czechoslovakia) Josef Fejfar (res)	0

- 14 June
- (West Germany) Breitenthal Speedway Stadium, Krumbach
- Top 8 to Continental final

Pos.	Rider	Points
1	(West Germany) Gerd Riss	14
2	(Italy) Armando Castagna	13
3	(Czechoslovakia) Antonín Kasper Jr.	11+3
4	(Czechoslovakia) Petr Vandírek	11+2
5	(Italy) Armando Dal Chiele	10
6	(West Germany) Karl Maier	9
7	(Poland) Jan Krzystyniak	9
8	(Hungary) Antal Kocso	8
9	(Austria) Toni Pilotto	6
10	(Poland) Ryszard Franczyszyn	6
11	(Hungary) Janos Balogh	5
12	(Poland) Andrzej Huszcza	4
13	(Hungary) Zoltan Hajdu	4
14	(Poland) Dariusz Stenka	4
15	(Hungary) József Petrikovics	3
16	(West Germany) Michael Datzmann	3
17	(Czechoslovakia) Bohumil Brhel	0
18	(Austria) Heinrich Schatzer (res)	0

=== Overseas Final ===
- 5 July 1987
- (England) Odsal Stadium, Bradford
- First 10 to the Intercontinental Final plus 1 reserve

Placing	Rider	Total	1	2	3	4	5	6	7	8	9	10	11	12	13	14	15	16	17	18	19	20	Pts	Pos	21
1	(New Zealand) (7) Mitch Shirra	12		3					0					3	3					3			12	1	
2	(England) (11) Jeremy Doncaster	11			3				2		2					3						1	11	2	
3	(United States) (14) Kelly Moran	10				3		2					2		1							2	10	3	3
4	(United States) (12) Sam Ermolenko	10			0					2		3			2						3		10	4	2
5	(Australia) (6) Steve Regeling	9		2				0			3							3			1		9	5	
6	(England) (10) Simon Cross	9			2			3						2			2		0				9	6	
7	(England) (1) Neil Evitts	8	3				1				1				0				3				8	7	
8	(England) (8) Marvyn Cox	8		0						3			3			1			1				8	8	
9	(United States) (13) John Cook	8				1	2							1		2					2		8	9	
10	(England) (3) Chris Morton	7	2						1				1				3				X		7	10	3
11	(England) (15) Kelvin Tatum	7				0			3			0						2	2				7	11	2
12	(New Zealand) (4) David Bargh	6	1							1				X				1				3	6	12	
13	(United States) (5) Robert Pfetzing	5		1			3					1					0					0	5	13	
14	(United States) (16) Mike Faria	5				2				0	0						1			2			5	14	
15	(England) (2) Paul Thorp	3	0					1				2				0				E			3	15	
16	(England) (9) Andrew Silver	2			1		0						0					0		1			2	16	
Placing	Rider	Total	1	2	3	4	5	6	7	8	9	10	11	12	13	14	15	16	17	18	19	20	Pts	Pos	21

m - exclusion for exceeding two minute time allowance • t - exclusion for touching the tapes • x - other exclusion • e - retired or mechanical failure • f - fell • ns - non-starter • nc - non-classify

gate A - inside	gate B	gate C	gate D - outside

=== Nordic Final ===
- 14 June 1987
- (Sweden) Norrköping Motorstadion, Norrköping
- First 7 to the Intercontinental Final plus 1 reserve

Placing	Rider	Total	1	2	3	4	5	6	7	8	9	10	11	12	13	14	15	16	17	18	19	20	Pts	Pos	21
1	(Denmark) (2) Erik Gundersen	14	3					2				3				3				3			14	1	
2	(Denmark) (14) Hans Nielsen	12				3		3					3		1							2	12	2	3
3	(Denmark) (12) Peter Ravn	12			3					2		2			2						3		12	3	2
4	(Sweden) (4) Per Jonsson	11	1							3				3				1				3	11	4	
5	(Denmark) (9) Jan O. Pedersen	11			2		3						2					2		2			11	5	
6	(Sweden) (6) Jimmy Nilsen	10		2				1			3							3			1		10	6	
7	(Finland) (1) Kai Niemi	9	2				1				0				3				3				9	7	3
8	(Denmark) (8) John Jørgensen	9		3						1			1			2			2				9	8	2
9	(Sweden) (16) Jan Andersson	8				2				0	2						3			1			8	9	
10	(Denmark) (11) Tommy Knudsen	7			1				3		1					1						1	7	10	
11	(Sweden) (5) Roland Danno	6		1			2					1					2					0	6	11	
12	(Denmark) (3) Jan Jacobsen	4	E						1				0				1				2		4	12	
13	(Sweden) (7) Tommy Nilsson	3		F					2					1	0					0			3	13	
14	(Finland) (15) Olli Tyrväinen	2				1			0			0						0	1				2	14	
15	(Norway) (13) Arne Svendsen	0				0	0							0		0					0		0	15	
16	(Norway) (10) Einar Kyllingstad	0			F			0						X			F		0				0	16	
R1	(Finland) (R1) Vesa Ylinen	2												2									2	R1	
Placing	Rider	Total	1	2	3	4	5	6	7	8	9	10	11	12	13	14	15	16	17	18	19	20	Pts	Pos	21

m - exclusion for exceeding two minute time allowance • t - exclusion for touching the tapes • x - other exclusion • e - retired or mechanical failure • f - fell • ns - non-starter • nc - non-classify

gate A - inside	gate B	gate C	gate D - outside

== Sixth round ==
=== Сontinental Final ===
- 26 July 1987
- (Italy) Santa Marina Stadium, Lonigo
- First 4 to the World Final plus 1 reserve

Placing	Rider	Total	1	2	3	4	5	6	7	8	9	10	11	12	13	14	15	16	17	18	19	20	Pts	Pos	21
1	(West Germany) (1) Gerd Riss	13	3				3				1				3				3				13	1	3
2	(Poland) (11) Roman Jankowski	13			2				3		2					3						3	13	2	2
3	(Czechoslovakia) (8) Antonín Kasper, Jr.	11		2						3			2			2			2				11	3	3
4	(Czechoslovakia) (4) Roman Matoušek	11	1							2				3				3				2	11	4	2
5	(Soviet Union) (2) Vladimir Trofimov	10	2					3				2				1				2			10	5	3
6	(Italy) (7) Armando Dal Chiele	10		3					2					1	1					3			10	6	2
7	(Italy) (13) Armando Castagna	9				2	2							2		0					3		9	7	
8	(Poland) (6) Janusz Stachyra	9		1				2			3							2			1		9	8	
9	(Hungary) (9) Zoltan Adorjan	7			3		1						3					F		X			7	9	
10	(West Germany) (12) Karl Maier	6			E					1		1			2						2		6	10	
11	(Hungary) (5) Antal Kocso	5		F			0					3					2					E	5	11	
12	(Soviet Union) (16) Mikhail Starostin	4				3				0	X						1			E			4	12	
13	(Czechoslovakia) (14) Petr Vandirek	4				1		1					1		0							1	4	13	
14	(Poland) (3) Wojciech Żabiałowicz	3	0						0				0				3				0		3	14	
15	(Hungary) (15) Sandor Tihanyi	3				0			1			0						1	1				3	15	
16	(Poland) (10) Jan Krzystyniak	1			1			0						0			0		0				1	16	
Placing	Rider	Total	1	2	3	4	5	6	7	8	9	10	11	12	13	14	15	16	17	18	19	20	Pts	Pos	21

m - exclusion for exceeding two minute time allowance • t - exclusion for touching the tapes • x - other exclusion • e - retired or mechanical failure • f - fell • ns - non-starter • nc - non-classify

gate A - inside	gate B	gate C	gate D - outside

=== Intercontinental Final ===
- 27 July 1987
- (Denmark) Vojens Speedway Center, Vojens
- First 11 to the World Final plus 1 reserve

Placing	Rider	Total	1	2	3	4	5	6	7	8	9	10	11	12	13	14	15	16	17	18	19	20	Pts	Pos	21
1	(Denmark) (1) Erik Gundersen	13	3				3				3				1				3				13	1	
2	(Sweden) (11) Jimmy Nilsen	12			3				2		2					2						3	12	2	
3	(Denmark) (4) Hans Nielsen	11	0							3				3				3				2	11	3	
4	(Denmark) (3) Jan O. Pedersen	10	2						1				3				2				2		10	4	
5	(New Zealand) (2) Mitch Shirra	9	1					2				0				3				3			9	5	
6	(United States) (7) Sam Ermolenko	9		1					3					0	3					2			9	6	
7	(United States) (10) John Cook	9			1			3						1			3		1				9	7	
8	(Sweden) (5) Per Jonsson	8		3			1					3					0					1	8	8	
9	(England) (12) Simon Cross	8			2					1		2			0						3		8	9	
10	(England) (15) Jeremy Doncaster	8				3			0			1						2	2				8	10	
11	(England) (13) Chris Morton	7				2	2							2		0					1		7	11	
12	(Denmark) (8) Peter Ravn	5		X						2			2			1			0				5	12	3
13	(England) (6) Neil Evitts	5		2				1			1							1			0		5	13	2
14	(Finland) (14) Kai Niemi	4				1		0					1		2							0	4	14	
15	(England) (16) Marvyn Cox	1				0				0	0						1			0			1	15	
16	(Australia) (9) Steve Regeling	0			0		0						X					-		-			0	16	
R1	(England) (R1) Kelvin Tatum	1																		1			1	R1	
R2	(Denmark) (R2) John Jørgensen	0																E					0	R2	
Placing	Rider	Total	1	2	3	4	5	6	7	8	9	10	11	12	13	14	15	16	17	18	19	20	Pts	Pos	21

m - exclusion for exceeding two minute time allowance • t - exclusion for touching the tapes • x - other exclusion • e - retired or mechanical failure • f - fell • ns - non-starter • nc - non-classify

gate A - inside	gate B	gate C	gate D - outside

== World Final ==
- Scores accumulated from 2 days

=== Day 1 ===
- 5 September 1987
- (Netherlands) Amsterdam, Olympic Stadium
- Referee: Roman Cheladze

Placing	Rider	Total	1	2	3	4	5	6	7	8	9	10	11	12	13	14	15	16	17	18	19	20	Pts	Pos	21
1	(United States) (6) Sam Ermolenko	13		3				1			3							3			3		13	1	
2	(Denmark) (13) Erik Gundersen	13				3	3							3		3					1		13	2	
3	(Denmark) (2) Hans Nielsen	12	1					3				3				2				3			12	3	
4	(England) (15) Jeremy Doncaster	12				2			3			2						2	3				12	4	
5	(Sweden) (12) Per Jonsson	11			3					2		1			3						2		11	5	
6	(Denmark) (10) Jan O. Pedersen	10			2			2						1			3		2				10	6	
7	(Sweden) (4) Jimmy Nilsen	9	3							3				2				0				1	9	7	
8	(New Zealand) (5) Mitch Shirra	7		2			0					0					2					3	7	8	
9	(United States) (11) John Cook	7			1				2		1					1						2	7	9	
10	(England) (1) Simon Cross	7	2				1				2				1				1				7	10	
11	(Czechoslovakia) (14) Antonín Kasper, Jr.	5				1		0					2		2							0	5	11	
12	(England) (9) Chris Morton	5			0		2						0					1		2			5	12	
13	(West Germany) (3) Gerd Riss	4	F						1				3				T				0		4	13	
14	(Czechoslovakia) (8) Roman Matoušek	3		1						1			1			0			0				3	14	
15	(Netherlands) (7) Henny Kroeze	1		F					0					0	0					1			1	15	
16	(Poland) (16) Roman Jankowski	0				0				0	0						0			0			0	16	
R1	(Denmark) (R1) Peter Ravn	1															1						1	R1	
Placing	Rider	Total	1	2	3	4	5	6	7	8	9	10	11	12	13	14	15	16	17	18	19	20	Pts	Pos	21

m - exclusion for exceeding two minute time allowance • t - exclusion for touching the tapes • x - other exclusion • e - retired or mechanical failure • f - fell • ns - non-starter • nc - non-classify

gate A - inside	gate B	gate C	gate D - outside

=== Day 2 ===
- 6 September 1987
- (Netherlands) Olympic Stadium, Amsterdam
- Referee: Roman Cheladze

Placing	Rider	Total	1	2	3	4	5	6	7	8	9	10	11	12	13	14	15	16	17	18	19	20	Pts	Pos	21
1	(Denmark) (10) Hans Nielsen	15			3			3						3			3		3				15	1	
2	(Sweden) (5) Jimmy Nilsen	13		3			3					2					2					3	13	2	
3	(Denmark) (12) Erik Gundersen	11			1					1		3			3						3		11	3	3
4	(United States) (2) Sam Ermolenko	11	3					2				1				3				2			11	4	2
5	(Sweden) (7) Per Jonsson	11		2					2					2	2					3			11	5	
6	(Denmark) (4) Jan O. Pedersen	9	1							3				1				2				2	9	6	
7	(United States) (16) John Cook	8				3				0	3						1			1			8	7	
8	(Poland) (6) Roman Jankowski	8		1				1			1							3			2		8	8	
9	(England) (8) Jeremy Doncaster	8		0						2			2			2			2				8	9	
10	(Germany) (1) Gerd Riss	8	2				2				2				1				1				8	10	
11	(New Zealand) (15) Mitch Shirra	5				2			3			0						0	0				5	11	
12	(Czechoslovakia) (9) Antonín Kasper, Jr.	4			0		0						3					1		0			4	12	
13	(England) (13) Chris Morton	4				1	1							0		1					1		4	13	
14	(England) (11) Simon Cross	3			2				0		0					0						1	3	14	
15	(Czechoslovakia) (3) Roman Matoušek	2	0						1				1				0				0		2	15	
16	(Netherlands) (14) Henny Kroeze	0				0		E					0		E							0	0	16	
R1	(Denmark) (R1) Peter Ravn	0																					0	R1	
Placing	Rider	Total	1	2	3	4	5	6	7	8	9	10	11	12	13	14	15	16	17	18	19	20	Pts	Pos	21

m - exclusion for exceeding two minute time allowance • t - exclusion for touching the tapes • x - other exclusion • e - retired or mechanical failure • f - fell • ns - non-starter • nc - non-classify

gate A - inside	gate B	gate C	gate D - outside

=== Final standings ===
Pos.	Rider	Scores	Total
1	(Denmark) Hans Nielsen	12+15	27
2	(Denmark) Erik Gundersen	13+11	24+3
3	(United States) Sam Ermolenko	13+11	24+2
4	(Sweden) Jimmy Nilsen	9+13	22
5	(Sweden) Per Jonsson	11+11	22
6	(England) Jeremy Doncaster	12+8	20
7	(Denmark) Jan O. Pedersen	10+9	19
8	(United States) John Cook	7+8	15
9	(New Zealand) Mitch Shirra	7+5	12
10	(Germany) Gerd Riss	4+8	12
11	(England) Simon Cross	7+3	10
12	(Czech Republic) Antonín Kasper, Jr.	5+4	9
13	(England) Chris Morton	5+4	9
14	(Poland) Roman Jankowski	0+8	8
15	(Czech Republic) Roman Matoušek	3+2	5
16	(Netherlands) Henny Kroeze	1+0	1
R1	(Denmark) Peter Ravn	1	1
R2	(Soviet Union) Vladimir Trofimov	did not ride	-
