= 1993 Danish speedway season =

Season of speedway in Denmark

The 1993 Danish speedway season was the 1993 season of motorcycle speedway in Denmark.

== Individual ==
=== Individual Championship ===
The 1993 Danish Individual Speedway Championship was the 1993 edition of the Danish Individual Speedway Championship. The final was held over two rounds at Randers on 29 May and at Fjelsted on 31 May. The title was won by Hans Nielsen for the fifth time. He defeated rival Tommy Knudsen by overtaking his aggregate score in their final heat against each other. Knudsen had led by a single point going into the second round and by a single point going into the final race.

Five riders from the Danish final would progress to the Nordic Final as part of the 1993 Individual Speedway World Championship.

Final

Pos.	Rider	Scores	Total	Race off
1	Hans Nielsen	13,15	28	
2	Tommy Knudsen	14,13	27	
3	Brian Karger	10,11	21	3
4	John Jørgensen	9,12	21	2
5	Jan Stæchmann	9,12	21	1
6	Hans Clausen	7,10	17	
7	Jacob Olsen	9,6	15	
8	Kenneth Arnfred	7,7	14	
9	Peter Ravn	7,6	13	
10	Tom P. Knudsen	8,5	13	
11	Ole Hansen		11	
12	Ronni Pedersen		10	
13	Morten Andersen	5,5	10	
14	Kurt Hansen		8	
15	Brian Andersen (res)		5	
16	Allan Johansen	1,3	4	
17	Lars Henrik Jorgensen		2	

Key - Each heat has four riders, 3 points for a heat win, 2 for 2nd, 1 for third and 0 for last

=== Junior Championship ===
Carsten Hansen won the Junior Championship.

== Team ==
=== Danish Superliga ===
The 1993 season was won by Fredericia for the 6th time.

League table

Pos	Team	P	Pts
1	Fredericia	14	38
2	Fjelsted	14	29
3	Slangerup	14	28
4	Holsted	14	27
5	Holstebro	14	20
6	Brovst	14	10
7	Randers	14	9
8	Outrup	14	7

Play off

A play off round took place over two legs at Fjelsted on 25 September and at Fredericia on 26 September.

Pos	Team	P	Pts	Total
1	Fredericia	2	51, 38	89
2	Holsted	2	25, 40	65
3	Fjelsted	2	25, 19	44
4	Slangerup	2	19, 23	42
