= 1975 Danish speedway season =

Season of speedway in Denmark

The 1975 Danish speedway season was the 1975 season of motorcycle speedway in Denmark.

== Individual ==
=== Individual Championship ===
The 1975 Danish Individual Speedway Championship was the 1975 edition of the Danish Individual Speedway Championship. The final was held at Selskov Speedway in Hillerød on 28 September. The title was won by Ole Olsen for the 8th time.

Final

Pos.	Rider	Club	Total
1	Ole Olsen	Haderslev	15
2	Mike Lohmann	Hillerød	13
3	Kristian Præstbro	Esjberg	12
4	Finn Thomsen	Arhus	11
5	Kurt Bøgh	Holsted	11
6	Erling Rasmussen	Fredericia	10
7	Tage B. Nielsen	Esbjerg	9
8	Arne Andreasen	Fredericia	7
9	Gunnar Svendsen	Holsted	6
10	Jens Erik Krause Kjaer	Arhus	5
11	Godtfred Andreasen	Fredericia	4
12	Jorgen Walther Johansen	Hillerød	3
13	Erik Thillgard	Haderslev	2
14	Preben Rosenkilde	Arhus	2
15	Ernst Bøgh	Holsted	0
16	Otto Larsen	Fredericia	0

Key - Each heat has four riders, 3 points for a heat win, 2 for 2nd, 1 for third and 0 for last

=== Junior Championship ===
Finn Jensen won the Junior Championship.

== Team ==
=== Danish Tournament ===
The 1975 Danish Tournament was won by Faestningsdrengene Fredericia, who became Danish champions for the third time.

Division 1 league table

Pos	Team	P	Pts
1	Faestningsdrengene Fredericia	8	22
2	Vikingerne Esbjerg	8	21
3	Piraterne Århus	8	9
4	Klitrengene Esbjerg	8	6
5	Skansedrengene Fredericia	8	4

Division 2 Group 1

Pos	Team	P	Pts
1	Kulsvierne Hillerød	8	22
2	Hvepsene Haderslev	8	18
3	Esserne Esbjerg	8	10
4	Volddrengene Fredericia	8	7
5	Girafdrengene Odense	8	3

Division 2 Group 2

Pos	Team	P	Pts
1	Ulvene Midtsjaellands	8	20
2	Jokerne Esbjerg	8	15
3	Cimbrerne Aalborg	8	13
4	Ørnene Silkeborg	8	12
5	Brodrenene Fredericia	8	0

Division 2 Group 3

Pos	Team	P	Pts
1	Falkene Silkeborg	8	20
2	Fynborne Odin Odense	8	13
3	Drabanterne Hillerød	8	12
4	Hanerne Hanherred	8	9
5	Pythonerne Århus	8	6

Division 2 Group 4

Pos	Team	P	Pts
1	Holsted Tigers	8	24
2	Løverne Haderslev	8	13
3	Uldjyderne Herning	8	13
4	Laksene Randers	8	10
5	Rodspaetterne Frederikshavn	8	0

Division 2 Play off Group

Pos	Team	Pts
1	Holsted Tigers	37
2	Ulvene Midtsjaellands	27
3	Kulsvierne Hillerød	23
4	Falkene Silkeborg	20
