= 2005 Danish speedway season =

Season of speedway in Denmark

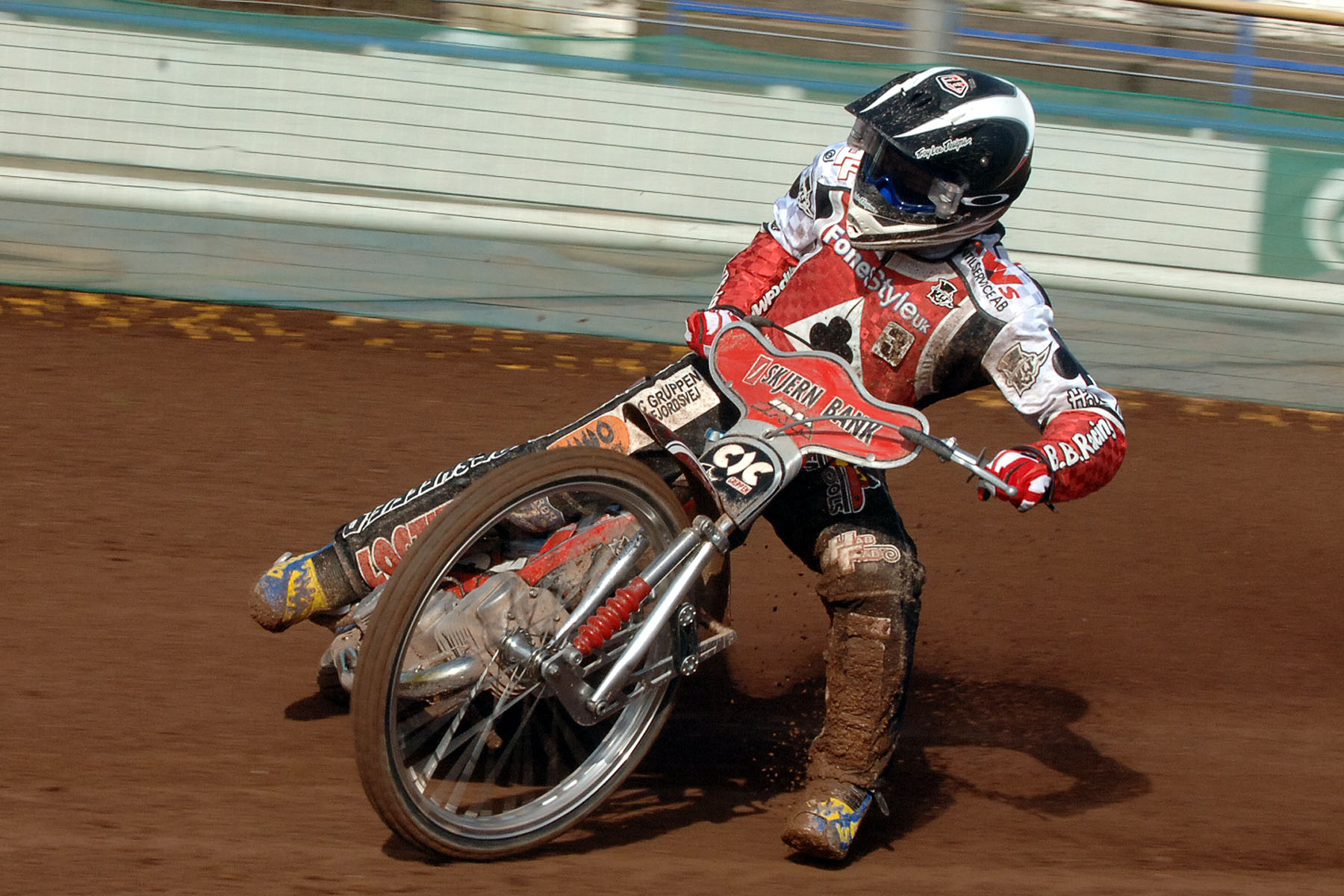
- Kenneth Bjerre was the U21 champion for the third consecutive year.

The 2005 Danish speedway season was the 2005 season of motorcycle speedway in Denmark.

== Individual ==
=== Individual Championship ===
The 2005 Danish Individual Speedway Championship was the 2005 edition of the Danish Individual Speedway Championship. The final was held at Fjelsted on 19 August. The title was won by Nicki Pedersen for the third time.

Final

Pos.	Rider	Team	Points	Total	Race off
1	Nicki Pedersen	Holsted	(3,3,3,3,3)	15	3
2	Niels Kristian Iversen	Holsted	(2,3,3,3,2)	13	2
3	Hans Andersen	Fredericia	(3,1,3,3,2)	12	1
4	Charlie Gjedde	Fredericia	(3,2,2,2,2)	11	0
5	Kenneth Bjerre	Slangerup	(0,1,2,3,3)	9	3
6	Morten Risager	Fredericia	(3,3,1,1,0)	8	2
7	Henrik Møller	Holsted	(1,2,3,1,3)	10	1
8	Bjarne Pedersen	Holsted	(2,3,2,2,1)	10	0
9	Henning Bager	Outrup	(1,2,0,2,1)	6	3
10	Jesper Kristiansen	Grindsted	(1,0,1,1,2)	5	2
11	Patrick Hougaard	Fredericia	(0,1,1,2,1)	5	1
12	Jesper B. Jensen	Slangerup	(2,0,2,1,3)	8	0
13	Anders Nielsen	Slangerup	(0,2,1,0,0)	3	
14	Claus Vissing	Holsted	(2,0,0,0,1)	3	
15	Nicolai Klindt	Fredericia	(1,1,0,0,0)	2	
16	Klaus Jakobsen	Slangerup	(0,0,0,0,0)	0	

Key Each heat has four riders, 3 points for a heat win, 2 for 2nd, 1 for third and 0 for last

=== U21 Championship ===
Kenneth Bjerre won the U21 Championship for the third successive year. The final was held at Holsted on 14 August.

Pos.	Rider	Team	Points
1	Kenneth Bjerre	Slangerup	15
2	Morten Risager	Fredericia	12
3	Patrick Hougaard	Fredericia	11
4	Henrik Møller	Holsted	11
5	Jan Graversen	Slangerup	10
6	Lars Hansen	Grinsted	8
7	Kenneth Kruse Hansen	Slangerup	8
8	Claus Vissing	Holsted	8
9	Steven Andersen	Outrup	7
10	Klaus Jakobsen	Slangerup	5
11	Jesper Kristiansen	Grinsted	5
12	Patrick Norgaard	Vojens	5
13	Claes Nedermark	Brovst	4
14	Nicolai Klindt	Fredericia	4
15	Jonas Raun	Holsted	3
16	Casper Wortmann	Holsted	3
17	Dannie Soderholm	Holsted	1

== Team ==
=== Danish Speedway League ===
The 2005 season was won by Fredericia for the 7th time. Only five teams lined up during the season which resulted in a play off round to determine the champion team.

Pos	Team	P	W	D	L	Pts	BP	Total
1	Holsted	8	6	0	2	20	4	24
2	Fredericia	8	6	0	2	20	3	23
3	Slangerup	8	3	0	5	14	2	16
4	Brovst	8	3	0	5	14	1	15
5	Outrup	8	2	0	6	12	0	12

Final round

- Match 1, held at Fjelsted on 31 August

Team	Score
Fredericia	40
Slangerup	28
Brovst	21
Holsted	19

- Match 2, held at Holsted on 24 September

Team	Score
Fredericia	42
Holsted	37
Slangerup	29
Brovst	8

=== Teams ===
Brovst

- Karol Ząbik
- Mariusz Puszakowski
- Robert Kosciecha
- Jacek Rempała
- Joonas Kylmakorpi
- Steen Jensen
- Pawel Hlib
- Robert Sawina
- Anders Andersen
- Nicolai Klindt
- Mads Georgsen
- Claes Nedermark

Fredericia

- Hans Andersen
- Sebastian Ulamek
- Wiesław Jaguś
- Henrik Gustafsson
- Morten Risager
- Ulrich Østergaard
- Patrick Hougaard
- Roman Chromik
- Christian Hefenbrock
- Charlie Gjedde

Holsted

- Nicki Pedersen
- Niels Kristian Iversen
- Bjarne Pedersen
- Henrik Møller
- Claus Vissing
- Jonas Raun
- Casper Wortmann
- Dannie Soderholm
- Niklas Klingberg
- Flemming Jakobsen

Outrup

- Henning Bager
- Steve R Andersen
- Piotr Paluch
- Anders Andersen
- Rune Sola
- Morten Gorm
- Kim Pedersen
- Kaj Laukkanen
- Andreas Messing
- Robert Flis
- Jarosław Łukaszewski

Slangerup

- Jesper B. Jensen
- Kenneth Bjerre
- Anders Nielsen
- Klaus Jakobsen
- Kenneth Kruse Hansen
- Jan Graversen
- Grzegorz Walasek
- Adrian Miedzinski
- Leon Madsen
- Ronni Pedersen
- Mattias Nilsson
- Mads Korneliussen
- Niels Nielsen
