= Danish handball league system =

Handball league pyramid,

The Danish handball league system, also known as the handball league pyramid, refers to the hierarchically interconnected league structure for handball in Denmark, in which all divisions are bound together by the principle of promotion and relegation. Within men's handball, the top two professional levels contain one division each. Below this, the semi-professional and amateur levels have progressively more parallel divisions, which each cover progressively smaller geographic areas. The top four tiers are classed as nationwide, while the fifth tier and below are classed provincial leagues. Teams that finish at the top of their division at the end of each season can rise higher in the pyramid, while those that finish at the bottom find themselves sinking further down. In theory it is possible for even the lowest local amateur club to rise to the top of the system and become Danish handball champions one day. The number of teams promoted and relegated between the divisions varies, and promotion to the upper levels of the pyramid is usually contingent on meeting additional criteria, especially concerning appropriate facilities and finances.

The league system is held under the jurisdiction of the Danish HA (DHF) and its four regional associations. Dansk Arbejder Idrætsforbund (DAI) run a separate league system for their members. The pyramid for women's football in Denmark runs separately with fewer divisions and levels. The women's top-flight league is semi-professional and additional criteria apply, the higher the team is placed in the league system.

== Current structure ==
=== Men's league system ===
Level	League(s) / Division(s)^{1}
	Professional Leagues
1	Herreligaen; 15 clubs ↓ 2.5 relegation spots
2	1. division 14 clubs; ↑ 1.5 promotion spots, ↓ 3-5 relegation spots
3	2. division 3 divisions of 12 clubs; ↑ 3-5 promotion spots, ↓ 5 relegation spots
4	3. division 6 divisions of 12 clubs; ↑ 3 promotion spots, ↓ 8 relegation spots
