= Steen Mastrup =

Danish speedway rider

- Born: 2 June 1958 (age 68); Naestved, Denmark
- Nationality: Danish

Career history
- 1978-1983: Swindon Robins
- 1983: Leicester Lions

Steen Erik Mastrup (born 2 June 1958) is a Danish former motorcycle speedway rider.

== Career ==
Born in Naestved, Mastrup established himself in Danish speedway and represented Denmark at under-21 level in 1977. He made his British League debut in 1978 with Swindon Robins. At the time, his girlfriend was his mechanic. By 1981, his average had risen to above six points per match. He was capped several times in the full Denmark team.

After an injury in 1982, Mastrup signed again for Swindon but suffered a drop in form in 1983 and transferred to Leicester Lions. This was his final season in British speedway. (His form improved at Leicester later that year and he positively announced at the end of year meeting he would be back next season but the sudden closure of the Leicester track that winter probably resulted in his non-return to British speedway.
