= Gert Handberg =

Danish speedway rider

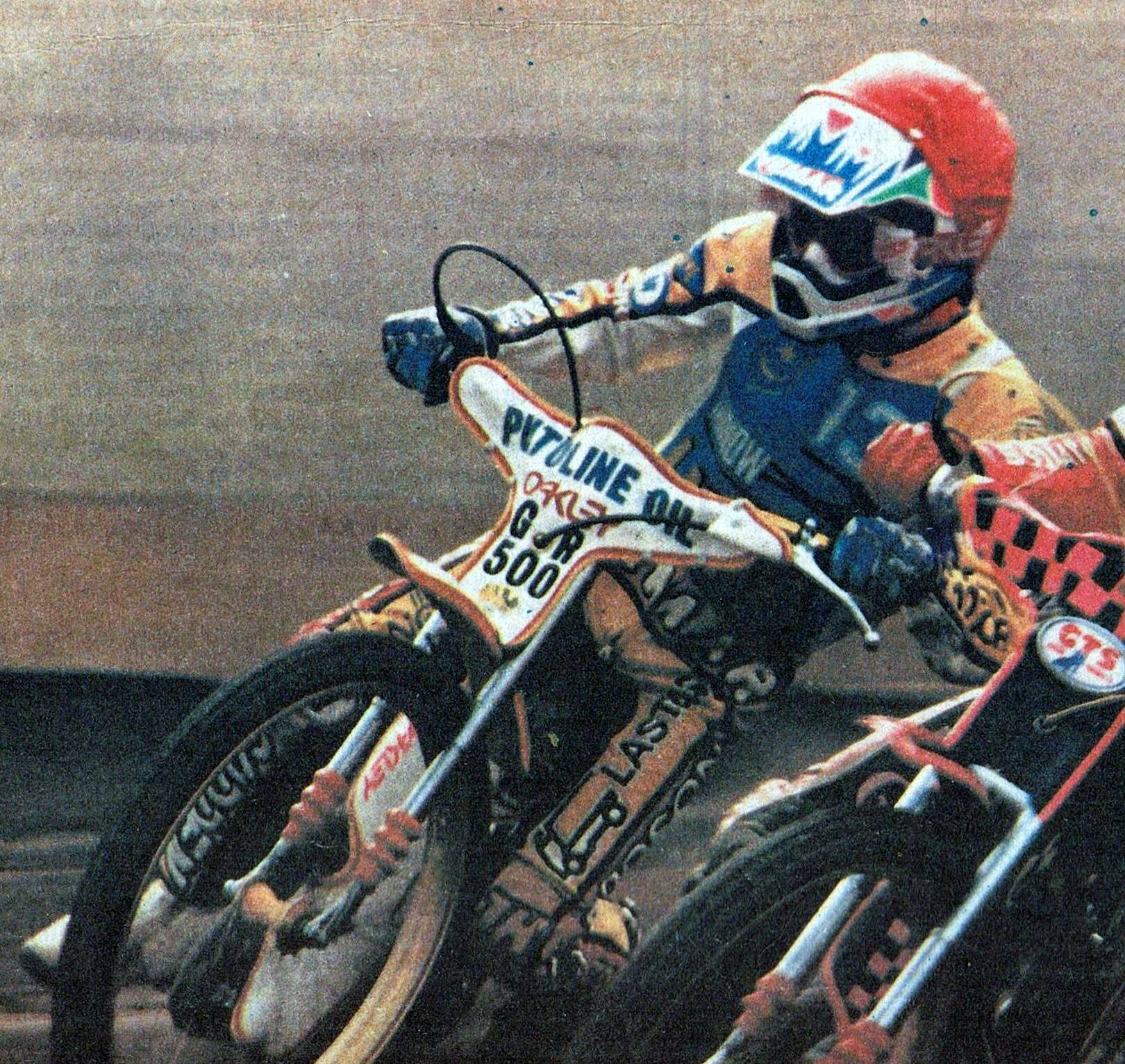
- Handberg in 1993
- Born: 30 May 1969 (age 57); Brædstrup, Denmark
- Nationality: Danish

Career history

Denmark
- 1987–1989, 1996: Fredericia
- 1990–1992: Holsted
- 1994–1995: Slangerup
- 2000–2002: Brovst

Great Britain
- 1988–1993: Cradley Heath

Poland
- 1992–1994: Tarnów
- 1999–2000: Toruń
- 2001–2002: Gniezno

Sweden
- 1992: Dackarna

Individual honours
- 1992: Speedway World Championship bronze
- 1992: Danish Champion
- 1988: Danish Junior Champion

Gert Handberg (born 30 May 1969 in Brædstrup) is a Danish former international motorcycle speedway rider. He earned 20 caps for the Denmark national speedway team.

== Career ==
Handberg joined Cradley Heathens in 1988 on a recommendation, after winning the Danish Junior Championship during the 1986 Danish speedway season. He rode for the club for six consecutive seasons.

In 1992, Handberg became the champion of Denmark and won the bronze medal in the 1992 Individual Speedway World Championship, this was despite suffering broken jaw and leg injuries in a British league match during the same season.

Handberg was a member of the Denmark speedway team when they won the 1991 World Team Cup. He also won the World Under-21 Championship in 1989 and finished third in the 1992 senior world final.

== World Final Appearances ==
=== Individual World Championship ===
- 1991 - (Sweden) Gothenburg, Ullevi - Reserve - did not ride
- 1992 - (Poland) Wrocław, Olympic Stadium - 3rd - 10pts

=== World Team Cup ===
- 1989 - (England) Bradford, Odsal Stadium - (with Hans Nielsen / Erik Gundersen / John Jørgensen / Brian Karger) - 2nd - 34pts (9)
