= Jan Pedersen (speedway rider) =

Danish speedway rider

- Born: 27 July 1967 (age 59); Brændekilde, Denmark
- Nationality: Danish

Career history

Denmark
- 1992: Vissenbjerg

Great Britain
- 1991, 1993-1995, 1997, 1998, 2000: Arena Essex Hammers
- 1991: Milton Keynes Knights
- 1992, 1993: Rye House Rockets
- 1994, 1996: Reading Racers
- 1996: London Lions
- 1998, 2000: Ipswich Witches
- 1998: Swindon Robins
- 1999: Berwick Bandits
- 2000: Poole Pirates

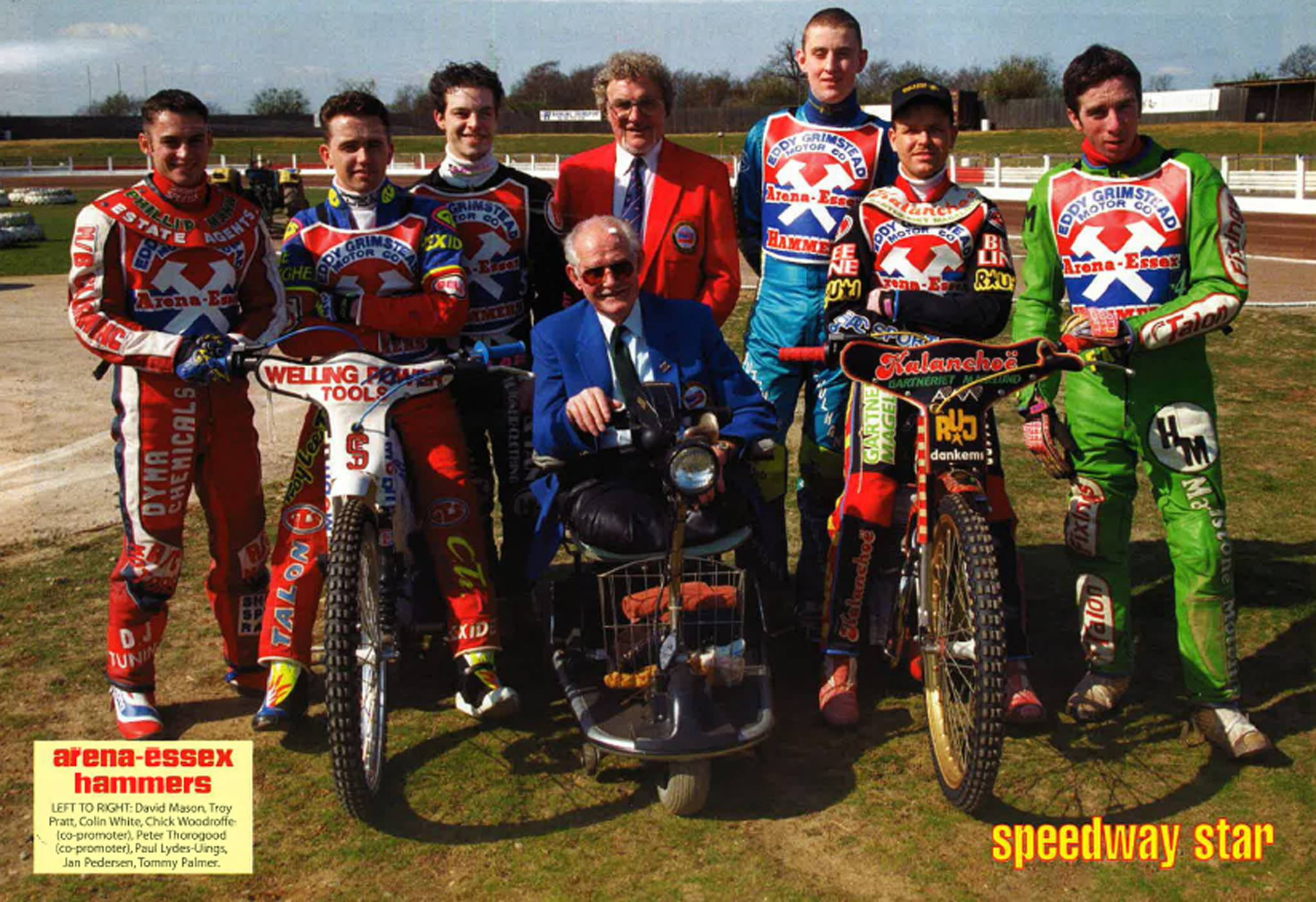
Arena Essex Speedway Team 1997 - David Mason, Troy Pratt, Colin White, Chick Woodroffe, Peter Thorogood, Paul Lydes-Uings, Jan Pedersen, Tommy Palmer

Jan Henrik Pedersen (born 27 July 1967) is a former motorcycle speedway rider from Denmark. He earned three caps for the Denmark national speedway team.

He is not to be confused with Jan O. Pedersen.

== Career ==
Pedersen rode in the top tier of British Speedway, riding for various clubs from 1991 until 2000. He first rode for the Arena Essex Hammers in 1991.

Pedersen reached the 1990 Nordic final during the 1990 Individual Speedway World Championship, which was coincidentally won by his namesake Jan O. Pedersen. He was an integral part of the Arena Essex team, for the league winning campaign during the 1991 British League Division Two season.

In 1996, Pedersen rode for Reading Racers again. He performed regularly as a heat leader and was a popular Arena Essex stalwart, winning the Essex Championship in 1997. He then finished second in 1998 in the very same tournament, only losing out in a late evening run-off against a top-form Carl Stonehewer. Pedersen signed for Berwick Bandits in 1999 before finishing his British leagues career after the 2000 season.
