= Peter Glanz (motorcyclist) =

Danish speedway rider

- Born: 3 May 1962 (age 64); Fredericia, Denmark
- Nationality: Danish

Career history

Denmark
- 1987–1992: Frederica

Great Britain
- 1983–1987, 1993: Reading Racers
- 1988: Wolverhampton Wolves
- 1989: Mildenhall Fen Tigers
- 1990–1992: Milton Keynes Knights
- 1993: Oxford Cheetahs

Individual honours
- 1989: league pairs silver

Peter Lybaek Glanz (born 3 May 1962) is a former motorcycle speedway rider from Denmark.

== Career ==
Glanz started his British leagues career during the 1983 British League season, where he rode for Reading Racers. He continued to ride for Reading for five years and became an integral part of their team during that period. He went on to earn three caps for the Denmark national speedway team.

In 1988, Glanz joined four other fellow Danes at Wolverhampton Wolves for the 1988 British League season following problems with a deal with the King's Lynn Stars. In 1989, he moved down a division to join Mildenhall Fen Tigers in 1989. He finished runner up in the British League Division Two Pairs Championship, with Preben Eriksen (who had also joined Mildenhall from Wolves) for the 1989 National League season.

Glanz switched to Milton Keynes Knights in 1990 and despite being the teams's top scorer the Knights finished last. He was part of the Milton Keynes team for the following two seasons but the team withdrew during the 1992 British League Division Two season. For his final season in Britain, he returned to Reading in one of the reserve berths.

== Family ==
His son Nicki Jens Glanz was also a speedway rider.
