= Fredericia Speedway =

Speedway club in Fredericia, Denmark

Club information
- Track address: Various
- Country: Denmark
- Founded: 1945
- Closed: 2005
- League: Danish Super League

Major team honours
Team champions	1968, 1974, 1975, 1987, 1989, 1993, 2005

Fredericia Speedway was a motorcycle speedway club from Fredericia in Denmark, which competed in the Danish Speedway League until the end of their league winning 2005 season. They are seven times champions of Denmark, having won the title in 1968, 1974, 1975, 1987, 1989, 1993 and 2005.

== History ==
=== 1945 to 1971 ===
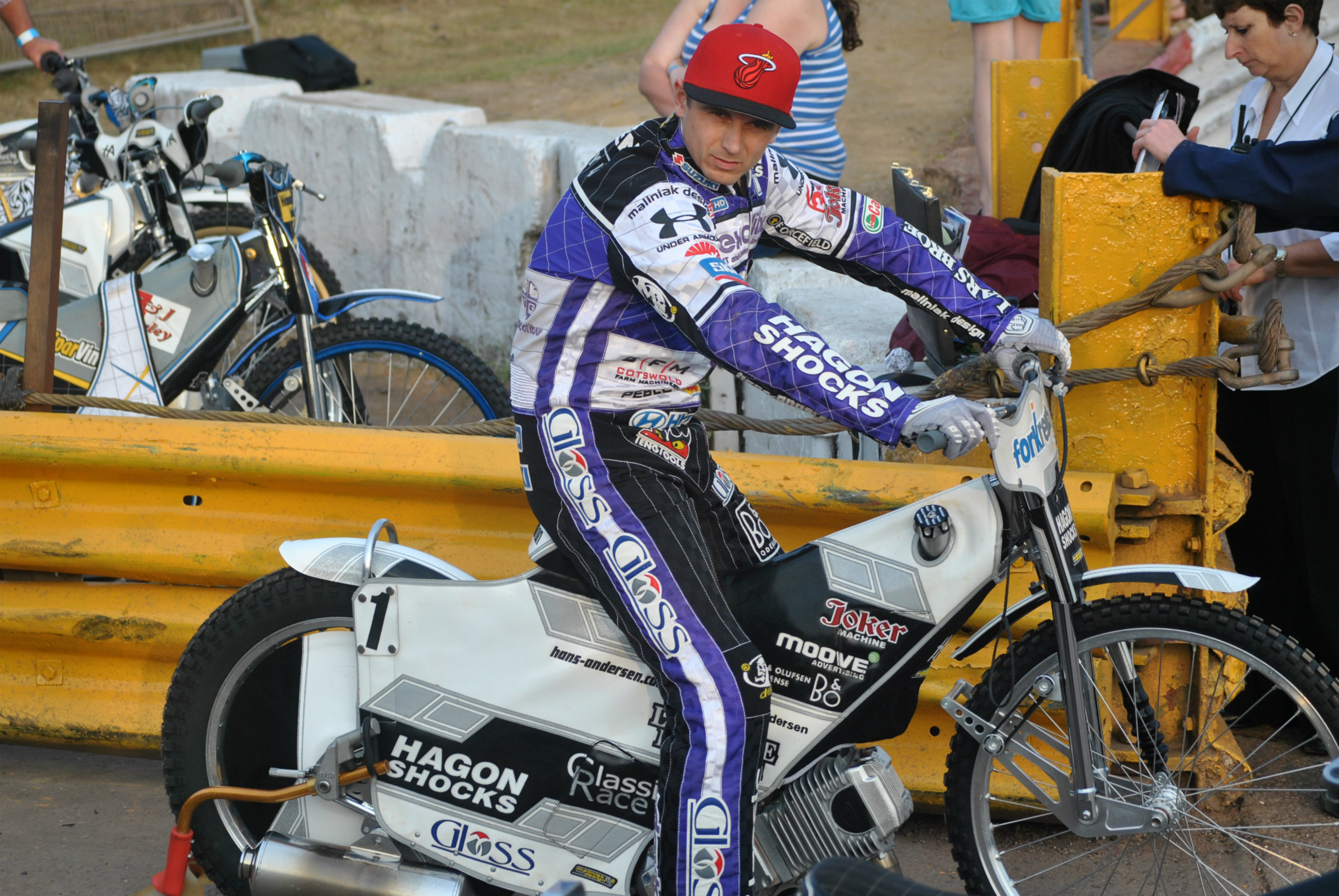
Hans Andersen helped the club win their last title in 2005

Fredericia Speedway's origins started with the founding of the Fredericia Motor Klubb in 1945 and with a speedway track being built in 1958. The home venue of the club was the Vejlby Speedway Center, which is still located on the northern outskirts of Fredericia. In 1967, a new organised tournament was formed with seven teams being registered, one of which was the team called Faestningsdrengene (the Fortress Boys) and they won the league in 1968. The track at Vejlby was used until 1971 and three years later (1974) it was rebuilt exclusively as a smaller track for machines of the 50cc and 80cc.

=== 1972 to 1985 ===
The need for a larger track resulted in the speedway team using the 370 metre Fredericia Speedway Stadium (the old Fredericia Stadion), owned by the Fredericia Municipality but events being organised by the Fredericia Motor Klub. After five second places in the Danish Speedway League they finally won division 1 again in 1974, to become the Danish champions for the second time. The club ran other teams in the lower divisions called Skansedrengene, Volddrengene and Brodrenene.

Further success was experienced in 1975, before the introduction of the professional Danish Speedway League (which was established in 1986).

=== 1986 to 1996 ===
The team had issues with the Municipality over the limited access to the stadium. It could not be used more than once a week due to it being in a residential area. Therefeore the decision was made to lease the Frederikslyst Motorbane for the new professional league. The team finished 2nd in the inaugural Super League in 1986. They then won their fourth title in 1987.

The team continued their success by winning the 1989 Superliga. The team included riders such as Jan O. Pedersen, Gert Handberg, Brian Karger and Frede Schött. Continuing to challenge at the highest level they signed riders like Tommy Knudsen and Brian Andersen and won another league title in 1993. Unfortunately, after the 1995 season the club ran into financial difficulties and were unable to field a team during 1997.

=== 2004 to 2005 ===
After seven years dormant, the team returned for the 2004 Danish speedway season and won their seventh Championship during the 2005 Danish speedway season. However, 2005 turned out to be the last season for the team as they once again folded and remain closed today. The reason for closing were quoted as a result of not having their own track and the financial issues caused by renting the Fjelsted Speedway Stadium.

== Notable riders ==
- (Denmark) Brian Andersen
- (Denmark) Hans Andersen
- (Denmark) Godtfred Andreasen
- (Denmark) Hans Peter Boisen
- (Denmark) Gert Handberg
- (Denmark) Brian Karger
- (Denmark) Tommy Knudsen
- (Denmark) Jan O. Pedersen
