= Frederikshavn Speedway =

Speedway club near Frederikshavn, Denmark

Club information
- Track address: Ørnedalen, Vandløsvej 29, 9300 Sæby, Frederikshavn Municipality
- Country: Denmark
- Founded: 1937

Major team honours
Danish Speedway League silver medal	1988
Danish Speedway League bronze medal	1981, 1990

Frederikshavn Speedway or Sæby Speedway Klub is a motorcycle speedway club from Denmark, who competed in the Danish Speedway League from 1974 to until 1994.

== Track ==
The home venue of the club was the Ørnedalen track (390 metres in circumference), which was located approximately 15 kilometres south of Frederikshavn and 3 kilometres west of Sæby on the Vandløsvej 29 (57°19′44″N 10°28′15″E).

== History ==
The Frederikshavn Motor Sports club (FrMS) was founded in 1937 and in 1950 they opened a speedway track at the Frederikshavn Stadium. However, in 1956, the club relocated to a purpose-built facility built near Sæby and the motor sports center grew in size over the following decades. The speedway track was known as Ørnedalen opened on 10 June 1956 and later in 1979, a moto cross circuit was opened.

The speedway team began participation in the Danish tournament (league) during the 1974 Danish speedway season, racing as Rødspætterne (the Plaice) because of the industry connected to the town. Rødspætterne won the second division in 1979 and gained promotion, which led to the creation of a second team Hajerne (the Sharks) in 1980.

Rødspætterne won the bronze medal during the 1981 Danish speedway season and the two teams continued to compete until 1986. The new professional league was introduced in 1986 and was called the Danish Superliga. The Frederikshavn speedway team, as they were now known, were not selected as founder members of the top division in 1986 but did race in the 1987 Superliga and won the silver medal in 1988.

In 1990, the speedway section split from the Frederikshavn Motor Sports club and became the Sæby Speedway Klub. The same season the team won the bronze medal but then struggled financially to compete in the Superliga and withdrew from the Danish league system at the end of 1994.

In 2022, the Sæby Speedway Klub returned to Frederikshavn for the first time in nearly 40 years, when they held an ice speedway meeting in the Iscenter Nord.
