= Jens Rasmussen (speedway rider) =

Danish speedway rider (born 1959)

- Born: 26 May 1959 (age 67); Odense, Denmark
- Nationality: Danish

Career history

Denmark
- 1987: Fjelsted

Great Britain
- 1981-1983: Hackney Hawks
- 1984-1985, 1987: Oxford Cheetahs
- 1986-1987: Ipswich Witches
- 1988-1993: Rye House Rockets
- 1994: Middlesbrough Bears
- 1995: King's Lynn Stars
- 1995: Peterborough Panthers

Team honours
- 1985: British League Champion
- 1985: British League KO Cup winner
- 1985: Midland Cup

Jens Rasmussen (born 26 May 1959 in Odense, Denmark) is a former speedway rider from Denmark. He earned 17 caps for the Denmark national speedway team.

== Career summary ==
Rasmussen started his United Kingdom career in the British League with the Hackney Hawks in 1981 and rode with them until the end of the 1983 season when the Hawks closed. He started practice runs around Oxford Stadium before he was officially signed by the Oxford Cheetahs for the 1984 British League season. The Oxford team had returned to the British League and the other signings to start as the top-five riders for the season were Hans Nielsen for a record £30,000, Simon Wigg for £25,000, Marvyn Cox for £15,000 and Melvyn Taylor for £12,000, with Ian Clark and Nigel Sparshott at 6 & 7. After a mid table finish in 1984 he was part of the Oxford team that won the league and cup double during a 1985 British League season.

Rasmussen moved to and rode for Ipswich Witches in 1986, breakng his collarbone early in the season. He continued to ride for Ipswich in 1987. Then in 1988 the Rye House Rockets announced they wished to use him in the National League. After much debate, he was allowed to race due to the fact he had already been living in the United Kingdom for the previous five years and that he had an English wife and child. The move made history when he signed for the Rye House Rockets in the National League because he was the first non-Commonwealth rider to be allowed to ride at that level.

After Rye House, Rasmussen rode for Middlesbrough Bears, King's Lynn Stars and Peterborough Panthers.
