= Allan Johansen (speedway rider) =

Danish speedway rider (born 1966)

- Born: 2 December 1966 (age 59); Odense, Denmark
- Nationality: Danish

Career history

Denmark
- 1986–1989: Fjelsted
- 1991–1992: Holsted

Great Britain
- 1987: Hackney Kestrels
- 1988–1989: King's Lynn Stars
- 1992: Arena Essex Hammers

Individual honours
- 1984: Danish U21 silver

Team honours
- 1986: Danish Speedway League

Allan Johansen (born 2 December 1966) is a former motorcycle speedway rider from Denmark. He earned five caps for the Denmark national speedway team.

== Career ==
Johansen came to prominence after winning the silver medal at the Danish Under 21 Individual Speedway Championship in 1984. He reached the final of the Under-21 World Championship on two occasions in 1986 and 1987.

Johansen started racing in the British leagues during the 1987 British League season, when riding for the Hackney Kestrels. He broke his leg riding in 1990 and missed two British league seasons before returning for Arena Essex Hammers in 1992.
