= Sam Nikolajsen =

Danish speedway rider

- Born: 28 February 1961 (age 65); Løkken, Denmark
- Nationality: Danish

Career history

Denmark
- 1987: Frederikshavn

Great Britain
- 1982–1984: Coventry Bees
- 1985: Sheffield Tigers
- 1986: Wolverhampton Wolves

Sweden
- 1985: Dackarna
- 1987–1988: Skepparna

Individual honours
- 1981: Danish U21 champion

Sam Nygaard Nikolajsen (born 28 February 1961) is a former motorcycle speedway rider from Denmark. He earned x caps for the Denmark national speedway team.

== Career ==
Nikolajsen became the Danish Junior Champion in 1981 after winning the Danish Junior Championship.

Nikolajsen made his debut in the British leagues in 1982, when he joined the Coventry Bees for the 1982 British League season. He stayed at Coventry for three seasons and was then put on the transfer list, which then saw him join Sheffield Tigers in 1985. His final season in Britain was riding for the Wolverhampton Wolves in 1986.
