= John Eskildsen =

Danish speedway rider

- Born: 21 November 1960 (age 66); Jebjerg, Denmark
- Nationality: Danish

Career history

Denmark
- 1984: Herning
- 1987: Brovst
- 1989–1990: Frederikshavn/Saeby

Great Britain
- 1980–1981, 1982: Birmingham Brummies
- 1981: Hull Vikings
- 1983–1984: Eastbourne Eagles
- 1985–1987: Wolverhampton Wolves

Individual honours
- 1980: Danish U21 champion
- 1984: Danish Championship silver medal

John Eskildsen (born 21 November 1960) is a former motorcycle speedway rider from Denmark. He earned 11 caps for the Denmark national speedway team.

== Career ==
Eskildsen became the Danish Junior Champion in 1980, after winning the Danish Junior Championship.

Eskildsen made his debut in Britain in 1980, when he joined the Birmingham Brummies for the 1980 British League season. After a difficult start where he only rode in a handful of matches, he switched to the Hull Vikings and completed a full season, averaging 4.62.

In 1983, Eskildsen joined the Eastbourne Eagles and cemented his career as a heat leader as well as representing the Denmark national speedway team. By the end of 1984, he averaged 8.07 and had won the silver medal at the 1984 Danish Individual Speedway Championship. He then joined Wolverhampton Wolves, where he spent three more seasons from 1985 to 1987.
