= Peter Ravn (speedway rider) =

Danish speedway rider

- Born: 16 March 1962 (age 64); Bogense, Denmark
- Nationality: Danish

Career history

Denmark
- 1984–1993: Randers

Great Britain
- 1981-1983, 1987-1990: Belle Vue Aces
- 1983: Cradley Heath Heathens
- 1984-1986: Wolverhampton Wolves
- 1991: Coventry Bees
- 1992, 1993: Arena Essex Hammers

Individual honours
- 1982: European U-21 bronze

Team honours
- 1983: Speedway World Team Cup gold medal
- 1982, 1983: British League Champion
- 1983: British League KO Cup winner
- 1983: Midland Cup Winner

Peter Ravn (born 16 March 1962) is a former international motorcycle speedway rider from Denmark. He earned 42 caps for the Denmark national speedway team.

== Speedway career ==
Ravn rode in the top tier of British Speedway for Belle Vue Aces from 1981 to 1983. Ravn was also a World Under 21 finalist in 1981 and 1982 but came to prominence after winning the bronze medal at the 1982 Individual Speedway Junior European Championship, losing out on the silver medal after a run-off defeat to Mark Courtney.

Ravn won a gold medal as member of the Denmark speedway team at the Speedway World Team Cup in the 1983 Speedway World Team Cup and the year continued to provide success when Ravn after joining Cradley Heathens, helped the Midlands club seal the league and cup double during the 1983 British League season.

Ravn joined Wolverhampton Wolves in 1984, where he rode until the end of the 1986 season, returning to first club Belle Vue.

After a season with Coventry Bees in 1991, Ravn finished his career at Arena Essex Hammers from 1992 to 1993.

== World Final Appearances ==
=== Individual World Championship ===
- 1983 - (West Germany) Norden, Motodrom Halbemond - reserve - did not ride
- 1987 - (Netherlands) Amsterdam, Olympic Stadium - reserve - 1pt

=== World Team Cup ===
- 1983 - (Denmark) Vojens, Speedway Center (with Ole Olsen / Erik Gundersen / Finn Thomsen / Hans Nielsen) - Winner - 37pts (7)
