= Per Sørensen =

Danish speedway rider

Per Sorensen
- Born: 20 June 1962 (age 64); Sundbylille, Denmark
- Nationality: Danish

Career history

Denmark
- 1990: Slangerup

Great Britain
- 1983–1986: Swindon Robins
- 1986: Oxford Cheetahs

Sweden
- 1987, 1991: Dackarna
- 1990: Skepparna

Team honours
- 1986: British League Champion
- 1986 (shared): British League KO Cup Winner
- 1986 (shared): British League Cup
- 1986: Midland Cup Winner
- 1990: Allsvenskan Div 1 Champion

Per Sorensen (born 20 June 1962) is a former international speedway rider from Denmark. He earned three caps for the Denmark national speedway team.

== Speedway career ==
Sorensen signed for Swindon Robins in 1983 and rode in the top tier of British Speedway from 1983 to 1986.

When Finn Thomsen joined Swindon for the 1986 season, Sorensen was forced out of the team. Oxford Cheetahs signed him and partnered him with Hans Nielsen, a move that helped the Oxford team achieve the treble winning season of 1986.
