= Jan O. Pedersen =

Danish speedway rider

- Born: 9 November 1962 (age 64); Middelfart, Denmark
- Nationality: Danish

Career history

Great Britain
- 1983, 1985–1992: Cradley Heathens
- 1984: Sheffield Tigers

Denmark
- 1987–1988, 1990–1991: Fjelsted
- 1989: Fredericia

Sweden
- 1992: Dackarna

Individual honours
- 1991: World Individual Champion
- 1987: 16-Lapper

Team honours
- 1986, 1987, 1988, 1991: World Team Cup winner
- 1990, 1991: World Pairs Champion
- 1983: British League Champion
- 1983, 1986 (shared), 1987: British League KO Cup winner
- 1986 (shared): British League Cup
- 1983, 1987: Midland Cup Winner

Competition record

Representing Denmark

Speedway World Championship
Gold medal – first place	1991	
Silver medal – second place	1986	
Bronze medal – third place	1988	

Speedway World Team Cup
Gold medal – first place	1986	
Gold medal – first place	1987	
Gold medal – first place	1988	
Gold medal – first place	1991	

Speedway World Pairs Championship
Gold medal – first place	1990	
Gold medal – first place	1991	

Intercontinental Cup
Gold medal – first place	1988	

Speedway Champions Cup
Gold medal – first place	1989	

Long Track World Championship
Bronze medal – third place	1991	

Jan Osvald Pedersen (born 9 November 1962 in Middelfart, Denmark) is a former Speedway rider who became Speedway World Champion in 1991 after finishing runner-up in 1986 and in third place in 1988 behind fellow Danes Erik Gundersen and Hans Nielsen. He also won the Speedway World Pairs Championship in 1990 and 1991, both times partnered by Hans Nielsen. He earned 42 caps for the Denmark national speedway team.

== Career ==
In 1982, Pedersen signed for the Cradley Heathens but did not ride until the following season when his first British meeting heralded a five-point return in Birmingham's Second City individual Trophy on 18 March. His future had been plotted for Dudley Wood almost a year earlier when he was recommended to Heathens team manager Peter Adams by his countryman, Bent Rasmussen. The ensuing months brought three more clubs knocking on his door but in August, Pedersen publicly pledged his future to Cradley.

Pedersen finished his debut season with a 7.20 league average and Cradley's team total soared over 60-plus points as they won the British League and cup double again and the Midland Cup. The decision was then made by new manager Colin Pratt to loan the Dane out and he spent 1984 with Sheffield. Despite that season being marred by a broken arm, he did enough to convince Tigers' promoter Maurice Ducker that he was worth buying. However, Pratt refused to sell and Pedersen's return to Dudley Wood for 1985 saw the start of an uninterrupted 8-year stint with the club. Pedersen achieved success for club, country and individually.

In 1985, Pedersen was a heat leader for the Heathens and became part of the dominant Danish national team of the era. In the Cradley team he was second only to Erik Gundersen and won three consecutive Speedway World Team Cups in 1986, 1987 and 1988, riding alongside the Danish greats of Hans Nielsen, Gundersen and Tommy Knudsen. He won the British League Riders' Championship, held at Belle Vue Stadium on 9 October 1988.

Pedersen topped the Cradley team averages in 1989 and then led the team during the 1990 British League season, following Cradley's loss of Gundersen. That season he also won his first Speedway World Pairs Championship riding with Nielsen but it was the 1991 season that became the pinnacle of Pedersen's career. He won the ultimate prize of winning the Speedway World Championship in addition to the winning a second World pairs title with Nielsen and Knudsen and a fourth World Cup win.

Still aged only 29, Pedersen's speedway career was brought to a premature end in his testimonial year. Less than a fortnight after Pedersen's 10-year testimonial at Cradley, he crashed in Denmark and suffered a serious back injury and never raced competitively again. Since 1993 he has been doing some saloon car racing in Denmark and won a championship in his first season. He has also had one year spells as team manager with Oxford and promoter with Cradley when the Cradley team spent the 1996 season riding at Stoke.

In 1999, Pedersen raced in the 25th Anniversary meeting at Denmark's Vojens track. A series of competitive races were held involving old and current international stars, including Gary Havelock, Henrik Gustafsson and Jesper B. Monberg. Pedersen managed to win every one of his races in his first track return since his career-ending accident in 1992.

In 2012, Pedersen joined the Dudley Heathens Speedway team as their team coach. Dudley Heathens has roots with Cradley Heathens who currently ride at Perry Barr Stadium with the Birmingham Brummies.

== World Final Appearances ==
World Championship Final results timeline
Year	1983	1984	1985	1986	1987	1988	1989	1990	1991
Finishing position	-	-	9	2	7	3	-	-	1

=== Individual World Championship ===
- 1985 - (England) Bradford, Odsal Stadium - 9th - 7pts
- 1986 - (Poland) Chorzów, Silesian Stadium - 2nd - 13pts
- 1987 - (Netherlands) Amsterdam, Olympic Stadium - 7th - 19pts
- 1988 - (Denmark) Vojens, Speedway Center - 3rd - 13pts
- 1991 - (Sweden) Gothenburg, Ullevi - Winner - 15pts

* Pedersen qualified for the 1989 and 1990 World Final's but withdrew injured on both occasions.

=== World Pairs Championship ===
- 1990 - (West Germany) Landshut, Ellermühle Stadium (with Hans Nielsen) - Winner - 43pts (24)
- 1991 - (Poland) Poznań, Olimpia Poznań Stadium (with Hans Nielsen / Tommy Knudsen) - Winner - 28pts (14)

=== World Team Cup ===
- 1986 - (Sweden) Gothenburg, Ullevi, (Denmark) Vojens, Speedway Center and (England) Bradford, Odsal Stadium (with Hans Nielsen / Erik Gundersen / Tommy Knudsen / John Jørgensen) - Winner - 129pts (30)
- 1987 - (Denmark) Fredericia, Fredericia Speedway, (England) Coventry, Brandon Stadium and (Czech Republic) Prague, Marketa Stadium (with Hans Nielsen / Erik Gundersen / Tommy Knudsen) - Winner - 130pts (32)
- 1988 - (United States) Long Beach, Veterans Memorial Stadium (with Hans Nielsen / Erik Gundersen / Tommy Knudsen / John Jørgensen) - Winner - 44pts (12)
- 1991 - (Denmark) Vojens, Speedway Center (with Hans Nielsen / Tommy Knudsen / Gert Handberg / Brian Karger) - Winner - 51pts (15)

=== Individual Under-21 World Championship ===
- 1982 - (West Germany) Pocking, Rottalstadion - 5th - 10pts
- 1983 - (Italy) Lonigo, Santa Marina Stadium - 12th - 5pts
