= 2007 Danish speedway season =

Season of speedway in Denmark

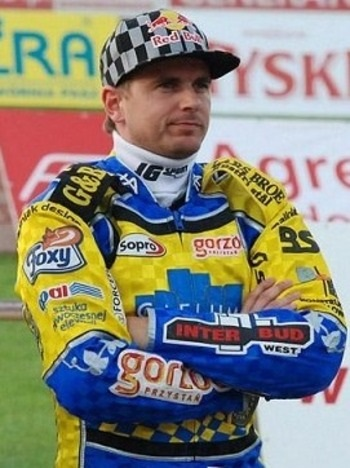
- Hans Andersen became the Danish champion

The 2007 Danish speedway season was the 2007 season of motorcycle speedway in Denmark.

== Individual ==
=== Individual Championship ===
The 2007 Danish Individual Speedway Championship was the 2007 edition of the Danish Individual Speedway Championship. The final was staged over two rounds, at Holsted on 1 June and at Fjelsted on 3 August. The title was won by Hans Andersen.

Final

Pos.	Rider	Team	R1 & R2	Total	Race off
1	Hans Andersen	Fjelsted	(14,12)	26	3
2	Bjarne Pedersen	Holstebro	(14,13)	27	2
3	Nicki Pedersen	Holsted	(11,14)	25	1
4	Niels Kristian Iversen	Holsted	(13,12)	25	0
5	Kenneth Bjerre	Slangerup	(11,12)	23	3
6	Jesper B Jensen	Esbjerg	(8,1)	18	2
7	Mads Korneliussen	Esbjerg	(4,8)	12	1
8	Charlie Gjedde	Outrup	(8,9)	17	0
9	Patrick Hougaard	Holsted	(6,6)	12	3
10	Nicolai Klindt	Outrup	(6,8)	14	2
11	Kenneth Kruse Hansen	Slangerup	(4,5)	9	1
12	Henning Bager	Outrup	(4,4)	8	0
13	Leon Madsen	Slangerup	(7,1)	8	
14	Henrik Møller	Holsted	(7,1)	8	
15	Ulrich Østergaard	Holsted	(3,2)	5	
16	Claus Vissing	Holstebro	(0,3)	3	
17	Morten Risager (res)	Slangerup	(ns,0)	0	
18	Jesper Kristiansen (res)	Grindsted	(ns,ns)	ns	

=== U21 Championship ===
Patrick Hougaard won the U21 Championship, held at Munkebo on 12 August.

Pos.	Rider	Points
1	Patrick Hougaard	13+3
2	Morten Risager	11+2
3	Kenneth Hansen	11+1
4	Leon Madsen	12+0
5	Jan Graversen	9+3
6	Nicolai Klindt	9+2
7	Claus Vissing	10+1
8	Peter Juul Larsen	7+0
9	Dannie Soderholm	5+3
10	Klaus Jakobsen	6+2
11	Tommy Pedersen	4+1
12	Jonas Raun	4+0
13	Lars Hansen	4
14	Anders Andersen	4
15	Patrick Nørgaard	4
16	Kenni Arendt	3
17	Jesper Kristiansen	2

== Team ==
=== Danish Speedway League ===
The 2007 season was won by Holsted Tigers for the 12th time. Fjelsted returned to the league after a seven-year absence.

Pos	Team	P	W	D	L	Pts	BP	Total
1	Holsted Tigers	14	12	0	2	38	6	44
2	Slangerup	14	11	0	3	36	6	42
3	Esbjerg Vikings	14	10	0	4	34	5	39
4	Holstebro	14	5	2	7	26	3	29
5	Fjelsted	14	4	1	9	23	3	26
6	Outrup	14	5	0	9	24	2	26
7	Grindsted	14	4	0	10	22	2	24
8	Brovst	14	3	1	10	21	1	22

=== Teams ===
Brovst

- Ryan Sullivan
- Robert Mikołajczak
- Robert Kościecha
- Tom P. Madsen
- Lars Hansen
- Patrick Norgaard
- Lars Vedsted
- Mike Ebaek
- Grzegorz Klopot
- Karol Ząbik
- Claes Nedermark
- Stephan Katt

Esbjerg

- Kenneth Bjerre
- Brian Lyngso
- Mads Korneliussen
- Jesper B Jensen
- Krister Jacobsen
- Bjarne Nilsson
- Johannes Kikkenborg
- Robert Miśkowiak
- Tommy Georgsen

Fjelsted

- Hans Andersen
- Kai Laukkanen
- Manuel Hauzinger
- Norbert Kościuch
- Klaus Jakobsen
- Casper Wortmann
- Peter Kildemand
- Carsten Hansen
- Rene Bach
- Ronnie Jamroży
- Tomasz Jędrzejak

Grindsted

- Jesper Kristiansen
- Anders Andersen
- Henning Bager
- Peter Juul Larsen
- Patrik Olsson
- Nicki Barrett
- Ludvig Lindgren
- Daniel Pytel
- Rene Holm

Holstebro

- Bjarne Pedersen
- Ulrich Ostergaard
- Matej Ferjan
- Leon Madsen
- Jan Graversen
- Thomas Sorensen
- Kenni Arendt Larsen
- Laszlo Szatmari
- Steffen Andersen
- Rune Sola
- Jernej Kolenko
- Tomasz Bajerski

Holsted

- Nicki Pedersen
- Niels Kristian Iversen
- Henrik Møller
- Patrick Hougaard
- Tommy Pedersen
- Alan Marcinkowski
- Dannie Soderholm
- Christian Hefenbrock
- Mathias Schultz
- Claus Vissing

Outrup

- Charlie Gjedde
- Nicolai Klindt
- Piotr Paluch
- Marcin Jędrzejewski
- Daniel Rath
- Kevin Woelbert
- Kim S. Pedersen
- Joerg Tebbe
- Mike Bjoern
- Steffen B. Jespersen
- Kamil Zielinski

Slangerup

- Chris Harris
- Martin Smolinski
- Henrik Vedel
- Grzegorz Walasek
- Daniel Jeleniewski
- Kenneth Kruse Hansen
- Sebastian Alden
- Claus Lauridsen
- Jesper Sogaard Kristiansen
