= 2004 Danish speedway season =

Season of speedway in Denmark

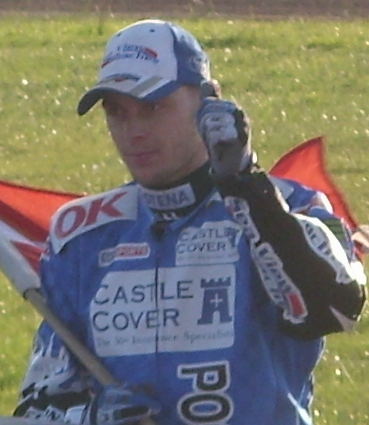
- Bjarne Pedersen won the 2004 Danish Championship.

The 2004 Danish speedway season was the 2004 season of motorcycle speedway in Denmark.

== Individual ==
=== Individual Championship ===
The 2004 Danish Individual Speedway Championship was the 2004 edition of the Danish Individual Speedway Championship. The final was at Holsted on 23 April. The title was won by Bjarne Pedersen.

Final

Pos.	Rider	Team	Points	Total	Race off
1	Bjarne Pedersen	Holsted	(3,3,3,3,2)	14	
2	Nicki Pedersen	Holsted	(3,2,2,3,3)	13	3
3	Kenneth Bjerre	Slangerup	(2,3,3,2,3)	13	2
4	Hans Andersen	Fredericia	(3,1,2,3,3)	12	
5	Charlie Gjedde	Fredericia	(2,2,3,1,2)	10	
6	Jesper B. Jensen	Slangerup	(1,3,2,3,0)	9	
7	Niels Kristian Iversen	Holsted	(2,0,3,2,1)	8	
8	Mads Korneliussen	Slangerup	(2,2,1,0,3)	8	
9	Henning Bager	Outrup	(1,2,1,2,2)	8	
10	Morten Risager	Fredericia	( 3,3,1,0,0)	7	
11	Ronni Pedersen	Slangerup	(0,1,2,1,2)	6	
12	Henrik Møller	Holsted	(0,1,1,2,1)	5	
13	Brian Lyngsö	Kronejylland	(1,1,0,1,1)	4	
14	Rune Knudsen	Slangerup	(0,0,0,1,1)	2	
15	Tommy Georgsen	Outrup	(1,0,0,0,0)	1	
16	Jesper Kristiansen	Grindsted	(0,0,0,0,0)	0	

Key Each heat has four riders, 3 points for a heat win, 2 for 2nd, 1 for third and 0 for last

=== U21 Championship ===
Kenneth Bjerre won the U21 Championship for the second successive year. The final was held at Brovst.

Pos.	Rider	Team	Points
1	Kenneth Bjerre	Slangerup	14+3
2	Mads Korneliussen	Slangerup	14+2
3	Morten Risager	Fredericia	13+3
4	Henrik Møller	Holsted	13+2
5	Rune Knudsen	Slangerup	11
6	Jesper Kristiansen	Grinsted	9
7	Casper Wortmann	Holsted	7
8	Klaus Jakobsen	Slangerup	6
9	Steen Jensen	Brovst	6
10	Dannie Soderholm	Fjelsted	5
11	Claus Vissing	Holsted	5
12	Daniel Teglers	Slangerup	5
13	Anders Andersen	Grindsted	4
14	Jan Graversen	Glumso	4
15	Lars Hansen	Holsted	3
16	Tommy Georgsen	Outrup	0

== Team ==
=== Danish Speedway League ===
The 2004 season was won by Holsted for the 10th time.

Pos	Team	P	W	D	L	Pts	BP	Total
1	Holsted	10	9	0	1	28	5	33
2	Slangerup	10	8	0	2	26	4	30
3	Fredericia	10	5	0	5	20	2	22
4	Brovst	10	3	0	7	16	2	18
5	Outrup	10	3	0	7	16	1	17
6	Kronjylland	10	2	0	8	13	0	13

=== Teams ===
Brovst

- Steen Jensen
- Sebastian Bengtson
- Pawel Hlib
- Karsten Højhus
- Mads Georgsen
- Piotr Paluch
- Karol Baran
- Rafal Wilk
- Rafal Tojanowski
- Pawel Miesiac
- Robert Sawina
- Jacek Rempała
- Karol Ząbik

Fredericia

- Hans Andersen
- Brian Karger
- Charlie Gjedde
- Morten Risager
- Mads B. Pedersen
- Joachim Bundgaard
- Ulrich Østergaard
- Frede Schott
- Christian Hefenbrock

Holsted

- Nicki Pedersen
- Bjarne Pedersen
- Niels Kristian Iversen
- Charlie Møller
- Casper Wortmann
- Henrik Møller
- Claus Vissing
- Lars Hansen
- Christian K. Jacobsen
- Sebastian Ulamek
- Damian Balinski
- John Jørgensen

Kronjylland

- Mirko Wolter
- Tomasz Jedrzejak
- Jorg Pingel
- Brian Lyngsø
- Matthias Kröger
- Mirosław Jabłoński
- Krzysztof Jabłoński
- Roman Poważny
- Robert Kosciecha
- Henrik Kristensen
- Jesper Thygesen

Outrup

- Henning Bager
- Kristian Lund
- Morten Gorm
- Tommy Georgsen
- Nicolai Klindt
- Nicklas Lund
- Rune Holta
- Kaj Laukkanen
- Stephan Katt
- Michal Raikowski
- Erik Andersson
- Robert Flis
- Jarosław Hampel
- Attila Stefani

Slangerup

- Jesper B. Jensen
- Ronni Pedersen
- Kenneth Bjerre
- Mads Korneliussen
- Rune Knudsen
- Klaus Jakobsen
- Daniel Teglers
- Kenneth Kruse Hansen
- Lars Munkedal
- Mattias Nilsson
- Adrian Miedzinski
- Leon Madsen
- Patrick Hougaard
