= 2003 Danish speedway season =

Season of speedway in Denmark

The 2003 Danish speedway season was the 2003 season of motorcycle speedway in Denmark.

== Individual ==
=== Individual Championship ===
The 2003 Danish Individual Speedway Championship was the 2003 edition of the Danish Individual Speedway Championship. The final was at Holsted on 3 April. The title was won by Nicki Pedersen for the second time.

The Championship formed part of the 2004 Speedway Grand Prix Qualification with 5 riders qualifying for the Scandinavian Final.

Final

Pos.	Rider	Team	Points	Total	Race off
1	Nicki Pedersen	Holsted	(3,3,3,3,3)	15	
2	Hans Andersen	Brovst	(2,3,3,3,1)	12	3
3	Jesper B. Jensen	Holsted	(2,3,2,3,2)	12	2
4	Bjarne Pedersen	Holsted	(3,0,3,2,3)	11	
5	Kenneth Bjerre	Slangerup	(3,1,2,2,3)	11	
6	Ronni Pedersen	Slangerup	(2,2,3,0,3)	10	
7	Charlie Gjedde	Outrup	(2,1,2,3,0)	8	
8	Niels Kristian Iversen	Holsted	(3,0,1,2,2)	8	
9	Martin Vinther	Brovst	(1,2,1,1,2)	7	
10	Tom P. Madsen	Brovst	(0,2,0,2,2)	6	
11	Ulrich Østergaard	Holsted	(1,1,2,1,1)	6	
12	Henning Bager	Holsted	(1,2,1,0,1)	5	
13	Mads B. Pedersen	Slangerup	(0,1,1,1,1)	4	
14	Claus Kristensen	Slangerup	(0,3,0,0,0)	3	
15	Steven R. Andersen	Outrup	(1,0,0,1,0)	2	
16	Rene Holm	Grindsted	(0,0,0,0,0)	0	

Key - Each heat has four riders, 3 points for a heat win, 2 for 2nd, 1 for third and 0 for last

=== U21 Championship ===
Kenneth Bjerre won the U21 Championship, held at Kronjylland on 17 August.

Pos.	Rider	Team	Points
1	Kenneth Bjerre	Slangerup	14+3
2	Niels Kristian Iversen	Holsted	15+2
3	Rune Knudsen	Slangerup	14+1
4	Henrik Møller	Holsted	12+0
5	Mads Korneliussen	Slangerup	10
6	Mads B. Pedersen	Slangerup	9
7	Steven R. Andersen	Outrup	9
8	Charlie Moller	Holsted	8
9	Morten Risager	Slangerup	8
10	Steen Jensen	Brovst	6
11	Kristian Lund	Outrup	5
12	Casper Wortmann	Holsted	5
13	Jesper Kristiansen	Grinsted	5
14	Rene Holm	Vojens	2
15	Jan Graversen	Glumso	1
16	Morten Gorm	Outrup	0
17	Kent Mortensen	Glumso	0

== Team ==
=== Danish Speedway League ===
The 2003 season was won by Holsted for the 9th time.

Pos	Team	P	W	D	L	Pts
1	Holsted	8	7	0	1	26
2	Slangerup	8	6	0	2	23
3	Brovst	8	4	0	4	18
4	Outrup	8	2	1	5	14
5	Kronjylland	8	0	1	7	9

=== Teams ===
Brovst

- Brian Karger
- Hans Andersen
- Steen Jensen
- Tom P. Madsen
- Martin Vinther
- Karsten Højhus
- Tomasz Bajerski
- Jacek Rempała

Holsted

- Nicki Pedersen
- Jesper B. Jensen
- Bjarne Pedersen
- Henning Bager
- Niels Kristian Iversen
- Charlie Møller
- Jesper Kristiansen
- Casper Wortmann
- Ulrich Østergaard
- Henrik Møller

Kronjylland

- Mirko Wolter
- Tomasz Jedrzejak
- Rene Holm
- Brian Lyngsø
- Jannik Leerberg
- Matthias Kröger
- Thomas B. Poulsen
- Mirosław Jabłoński
- Krzysztof Jabłoński
- Leon D. Madsen

Outrup

- Charlie Gjedde
- Kristian Lund
- Steven R. Andersen
- Morten Gorm
- Tommy Georgsen
- Christian Krupa
- Rune Holta
- Frede Schott

Slangerup

- Ronni Pedersen
- Kenneth Bjerre
- Mads Korneliussen
- Mads B. Pedersen
- Rune Knudsen
- Claus Kristensen
- Morten Risager
