= 2006 Danish speedway season =

Season of speedway in Denmark

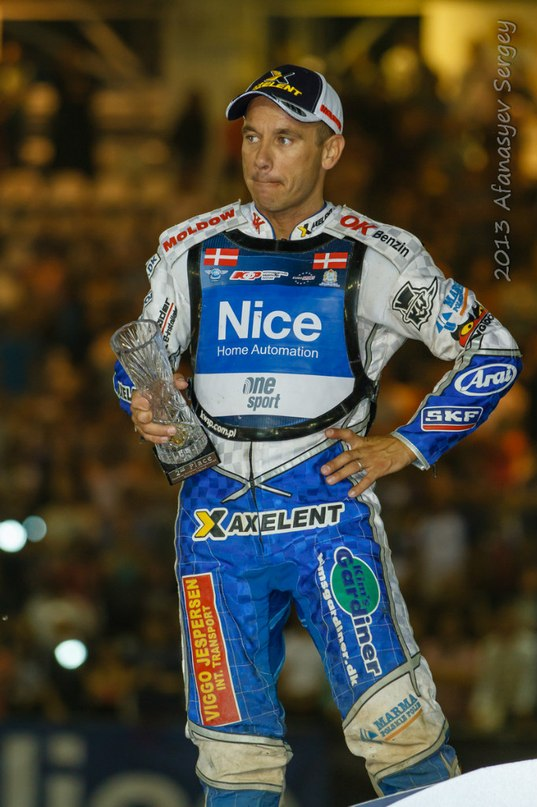
- Nicki Pedersen won the Danish title for the fourth time and helped Holsted win the league.

The 2006 Danish speedway season was the 2006 season of motorcycle speedway in Denmark.

== Individual ==
=== Individual Championship ===
The 2006 Danish Individual Speedway Championship was the 2006 edition of the Danish Individual Speedway Championship. The final was staged over two rounds, at Outrup on 30 June and at Holsted on 4 August. The title was won by Nicki Pedersen for the fourth time.

Final

Pos.	Rider	Team	Total
1	Nicki Pedersen	Holsted	37
2	Hans Andersen		33
3	Kenneth Bjerre	Slangerup	30
4	Bjarne Pedersen		28
5	Niels Kristian Iversen	Holsted	26
6	Henrik Møller	Holsted	24
7	Charlie Gjedde	Outrup	22
8	Mads Korneliussen	Slangerup	22
9	Patrick Hougaard	Holsted	17
10	Nicolai Klindt	Outrup	14
11	Ulrich Østergaard	Holsted	16
12	Lars Hansen	Brovst	16
13	Jonas Raun	Holsted	13
14	Leon Madsen	Slangerup	12
15	Steven Andersen	Brovst	6
16	Anders Andersen	Brovst	5
17	Patrick Nørgaard	Outrup	2
18	Klaus Jakobsen	Slangerup	0

=== U21 Championship ===
Nicolai Klindt won the U21 Championship, held at Holstebro on 15 August.

Pos.	Rider	Points
1	Nicolai Klindt	14+3
2	Patrick Hougaard	12+2
3	Klaus Jakobsen	12+1
4	Kenneth Kruse Hansen	12+0
5	Dannie Soderholm	10+3
6	Claus Vissing	9+2
7	Jonas Raun	9+1
8	Anders Andersen	8+0
9	Leon Madsen	8+3
10	Jan Graversen	8+2
11	Peter Juul Larsen	5+1
12	Tommy Pedersen	3+0
13	Kenni Arendt Larsen	3
14	Krister Jacobsen	3
15	Mike Ebaek	3
16	Simon Frahm	1
17	Mads Georgsen	0

== Team ==
=== Danish Speedway League ===
The 2006 season was won by Holsted Tigers for the 11th time. Only four teams lined up during the season which resulted in a play off round to determine the champion team.

Pos	Team	P	W	D	L	Pts	BP	Total
1	Holsted	6	6	0	0	18	3	21
2	Outrup	6	3	1	2	13	2	15
3	Slangerup	6	2	1	3	11	1	12
4	Brovst	6	0	0	6	6	0	6

Semi finals

Team	Score	Riders
Holsted; Brovst	64–35	Iversen 17, N Pedersen 14, Møller 12, Hougaard 8, Raun 7, Vissing 6 Kościecha 14, Katt 8, L Hansen 7, Kröger 5, S Andersen 2, Frahm 0
Outrup; Slangerup	44–52	Klindt 14, Paluch 10, Buczkowski 6, Soderholm 5, K Larsen 5, Jędrzejewski 4 Harris 15, K Bjerre 13, Kl Jakobsen 8, Vedel 6, Madsen 6, K Hansen 4

Final

Team	Score	Riders
Slangerup; Holsted	48–51	Jakobsen 11, Harris 10, Korneliussen 9, K Hansen 7, Madsen 6, Cieślewicz 5 N Pedersen 19, Iversen 11, Møller 8, Soderholm 7, Vissing 4, Hougaard 2
Holsted; Slangerup	50–46	N Pedersen 18, Iversen 14, Møller 7, Vissing 6, Soderholm 3, Hougaard 2 Korneliussen 9, K Hansen 8, Harris 8, Madsen 8, Jakobsen 7, Jesper B Jensen 6

=== Teams ===
Brovst

- Robert Kosciecha
- Stephan Katt
- Matthias Kröger
- Simon Frahm
- Morten Risager
- Jacek Rempała
- Pawel Hlib
- Anders Andersen
- Steve R Andersen
- Lars Hansen
- Mariusz Puszakowski
- Steen Jensen
- Claes Nedermark
- Karol Ząbik
- Jan Graversen

Holsted

- Nicki Pedersen
- Niels Kristian Iversen
- Henrik Møller
- Ulrich Østergaard
- Jonas Raun
- Claus Vissing
- Patrick Hougaard
- Dannie Soderholm
- Peter Ljung
- Casper Wortmann

Outrup

- Charlie Gjedde
- Nicolai Klindt
- Patrick Nørgaard
- Marcin Jędrzejewski
- Krzysztof Buczkowski
- Piotr Paluch
- Rune Sola
- Jarosław Łukaszewski
- Kenni Arendt Larsen
- Mariusz Staszewski
- Robert Flis
- Henning Bager

Slangerup

- Kenneth Bjerre
- Mads Korneliussen
- Leon Madsen
- Klaus Jakobsen
- Chris Harris
- Jesper B. Jensen
- Henrik Vedel
- Kenneth Kruse Hansen
- Adrian Miedzinski
- Mattias Nilsson
