= 2002 Danish speedway season =

Season of speedway in Denmark

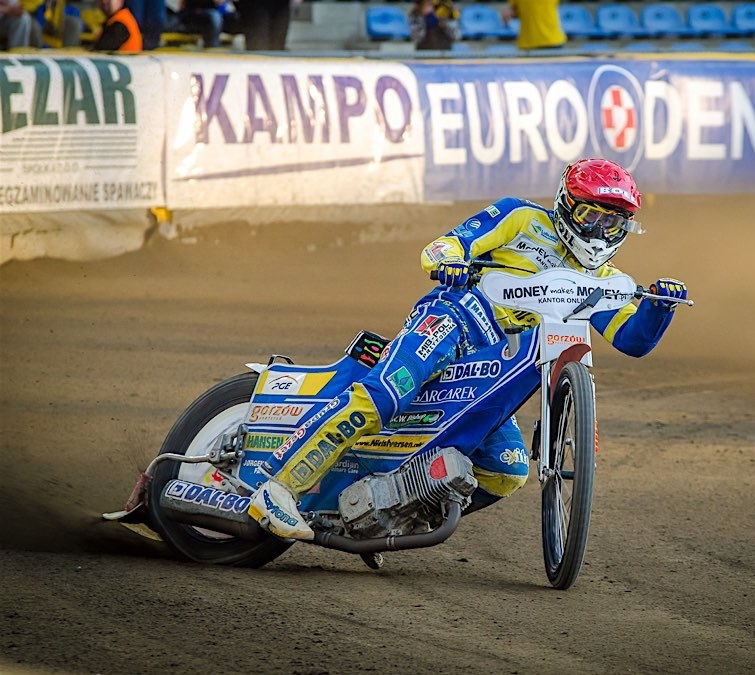
- Niels Kristian Iversen became the first U21 champion and was part of the Holsted team.

The 2002 Danish speedway season was the 2002 season of motorcycle speedway in Denmark.

== Individual ==
=== Individual Championship ===
The 2002 Danish Individual Speedway Championship was the 2002 edition of the Danish Individual Speedway Championship. The final was at Outrup on 2 May. The title was won by Nicki Pedersen for the first time.

The Championship formed part of the 2003 Speedway Grand Prix Qualification with 5 riders qualifying for the Scandinavian Final.

Final

Pos.	Rider	Team	Points	Total	Race off
1	Nicki Pedersen	Brovst	(2,3,3,3,2)	13	
2	Bjarne Pedersen	Vojens	(3,2,1,1,0)	11	3
3	Hans Andersen	Brovst	(1,2,3,3,2)	11	2
4	Charlie Gjedde	Holsted	(3,2,1,2,3)	11	1
5	Ronni Pedersen	Slangerup	(3,2,0,2,3)	10	3
6	Niels Kristian Iversen	Holsted	(3,3,2,0,2)	10	2
7	Jesper B. Jensen	Holsted	(1,3,2,3,1)	10	1
8	Gert Handberg	Brovst	(0,1,3,3,0)	7	
9	Kenneth Bjerre	Slangerup	(2,1,2,2,0)	7	
10	Henning Bager	Holsted	(3,1,0,1,1)	6	
11	Claus Kristensen	Kronjylland	(1,0,3,0,1)	5	
12	Brian Andersen	Kronjylland	(0,1,2,0,2)	5	
13	Steven R. Andersen	Herning	(2,0,1,1,1)	5	
14	Mads Korneliussen	Slangerup	(1,2,1,1,0)	5	
15	Tom P. Madsen	Holsted	(0,0,0,1,3)	4	
16	Mads B. Pedersen	Slangerup	(0,0,0,0,0)	0	

Key - Each heat has four riders, 3 points for a heat win, 2 for 2nd, 1 for third and 0 for last

=== U21 Championship ===
From 2002, the format of the Junior Championship changed to Under 21 for the first time. The final was held at Outrup on 18 August. Niels Kristian Iversen won the U21 Championship.

Pos.	Rider	Team	Points
1	Niels Kristian Iversen	Holsted	14
2	Kenneth Bjerre	Slangerup	13+3
3	Henning Bager	Holsted	13=2
4	Mads Korneliussen	Slangerup	12
5	Rune Knudsen	Slangerup	9
6	Steen Jensen	Brovst	9
7	Charlie Moller	Holsted	8
8	Steven R. Andersen	Outrup	8
9	Kristian Lund	Outrup	5
10	Henrik Møller	Outrup	5
11	Jesper Kristiansen	Holsted	5
12	Lasse S. Andersen	Grinsted	5
13	Mads B. Pedersen	Slangerup	4
14	Rasmus Chritiansen	Outrup	3
15	Morten Gorm	Outrup	2
16	Tommy Georgsen	Outrup	1

== Team ==
=== Danish Speedway League ===
The 2002 season was won by Holsted for the 8th time.

Pos	Team	P	W	D	L	Pts
1	Holsted	10	8	0	2	26
2	Slangerup	10	7	0	3	24
3	Outrup	10	7	0	3	23
4	Brovst	10	6	0	4	22
5	Vojens	10	1	0	9	12
6	Kronjylland	10	1	0	9	12

=== Teams ===
Brovst

- Nicki Pedersen
- Hans Andersen
- Gert Handberg
- Steen Jensen
- Ulrich Ostergaard
- Martin Vinther
- Rune Sola
- Mike B. Johnsen
- Karsten Hojhus

Holsted

- Jesper B. Jensen
- Henning Bager
- Niels Kristian Iversen
- Flemming Jacobsen
- Charlie Gjedde
- Tom P. Madsen
- Charlie Moller
- Jesper Kristiansen
- Ronnie Rene Henningsen
- Jacek Rempała

Kronjylland

- Brian Andersen
- Claus Kristensen
- Matthias Kröger
- Jörg Pingel
- Andre Pollehn
- Mirko Wolter
- Kristian Andersen
- Brian Lyngsø
- Tim Korneliussen
- Christian Hefenbrock
- Rene Madsen
- Thomas B. Poulsen

Outrup

- Kristian Lund
- Steven R. Andersen
- Hans Clausen
- Frede Schott
- Rasmus Chritiansen
- Robert Dados
- Kaj Laukkanen
- Morten Gorm
- Rune Holta
- Tommy Georgsen

Slangerup

- Ronni Pedersen
- Kenneth Bjerre
- Mads Korneliussen
- Mads B. Pedersen
- Kim Brandt
- Rune Knudsen
- Daniel Teglers
- Mattias Nilsson
- Daniel Rath
- Carsten Hansen

Vojens

- Bjarne Pedersen
- Sebastian Ulamek
- Brian Karger
- Damian Baliński
- Claus Kristensen
- Jesper Stentoft
- Rene Holm
- Marius Rokeberg
- Kenneth Borgenhaug
- Henry Siewers
- Bjorn Danielczik
