= 2010 Danish speedway season =

Season of speedway in Denmark

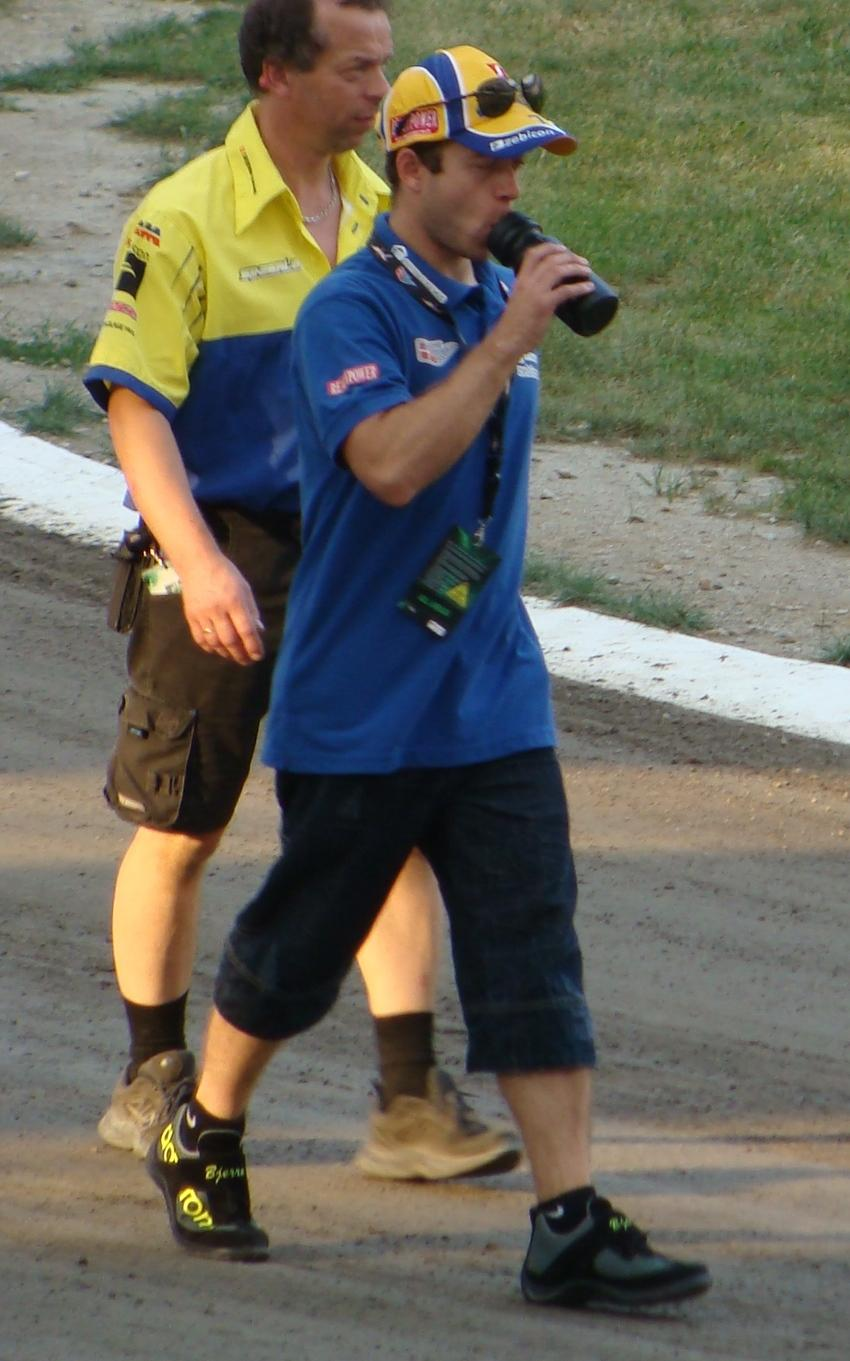
- Kenneth Bjerre became Danish champion and led Slangerup to the league title.

== Individual ==
=== Individual Championship ===
The 2010 Danish Individual Speedway Championship was the 2010 edition of the Danish Individual Speedway Championship. The final was staged over two rounds, at Esbjerg and Holsted, and was won by Kenneth Bjerre for the first time.

The competition started with two quarter finals, with three progressing to the semi-final from the first and four from the second. The top nine then officially qualified from the semi-final, joining six seeded riders and a wild card in the final series. The final series was held over two rounds, with the top four scorers from the two rounds then competing in a Grand Final. The points from the Grand Final were then added to the total score and the overall winner was the rider with the most total points.

Quarter finals

- 25 April 2010, held at Outrup

Pos.	Rider	Points	Details
1	Philip Marchéwka Tirsdal	13	(3,2,2,3,3)
2	Lasse Bjerre	11	(2,2,3,1,3)
3	Henrik Vedel	11	(3,2,2,2,2)
4	Klaus Jakobsen	10	(1,3,1,2,3)
5	Mikkel Bech Jensen	10	(2,3,1,3,1)
6	Michael Palm Toft	10	(0,1,3,3,3)
7	Johannes Kikkenborg	10	(2,3,3,E,2)
8	Simon Nielsen	9	(X,1,3,3,2)
9	Nicklas Porsing	8	(3,3,2,F,-)
10	Marc Randrup	6	(0,2,2,2,0)
11	Mikkel Michelsen	5	(2,1,0,1,1)
12	Nicki Barrett	5	(1,T,1,1,2)
13	Brian Lyngsøe	3	(3,0,T,R,-)
14	Michael Vissing	3	(X,1,F,2,E)
15	Michael Melchiorsen	3	(1,0,1,1,-)
16	Jacob Bukhave	2	(0,1,1)
17	Tommy Georgsen	1	(1,R,R,R)
16	Lasse Kragh	0	(0,0,0)

- 25 April 2010, held at Outrup

Pos.	Rider	Points	Details
1	Claus Vissing	14	(3,3,3,2,3)
2	Peter Kildemand	13	(3,3,3,1,3)
3	Kenni Larsen	13	(3,2,3,3,2)
4	René Bach	12	(3,2,3,2,2)
5	Casper Wortmann	11	(2,3,X,3,3)
6	Kenneth Hansen	10	(1,3,2,3,1)
7	Thomas Jørgensen	7	(2,2,1,1,2)
8	Kenneth Dryvig Jensen	7	(2,1,1,0,3)
9	Jesper Kristiansen	6	(1,1,2,2,0)
10	Jesper Søgaard-Kristiansen	5	(F,0,2,3,R)
11	Mikkel Salomonsen	5	(0,1,2,0,2)
12	Jonas Andersen	5	(X,2,2,F,1)
13	Patrick Bjerregaard	1	(R,1,0,R,-)
14	Kasper Lykke Nielsen	1	(X,F,M,F,1)
15	Peter Juul Larsen	1	(X,1)
16	Steffen Andersen	0	(M,0)
17	Claes Nedermark	0	(X)

Semi-finals

- 22 May 2010, held at Holstebro

Pos.	Rider	Points	Details
1	Michael Jepsen Jensen (Vojens)	13	(3,3,1,3,3)
2	Bjarne Pedersen (Holstebro)	13	(3,2,3,2,3)
3	Peter Kildemand (Fjelsted)	12	(2,3,3,3,1)
4	Leon Madsen (Brovst)	12	(3,3,2,2,2)
5	Lasse Bjerre (Slangerup)	10	(2,3,0,3,2)
6	Ulrich Østergaard (Holsted)	9	(1,2,2,1,3)
7	Morten Risager (Outrup)	9	(1,2,3,1,2)
8	Mads Korneliussen (Outrup)	9	(2,2,2,2,1)
9	Claus Vissing (Fjelsted)	8	(2,1,2,0,3)
10	Kenni Larsen (Fjelsted)	7	(3,0,F,3,1)
11	René Bach (Fjelsted)	5	(R,R,3,0,2)
12	Philip Marchéwka Tirsdal (Slangerup)	5	(1,1,1,2,0)
13	Johannes Kikkenborg (Esbjerg)	3	(1,0,1,0,1)
14	Klaus Jakobsen (Vojens)	2	(0,1,0,1,0)
15	Henrik Vedel (Glumso)	2	(0,0,1,1,0)
16	Casper Wortmann (Fjelsted)	1	(0,1,0,0,0)

Final series

Round one

- 28 May 2010, held at Esbjerg

Pos.	Rider	Points	Details
1	Leon Madsen	14	(3,3,2,3,3)
2	Kenneth Bjerre	14	(3,3,3,3,2)
3	Nicolai Klindt	11	(1,3,1,3,3)
4	Hans N. Andersen	10	(E,2,3,2,3)
5	Kenni Larsen	9	(3,1,3,2,0)
6	Nicki Pedersen	9	(1,1,3,3,1)
7	Bjarne Pedersen	9	(2,3,1,1,2)
8	Patrick Hougaard	9	(2,2,1,2,2)
9	Mads Korneliussen	6	(3,1,0,0,2)
10	Morten Risager	6	(E,2,2,2,0)
11	Claus Vissing	5	(0,2,2,1,X)
12	Michael Jepsen Jensen	5	(2,1,0,1,1)
13	Peter Kildemand	4	(1,0,0,X,3)
14	Ulrich Østergaard	4	(2,0,1,0,1)
15	René Bach	3	(0,0,2,0,1)
16	Lasse Bjerre	2	(1,0,0,1,0)

Round two

- 6 August 2010, held at Holsted

Pos.	Rider	Points	Details
1	Kenneth Bjerre	17	(3,3,3,3,2,3)
2	Bjarne Pedersen	16	(3,3,3,3,3,1)
3	Hans N. Andersen	15	(3,3,2,2,3,2)
4	Mads Korneliussen	11	(2,1,3,3,2)
5	Michael Jepsen Jensen	10	(1,1,3,2,3)
6	Leon Madsen	9	(2,2,2,R,3,0)
7	Kenni Larsen	9	(3,1,1,2,2)
8	Patrick Hougaard	7	(X,2,2,1,2)
9	Nicolai Klindt	6	(T,2,X,3,1)
10	Ulrich Østergaard	6	(2,3,X,0,1)
11	René Bach	4	(1,0,1,2,1)
12	Lasse Bjerre	4	(1,0,2,1,0)
13	Claus Vissing	3	(0,0,1,1,1)
14	Philip Marchéwka Tirsdal	2	(2,0,0,0,0)
15	Morten Risager	2	(0,2)
16	Johannes Kikkenborg	2	(1,0,1,0,0)
17	Peter Kildemand	0	(X.X)
18	Niels Kristian Iversen	0	(X)

Final classification

Pos.	Rider	Points		
1	Kenneth Bjerre (Slangerup)	31	14	17
2	Hans N. Andersen (Vissen Bjerg)	25	10	15
3	Bjarne Pedersen (Holstebro)	25	9	16
4	Leon Madsen (Brovst)	23	14	9
5	Kenni Larsen (Vojens)	18	9	9
6	Nicolai Klindt (Outrup)	17	11	6
7	Mads Korneliussen (Esbjerg)	17	6	11
8	Patrick Hougaard (Vojens)	16	9	7
9	Michael Jepsen Jensen (Vojens)	15	5	10
10	Ulrich Østergaard (Holsted)	10	4	6
11	Nicki Pedersen (Holsted)	9	9	–
12	Morten Risager (Holsted)	8	6	2
13	Claus Vissing (Fjelsted)	8	5	3
14	René Bach (Fjelsted)	7	3	4
15	Lasse Bjerre (Slangerup)	6	2	4
16	Peter Kildemand (Fjelsted)	4	4	0
17	Philip Marchéwka Tirsdal (Slangerup)	2	–	2
-	Johannes Kikkenborg (Esbjerg)	2	–	2
19	Niels Kristian Iversen (Holsted)	0	–	0

=== U21 Championship ===
René Bach won the U21 Championship at Slangerup on 19 September.

Pos.	Rider	Points
1	René Bach	15
2	Michael Jepsen Jensen	14
3	Patrick Hougaard	13
4	Simon Nielsen	11
5	Mikkel B. Jensen	10
6	Lasse Bjerre	10
7	Mikkel Michelsen	9
8	Jonas B. Andersen	8
9	Klaus Jakobsen	7
10	Mikkel Salomonsen	6
11	Kasper Lykke Nielsen	4
12	Marc Randrup	4
13	Dennis S. Thostensen	3
14	Patrick Bjerregaard	3
15	Michael Melchiorsen	2
16	Patrick Nørgaard	1

== Team ==
=== Danish Speedway League ===
The Danish Speedway League was won by Slangerup for the third time.

Pos	Team	P	W	D	L	Pts	BP	Total
1	Slangerup	14	9	2	3	34	6	40
2	Outrup	14	9	1	4	33	3	36
3	Vojens	14	7	2	5	30	4	34
4	Holsted Tigers	14	7	0	7	28	4	32
5	Brovst	14	7	0	7	28	4	32
6	Holstebro	14	5	1	8	25	3	28
7	Esbjerg Vikings	14	4	2	8	24	2	26
8	Fjelsted	14	3	2	9	22	2	24

=== Teams ===
Brovst

- (Poland) Rafał Dobrucki
- (Poland) Adrian Miedziński
- (Denmark) Leon Madsen
- (Denmark) Thomas Jørgensen
- (Poland) Daniel Pytel
- (Poland) Patryk Dudek
- (Denmark) Jonas B. Andersen
- (Denmark) Steen Jensen
- (Czech Republic) Zdeněk Simota

Esbjerg

- (Sweden) Andreas Jonsson
- (Poland) Piotr Protasiewicz
- (Australia) Leigh Adams
- (Finland) Joonas Kylmäkorpi
- (Poland) Zbigniew Suchecki
- (Denmark) Peter Juul Larsen
- (United States) Greg Hancock
- (Denmark) Brian Lyngsö
- (Denmark) Johannes Kikkenborg
- (Poland) Marcin Rempała
- (Poland) Mateusz Szczepaniak
- (Denmark) Dannie Soderholm
- (Poland) Piotr Świst

Fjelsted

- (Denmark) Peter Kildemand
- (Sweden) Linus Sundström
- (Denmark) Simon Nielsen
- (Poland) Tomasz Jędrzejak
- (Denmark) Claus Vissing
- (Poland) Sebastian Ułamek
- (Denmark) Nicki Barrett
- (Slovenia) Samo Kukovica
- (Poland) Tomasz Chrzanowski

Holstebro

- (Denmark) Bjarne Pedersen
- (Ukraine) Aleksandr Loktaev
- (Ukraine) Andriej Karpov
- (Poland) Tomasz Gapiński
- (Denmark) Nikolaj Busk Jakobsen
- (Denmark) Patrick Nørgaard
- (Denmark) Henning Bager
- (Poland) Krzysztof Buczkowski
- (Denmark) Steffen B Jespersen
- (Denmark) Michael Melchiorsen
- (Denmark) Casper Wortmann

Holsted

- (Denmark) Niels Kristian Iversen
- (Denmark) Nicki Pedersen
- (Denmark) Nicklas Porsing
- (Australia) Troy Batchelor
- (Germany) Kevin Wölbert
- (Denmark) Patrick Bjerregaard
- (Denmark) Morten Risager
- (Denmark) Ulrich Østergaard
- (Poland) Damian Baliński
- (Sweden) Dennis Andersson
- (Denmark) Krister Jacobsen
- (Poland) Piotr Pawlicki Jr.
- (Poland) Mariusz Staszewski

Outrup

- (Denmark) Nicolai Klindt
- (Denmark) Mads Korneliussen
- (Denmark) Michael Palm Toft
- (Poland) Artur Mroczka
- (Poland) Grzegorz Walasek
- (Denmark) Claes Nedermark
- (Sweden) Antonio Lindbäck

Slangerup

- (Denmark) Jesper B. Monberg
- (Denmark) Kenneth Kruse Hansen
- (Denmark) René Bach
- (Denmark) Mikkel Michelsen
- (Denmark) Lasse Bjerre
- (Denmark) Kenneth Bjerre
- (Australia) Ryan Sullivan
- (Sweden) Daniel Nermark
- (Sweden) Ricky Kling
- (Denmark) Philip Marchéwka Tirsdal
- (Denmark) Henrik Vedel
- (Denmark) Marc Randrup

Vojens

- (Denmark) Hans Andersen
- (Russia) Emil Sayfutdinov
- (Denmark) Michael Jepsen Jensen
- (Denmark) Mikkel Bech
- (Denmark) Klaus Jakobsen
- (Denmark) Kenni Larsen
- (Sweden) Oliver Berntzon
- (Denmark) Patrick Hougaard
- (Poland) Krzysztof Pecyna
- (Poland) Patryk Pawlaszczyk
- (Sweden) Mathias Thörnblom
- (Denmark) Anders Andersen
