= 1978 Danish speedway season =

Season of speedway in Denmark

The 1978 Danish speedway season was the 1978 season of motorcycle speedway in Denmark.

== Individual ==
=== Danish Final (world championship round) ===
Two riders from the Danish final would progress to the Nordic Final as part of the 1978 Individual Speedway World Championship. The final was held on 15 May at Fjelsted, and was won by Bent Rasmussen. Only 2 riders qualified for the Nordic final because Ole Olsen and Finn Thomsen were already seeded through to the Nordic final.

Final

Pos.	Rider	club	Total
1	Bent Rasmussen	Herning	13+3
2	Kristian Præstbro	Esbjerg	13+2
3	Hans Nielsen	Brovst	12+3
4	Mike Lohmann	Hillerød	12+2
5	Alf Busk	Silkeborg	12+1
6	Bo Petersen	Fjelsted	10
7	Finn Rune Jensen	Vojens	9
8	Klaus Lohmann	Hillerød	6
9	Kurt Bøgh	Holsted	4
10	Arne Kruse	Holsted	4
11	Steen Mastrup	Midtsjaellands	4
12	Bent Nørregaard-Jensen	Esbjerg	3
13	Erling Rasmussen	Fredericia	3
14	Gunnar Svendsen	Holsted	3
15	Knud Ellegaard	Esbjerg	2
16	Jens Erik Krause Kjaer	Vojens	1

=== Individual Championship ===
The 1978 Danish Individual Speedway Championship was the 1978 edition of the Danish Individual Speedway Championship. The final was held at Fjelsted on 20 August. The title was won by Hans Nielsen for the first time.

Final

Pos.	Rider	Club	Total
1	Hans Nielsen	Brovst	15
2	Kristian Præstbro	Esbjerg	14
3	Erik Gundersen	Esbjerg	12
4	Mike Lohmann	Hillerød	11
5	Bo Petersen	Fjelsted	10
6	Klaus Lohmann	Hillerød	9
7	Finn Rune Jensen	Vojens	8
8	Gunnar Svendsen	Holsted	8
9	Bent Rasmussen	Herning	7
10	Knud Ellegaard	Esbjerg	6
11	Svend Lund	Esbjerg	6
12	Ernst Bøgh	Holsted	5
13	Jens Henry Nielsen	Brovst	5
14	Finn Londal Jensen	Glumsø	2
15	Kaj Kristiansen	Esbjerg	0
16	Alf Busk	Silkeborg	0

Key - Each heat has four riders, 3 points for a heat win, 2 for 2nd, 1 for third and 0 for last

=== Junior Championship ===
Tommy Knudsen won the Junior Championship.

== Team ==
=== Danish Tournament ===
The 1978 Danish Tournament was won by Holsted Tigers, who became Danish champions for the third successive year.

Division 1 league table

Pos	Team	P	Pts
1	Holsted Tigers	8	21
2	Vikingerne Esbjerg	8	20
3	Ulvene Midtsjaellands	8	10
4	Piraterne Århus	8	6
5	Uldjyderne Herning	8	3

Division 2 league table

Pos	Team	P	Pts
1	Geopards Vojens	8	20
2	Blabjergdrengene Outrup	7	18
3	Leoparderne Fjelsted	7	17
4	Falkene Silkeborg	7	17
5	Klitrengene Esbjerg	8	12
6	Holsted Panthers	7	11
7	Kulsvierne Frederiksborg	7	10
8	Faestningsdrengene Fredericia	8	9
9	Hanerne Hanherred	7	9
10	Løverne Haderslev	7	7
11	Fynborne Odin Odense	7	3
12	Cimbrerne Aalborg	7	3
13	Skansedrengene Fredericia	7	2

Division 3 Group 1

Pos	Team	P	Pts
1	Ulveungerne Midtsjaellands	8	21
2	Rodspaetterne Frederikshavn	8	18
3	Ørnene Silkeborg	8	10
4	Volddrengene Fredericia	8	4
5	Laksene Randers	8	2

Division 3 Group 2

Pos	Team	P	Pts
1	Prinserne Viborg	8	19
2	Jokerne Esbjerg	8	14
3	Drabanterne Frederiksborg	8	11
4	Fighters Vojens	8	11
5	Cometerne Fjelsted	8	6

Division 3 Group 3

Pos	Team	P	Pts
1	Praerieulvene Midtsjaellands	8	23
2	Hvepsene Haderslev	8	14
3	Vestjyderne Outrup	8	10
4	Makrellerne Aabenraa	8	8
5	Lyngdrengene Herning	8	5

Division 3 Group 4

Pos	Team	P	Pts
1	Pythonerne Århus	8	23
2	Raketterne Fjelsted	8	11
3	Urhanerne Herning	8	11
4	Skovtroldene Frederiksborg	8	8
5	Brodrenene Fredericia	8	4
