= 1979 Danish speedway season =

Season of speedway in Denmark

The 1979 Danish speedway season was the 1979 season of motorcycle speedway in Denmark.

== Individual ==
=== Danish Final (world championship round) ===
Four riders from the Danish final would progress to the Nordic Final as part of the 1979 Individual Speedway World Championship. The final was held on 6 May at Fjlested, and was won by Bo Petersen. Only 4 riders qualified for the Nordic final because Ole Olsen was already seeded through to the Nordic final.

Final

Pos.	Rider	Scores	Total
1	Bo Petersen	3,2,3,3,3	14+3
2	Finn Thomsen	3,3,2,3,3	14+2
3	Mike Lohmann	2,2,3,3,2	12+3
4	Hans Nielsen	3,3,2,1,3	12+2
5	Finn Rune Jensen	3,3,3,0,2	11
6	Bent Rasmussen	f,2,3,2,3	10
7	Jens Henry Nielsen	2,3,1,2,2	10
8	Steen Mastrup	2,1,2,1,1	7
9	Helge Hansen	2,1,1,2,0	6
10	Svend Lund	0,1,ef,3,1	5
11	Gunnar Svendsen	1,1,1,1,1	5
12	Finn Londal Jensen	0,0,0,2,2	4
13	Alf Busk	1,2,1,f,-	4
14	Kai Kristiansen	1,0,2,f,-	3
15	Kristian Præstbro	1,ef,-,-,-	1
16	Ernst Bogh	dnr	

=== Individual Championship ===
The 1979 Danish Individual Speedway Championship was the 1979 edition of the Danish Individual Speedway Championship. The final was held at Fredericia on 23 September. The title was won by Ole Olsen for the 11th time.

Final

Pos.	Rider	Total
1	Ole Olsen	14
2	Bo Petersen	13+3
3	Hans Nielsen	13+2
4	Bent Rasmussen	10
5	Kristian Præstbro	10
6	Erik Gundersen	9
7	Mike Lohmann	9
8	Finn Rune Jensen	8
9	Finn Thomsen	6
10	Tommy Knudsen	6
11	Svend Lund	5
12	Jens Henry Nielsen	3
13	Klaus Lohmann	3
14	Finn Lundahl	3
15	Arne Kruse	1
16	Gunnar Svendsen	1

Key - Each heat has four riders, 3 points for a heat win, 2 for 2nd, 1 for third and 0 for last

=== Junior Championship ===
Hans Albert Klinge won the Junior Championship.

== Team ==
=== Danish Tournament ===
The 1979 Danish Tournament was won by Holsted Tigers, who became Danish champions for the fourth successive year.

Division 1 league table

Pos	Team	P	Pts
1	Holsted Tigers	10	29
2	Kulsvierne Frederiksborg	10	25
3	Vikingerne Esbjerg	10	23
4	Leoparderne Fjelsted	10	22
5	Blabjergdrengene Outrup	10	21
6	Falkene Silkeborg	10	21
7	Ulvene Midtsjaellands	10	17
8	Piraterne Århus	10	15
9	Geopards Vojens	10	15
10	Uldjyderne Herning	10	12
11	Hanerne Hanherred	10	11
12	Faestningsdrengene	10	10
13	Holsted Panthers	10	8
14	Klitrengene Esbjerg	10	7
15	Cimbrerne Aalborg	10	3
16	Løverne Haderslev	10	1

Division 2 league table

Pos	Team	P	Pts
1	Rodspaetterne Frederikshavn	10	28
2	Ulveungerne Midtsjaellands	10	26
3	Prinserne Viborg	10	23
4	Hvepsene Haderslev	10	23
5	Drabanterne Frederiksborg	10	21
6	Vestjyderne Outrup	10	19
7	Raketterne Fjelsted	10	18
8	Skovtroldene Frederiksborg	10	17
9	Pythonerne Århus	10	13
10	Fighters Vojens	10	13
11	Cometerne Fjelsted	10	10
12	Ørnene Silkeborg	10	9
13	Urhanerne Herning	10	8
14	Fynborne Odin Odense	10	5
15	Skansedrengene Fredericia	10	4
16	Makrellerne Aabenraa	10	3

Division 3 East league table

Pos	Team	P	Pts
1	Jetterne Amager	8	21
2	Svanerne Munkebo	8	14
3	Stjernerne Fjelsted	8	13
4	Girafdrengene Odense	8	0

Division 3 North league table

Pos	Team	P	Pts
1	Neutronerne Viborg	8	15
2	Hajerne Frederikshavn	8	15
3	Laksene Randers	8	14
4	Ravnene Hanherred	8	4

Division 3 Mid league table

Pos	Team	P	Pts
1	Roverbanden Vissenbjerg/Bred	8	23
2	Jensene Viborg	8	13
3	Satelitterne Fjelsted	8	7
4	Volddrengene Fredericia	8	5
