= 1976 Danish speedway season =

Season of speedway in Denmark

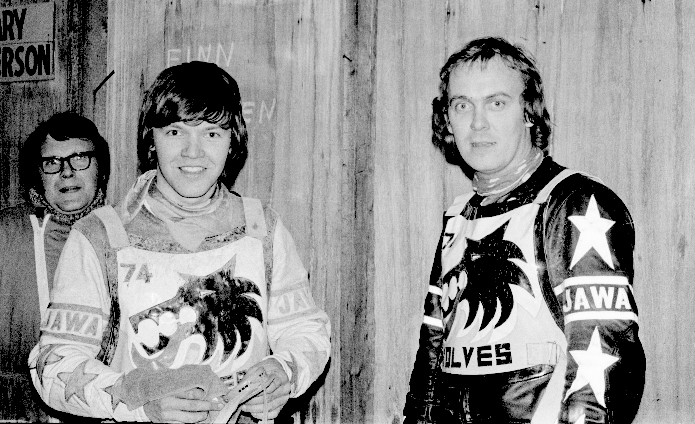
- Finn Thomsen (left) won the Danish World Championship round and Ole Olsen (right) won the Danish title for the 9th time.

The 1976 Danish speedway season was the 1976 season of motorcycle speedway in Denmark.

== Individual ==
=== Danish Final (world championship round) ===
One rider from the Danish final would progress to the Nordic Final as part of the 1976 Individual Speedway World Championship. The final was held on 25 April at Vojens, and was won by Finn Thomsen. Only one rider qualified for the Nordic final because Ole Olsen was already seeded through to the Nordic final.

Final

Pos.	Rider	Club	Total
1	Finn Thomsen	Arhus	15
2	Kurt Bøgh	Holsted	12+3
3	Jan Rene Henningsen	Esjberg	12+2
4	Leif Berlin Rasmusen	Fredericia	12+1
5	Finn Rune Jensen	Vojens	11
6	Gunnar Svendsen	Holsted	10
7	Bent Nørregaard-Jensen	Esjberg	10
8	Mike Lohmann	Fredriksborg	8
9	Kristian Præstbro	Esjberg	8
10	Jens Erik Krause	Arhus	4
11	Knud Ellegaard	Esjberg	4
12	Ernst Bøgh	Holsted	4
13	Erling Rasmussen	Fredericia	3
14	Godtfred Andreasen	Fredericia	3
15	Jorgen Walther Johansen	Fredriksborg	2
16	Kaj Kristensen	Esjberg	2

=== Individual Championship ===
The 1976 Danish Individual Speedway Championship was the 1976 edition of the Danish Individual Speedway Championship. The final was held at Vojens on 15 August. The title was won by Ole Olsen for the 9th time.

Final

Pos.	Rider	Club	Total
1	Ole Olsen	Vojens	15
2	Finn Thomsen	Arhus	14
3	Jens Erik Krause Kjaer	Arhus	13
4	Mike Lohmann	Frederiksborg	12
5	Kurt Bøgh	Holsted	11
6	Gunnar Svendsen	Holsted	9
7	Finn Rune Jensen	Vojens	8
8	Knud Ellegaard	Esbjerg	7
9	Preben Rosenkilde	Vojens	7
10	Kaj Kristiansen	Esjberg	6
11	Erling Rasmussen	Fredericia	5
12	Jorgen Walther Johansen	Frederiksborg	4
13	Frank Hansen	Brovst	3
14	Leif Berlin Rasmussen	Fredericia	2
15	Niels E. Pedersen	Fredericia	1
16	Otto Larsen	Fredericia	0

Key - Each heat has four riders, 3 points for a heat win, 2 for 2nd, 1 for third and 0 for last

=== Junior Championship ===
Hans Nielsen won the Junior Championship.

== Team ==
=== Danish Tournament ===
The 1976 Danish Tournament was won by Holsted Tigers, who became Danish champions for the first time.

In 1976, the decision was made by the Hillerød club to move their teams to Slangerup. The teams were formerly suffixed by the name Hillerød but now used the name Frederiksborg.

Division 1 league table

Pos	Team	P	Pts
1	Holsted Tigers	8	20
2	Vikingerne Esbjerg	8	17
3	Piraterne Århus	8	12
4	Faestningsdrengene Fredericia	8	8
5	Kulsvierne Frederiksborg	8	3

Division 2 Group 1

Pos	Team	P	Pts
1	Uldjyderne Herning	8	21
2	Ulvene Midtsjaellands	8	20
3	Klitrengene Esbjerg	8	10
4	Fynborne Odin Odense	8	9
5	Hvepsene Haderslev	8	0

Division 2 Group 2

Pos	Team	P	Pts
1	Skansedrengene Fredericia	8	22
2	Falkene Silkeborg	8	14
3	Løverne Haderslev	8	10
4	Cimbrerne Aalborg	8	9
5	Jokerne Esbjerg	8	5

Division 3 Group 1

Pos	Team	P	Pts
1	Laksene Randers	8	21
2	Ulveungerne Midtsjaellands	8	18
3	Fighters Vojens	8	12
4	Esserne Esbjerg	8	7
5	Smedene Aalborg	8	2

Division 3 Group 2

Pos	Team	P	Pts
1	Skovtroldene Frederiksborg	8	21
2	Volddrengene Fredericia	8	20
3	Rodspaetterne Frederikshavn	8	9
4	Fangeldrengene Odin Odense	8	8
5	Ravnene Hanherred	8	2

Division 3 Group 3

Pos	Team	P	Pts
1	Holsted Panthers	8	19
2	Pythonerne Århus	8	12
3	Ørnene Silkeborg	8	11
4	Lyngdrengene Herning	8	9
5	Cometerne Fjelsted	8	9

Division 3 Group 4

Pos	Team	P	Pts
1	Leoparderne Fjelsted	8	21
2	Geopards Vojens	8	20
3	Brodrenene Fredericia	8	11
4	Girafdrengene Odense	8	4
5	Knaegtene Esbjerg	8	4

Division 3 Group 5

Pos	Team	P	Pts
1	Hanerne Hanherred	8	24
2	Makrellerne Aabenraa	8	15
3	Drabanterne Frederiksborg	8	12
4	Klørerne Esbjerg	8	8
5	Hunters Vojens	8	1
