= 1977 Danish speedway season =

Season of speedway in Denmark

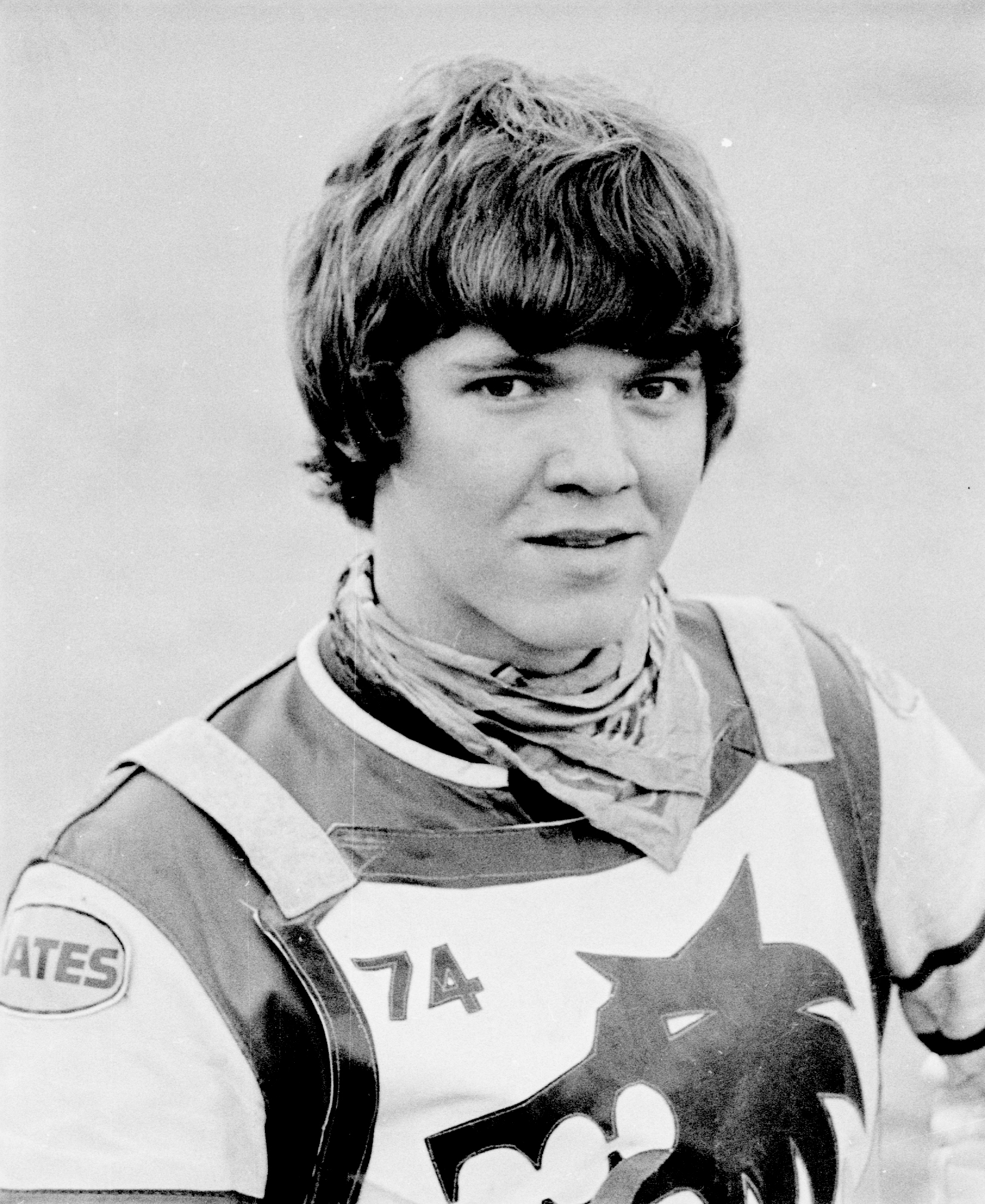
- Finn Thomsen won the Danish round of the World Championship.

The 1977 Danish speedway season was the 1977 season of motorcycle speedway in Denmark.

== Individual ==
=== Danish Final (world championship round) ===
Five riders from the Danish final would progress to the Nordic Final as part of the 1977 Individual Speedway World Championship. The final was held on 19 May at Fredericia, and was won by Finn Thomsen. Only 5 riders qualified for the Nordic final because Ole Olsen was already seeded through to the Nordic final.

Final

Pos.	Rider	Club	Total
1	Finn Thomsen	Arhus	13
2	Erling Rasmussen	Fredericia	12+3
3	Bo Petersen	Fjelsted	12+2
4	Gunnar Svendsen	Holsted	11
5	Finn Rune Jensen	Vojens	9+3
6	Bent Nørregaard-Jensen	Esbjerg	9+2
7	Bent Rasmussen	Herning	8
8	Frank Mastrup	Glumsø	8
9	Kaj Kristiansen	Esjberg	7
10	Knud Ellegaard	Esjberg	7
11	Jens Erik Krause Kjaer	Arhus	7
12	Kurt Bøgh	Holsted	6
13	Frank Hansen	Haderslev	5
14	Jorgen Walther Johansen	Frederiksborg	5
15	Otto Larsen		1
16	Preben Rosenkilde	Arhus	0

=== Individual Championship ===
The 1977 Danish Individual Speedway Championship was the 1977 edition of the Danish Individual Speedway Championship. The final was held at Fredericia on 31 July. The title was won by Ole Olsen for the 10th time.

Final

Pos.	Rider	Club	Total
1	Ole Olsen	Vojens	14
2	Finn Thomsen	Arhus	13
3	Hans Nielsen	Brovst	12
4	Alf Busk	Silkeborg	11
5	Finn Rune Jensen	Vojens	11
6	Bo Petersen	Fjelsted	11
7	Bent Rasmussen	Herning	10
8	Kristian Præstbro	Esbjerg	8
9	Frank Mastrup	Glumsø	7
10	Knud Ellegaard	Esbjerg	6
11	Erling Rasmussen	Fredericia	5
12	Gunnar Svendsen	Holsted	3
13	Bent Nørregaard-Jensen	Esjberg	3
14	Kurt Bøgh	Holsted	3
15	Jens Erik Krause Kjaer	Arhus	2
16	Ernst Bøgh	Holsted	0

Key - Each heat has four riders, 3 points for a heat win, 2 for 2nd, 1 for third and 0 for last

=== Junior Championship ===
Erik Gundersen won the Junior Championship.

== Team ==
=== Danish Tournament ===
The 1977 Danish Tournament was won by Holsted Tigers, who became Danish champions for the second successive year.

Division 1 league table

Pos	Team	P	Pts
1	Holsted Tigers	8	20 +291
2	Vikingerne Esbjerg	8	20 +271
3	Piraterne Århus	8	11
4	Uldjyderne Herning	8	5
5	Faestningsdrengene Fredericia	8	4

Division 2 Group 1

Pos	Team	P	Pts
1	Ulvene Midtsjaellands	8	23
2	Klitrengene Esbjerg	8	15
3	Holsted Panthers	8	14
4	Fynborne Odin Odense	8	5
5	Cimbrerne Aalborg	8	3

Division 2 Group 2

Pos	Team	P	Pts
1	Kulsvierne Frederiksborg	8	23
2	Løverne Haderslev	8	14
3	Falkene Silkeborg	8	13
4	Skansedrengene Fredericia	8	8
5	Hanerne Hanherred	8	2

Division 3 Group 1

Pos	Team	P	Pts
1	Blabjergdrengene Outrup	8	20
2	Ulveungerne Midtsjaellands	8	16
3	Fighters Vojens	8	15
4	Ørnene Silkeborg	8	6
5	Fangeldrengene Odin Odense	8	3

Division 3 Group 2

Pos	Team	P	Pts
1	Geopards Vojens	8	24
2	Jokerne Esbjerg	8	13
3	Urhanerne Herning	8	12
4	Drabanterne Frederiksborg	8	11
5	Girafdrengene Odense	8	0

Division 3 Group 3

Pos	Team	P	Pts
1	Pythonerne Århus	8	18
2	Hvepsene Haderslev	8	15
3	Raketterne Fjelsted	8	13
4	Skovtroldene Frederiksborg	8	12
5	Laksene Randers	8	0

Division 3 Group 4

Pos	Team	P	Pts
1	Brodrenene Fredericia	8	19
2	Praerieulvene Midtsjaellands	8	15
3	Cometerne Fjelsted	8	15
4	Antiloperne Haderslev	8	7
5	Lyngdrengene Herning	8	4

Division 3 Group 5

Pos	Team	P	Pts
1	Leoparderne Fjelsted	8	24
2	Volddrengene Fredericia	8	15
3	Makrellerne Aabenraa	8	12
4	Rodspaetterne Frederikshavn	8	5
5	Smedene Aalborg	8	4
