= 1996 Danish speedway season =

Season of speedway in Denmark

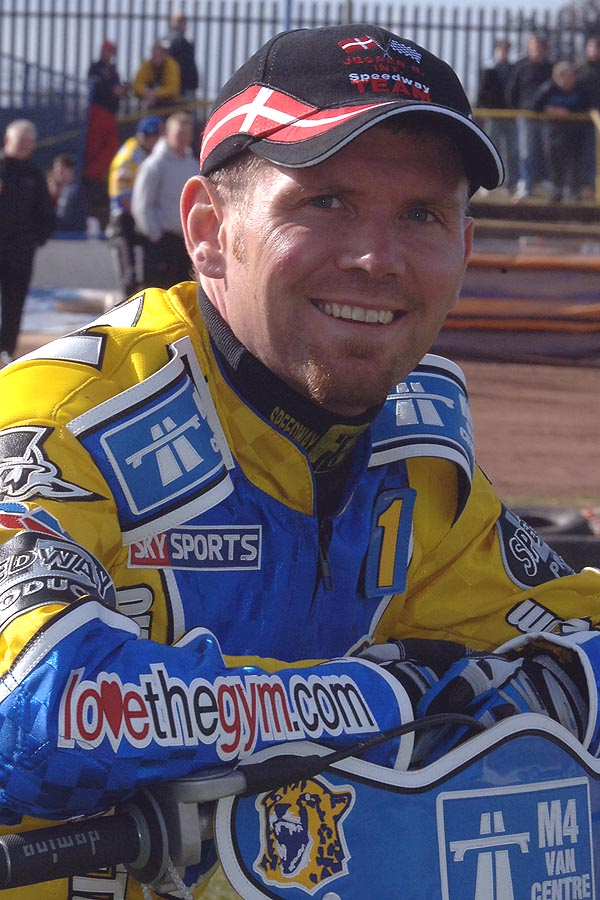
- Jesper B. Jensen was part of the Holsted team that won the league title.

The 1996 Danish speedway season was the 1996 season of motorcycle speedway in Denmark.

== Individual ==
=== Individual Championship ===
The 1996 Danish Individual Speedway Championship was the 1996 edition of the Danish Individual Speedway Championship. The final was held over 2 rounds at Holstebro on 25 May and at Fjelsted on 26 May. The title was won by Brian Karger.

The Championship formed part of the 1997 Speedway Grand Prix Qualification with 5 riders qualifying for the Scandinavian Final.

Final

Pos.	Rider	Team	Scores	Total
1	Brian Karger	Holsted	11,15	26
2	Jan Stæchmann	Vojens	11,13	24
3	Brian Andersen	Slangerup	11,11	22
4	John Jørgensen	Fjelsted	13,8	21
5	Ronni Pedersen	Fjelsted	12,9	21
6	Gert Handberg	Fredericia	10,9	19
7	Frede Schött	Outrup	12,7	19
8	Jesper Olsen	Slangerup		15
9	Hans Clausen	Vojens		14
10	Aksel Jepsen	Outrup		13
11	Martin Vinther	Fredericia		11
12	Klaus Rasmussen	Vojens		9
13	Jesper B. Jensen	Holsted		9
14	Ole Hansen (res)			6
15	Bo Skov Eriksen	Herning		5
16	Jan Andersen	Slangerup		3
17	Anders Nielsen (res)	Slangerup		2
18	Allan Nielsen			1

Key - Each heat has four riders, 3 points for a heat win, 2 for 2nd, 1 for third and 0 for last

=== Junior Championship ===
Hans Andersen won the Junior Championship.

== Team ==
=== Danish Superliga ===
The 1996 season was won by Holsted for the 7th time.

Pos	Team	P	Pts
1	Holsted	14	33
2	Fredericia	14	28
3	Holstebro	14	26
4	Outrup	14	20
5	Slangerup	14	19
6	Herning	14	15
7	Fjelsted	14	14
8	Vojens	14	13
