= 1991 Danish speedway season =

Season of speedway in Denmark

The 1991 Danish speedway season was the 1991 season of motorcycle speedway in Denmark. It was the last time that two separate Danish finals would be held. As from 1992, a single final would also become the qualification race for the World Championship.

== Individual ==
=== Danish Final (world championship round) ===
Six riders from the Danish final would progress to the Nordic Final as part of the 1991 Individual Speedway World Championship. The final was held at the Fladbro Motorbane on 19 May. Jan O. Pedersen won the event.

Pos.	Rider	Team	Total
1	Jan O. Pedersen	Fjelsted	15
2	Tommy Knudsen	Fredericia	14
3	Hans Nielsen	Brovst	12+3
4	John Jörgensen	Fjelsted	12+2
5	Gert Handberg	Holsted	10
6	Bo Petersen	Saeby	9
7	Jan Jacobsen		8
8	Brian Karger	Fredericia	6
9	Jan Staechmann	Slangerup	6
10	Jens-Henry Nielsen	Brovst	6
11	Allan Johansen	Holsted	6
12	Tom P. Knudsen	Holstebro	5
13	Per Sörensen	Slangerup	4
14	Jan Pedersen		3
15	Lars Munkedal	Slangerup	3
16	Lars-Henrik Jörgensen	Fjelsted	1

=== Individual Championship ===
The 1991 Danish Individual Speedway Championship was the 1991 edition of the Danish Individual Speedway Championship. The final was held at Frederikslyst on 4 August. The title was won by Jan O. Pedersen for the second time.

Final

Pos.	Rider	Team	Scores	Total
1	Jan O. Pedersen	Fjelsted	3,3,2,3,3	14
2	Gert Handberg	Holsted	3,3,2,3,2	13
3	Peter Ravn	Randers	3,2,3,2,2	12
4	Tommy Knudsen	Fredericia	2,0,3,3,3	11
5	Jens Henry Nielsen	Brovst	1,2,1,3,2	9
6	Brian Andersen	Fredericia	3,2,0,0,3	8
7	Hans Nielsen	Brovst	2,3,3,0,0	8
8	Tom P. Knudsen	Holstebro	1,0,2,2,3	8
9	Brian Karger	Fredericia	0,3,2,1,0	6
10	Ole Hansen	Fredericia	2,1,1,0,2	6
11	John Jørgensen	Fjelsted	2,1,0,2,1	6
12	Allan Johansen	Holsted	0,0,3,1,1	5
13	Bo Petersen	Saeby	1,2,1,0	4
14	Bo Sørensen	Slangerup	1,1,0,1,1	4
15	Jens Peter Nielsen	Randers	0,1,1,0,1	3
16	Lars Henrik Jørgensen	Fjelsted	0,0,0,0,0	0

Key - Each heat has four riders, 3 points for a heat win, 2 for 2nd, 1 for third and 0 for last

=== Junior Championship ===
Kim Brandt won the Junior Championship.

== Team ==
=== Danish Superliga ===
The 1991 Superliga season was won by Holsted for the 5th time. Randers joined the Super League for the first time.

League table

Pos	Team	P	Pts
1	Holsted	14	34
2	Fredericia	14	26
3	Holstebro	14	25
4	Slangerup	14	21
5	Fjelsted	14	19
6	Randers	14	17
7	Brovst	14	15
8	Saeby	14	11
