= Morten Risager =

Danish speedway rider

- Born: 30 September 1987 (age 39); Aarhus, Denmark
- Nationality: Danish

Career history

Denmark
- 2003, 2008–2009: Slangerup
- 2006: Brovst
- 2004–2005: Fredericia
- 2010–2012: Holsted
- 2013–2014: Munkebo
- 2015: Grindsted
- 2016: Fjelsted
- 2017: Region Varde

Great Britain
- 2004–2007: Coventry Bees
- –2007: Eastbourne Eagles
- 2008–: Wolverhampton Wolves
- 2008: Peterborough Panthers
- 2009, 2011–2014, 2016: Ipswich Witches
- 2009, 2011: Belle Vue Aces
- 2009–2010: Swindon Robins
- 2015: Plymouth Devils

Poland
- 2006–2007: Ostrów
- 2008: Grudziądz
- 2009: Gniezno
- 2010: Łódź

Sweden
- 2003: Team Bikab

Team honours
- 2011: Premier League Fours Champion

Morten Risager (born 30 September 1987 in Denmark) is a former motorcycle speedway rider from Denmark. He earned one cap for the Denmark national speedway team.

== Career ==
Risager earned his speedway licence in 2003. He first appeared in the British leagues during the 2004 season, riding for Coventry Bees.

Risager first rode for Ipswich Witches in 2009 and 2011, which included being part of the Ipswich team that won the Premier League Four-Team Championship, held on 23 October 2011, at Beaumont Park Stadium. He also spent two seasons with Swindon Robins.

Risager announced his retirement in January 2018.

== Results ==
=== Speedway Grand Prix ===
2007 Speedway Grand Prix Final Championship standings (Riding No 18)
Race no.	Grand Prix	Pos.	Pts.	Heats	Draw No
4 /11	(Denmark) Danish SGP	16	2	(0,2)	18

permanent speedway rider
wild card, track reserve or qualified reserve
rider not classified (track reserve who did not start)

=== Honours ===
- Individual U-21 World Championship:
  - 2005 – track reserve
  - 2007 – 8 place (8 points)
- Team U-21 World Championship:
  - 2005 – Bronze medal (10 points)
  - 2006 – Bronze medal (4 points)
  - 2007 – 5 place – 2nd in Semi-Final B (9 points)
  - 2008 – Silver medal (4 points)
- Individual U-19 European Championship:
  - 2004 – Bronze medal
  - 2006 – injury before Final
- Individual Danish Championship:
  - 2004 – 10 place
  - 2005 – 6 place
- Individual U-21 Danish Championship:
  - 2003 – 9 place
  - 2004 – Bronze medal
  - 2005 – Silver medal
  - 2006 – Silver medal

== See also ==
- Denmark speedway team
