= Tom P. Knudsen =

Danish speedway rider

- Born: 14 September 1968 (age 58); Gørding, Denmark
- Nationality: Danish

Career history

Denmark
- 1988–1993: Holstebro
- 1999: Outrup

Great Britain
- 1989, 1993: Swindon Robins
- 1990–1992: Poole Pirates

Team honours
- 1990: National League
- 1990: Knockout Cup
- 1999: Danish Speedway League

Tom P. Knudsen (born 14 September 1968) is a former motorcycle speedway rider from Denmark.

== Career ==
Knudsen started racing in the British leagues during the 1989 British League season, when riding a couple of times for the Swindon Robins. However, it was riding for Poole Pirates during the 1990 National League season that Knudsen experienced success as part of the league and cup double winning team.

Knudsen later won the Danish Speedway League with Outrup in 1999.
