= Claus Vissing =

Danish speedway rider

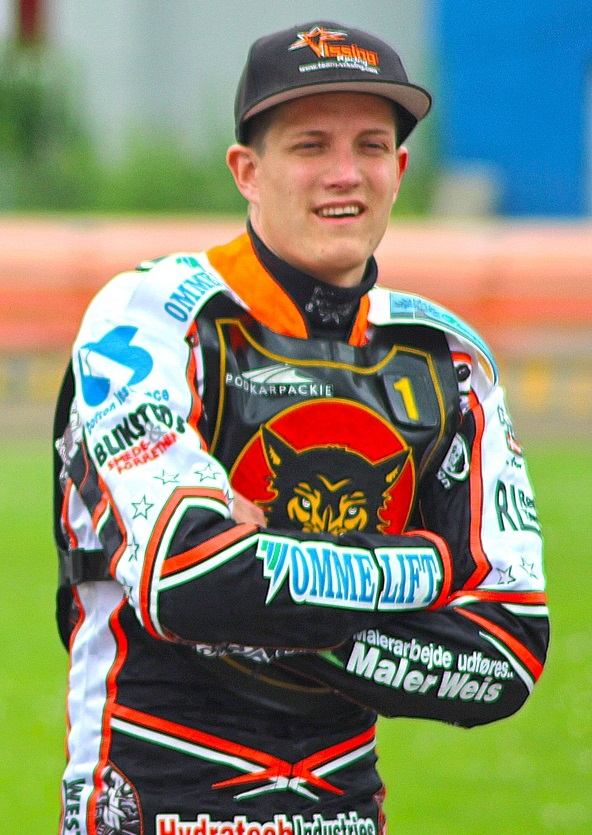
- Born: 6 June 1986 (age 40); Grindsted, Denmark
- Nationality: Danish

Career history

Denmark
- 2004–2007, 2023: Holsted
- 2008–2010, 2012, 2014: Fjelsted
- 2011, 2017–2018: Grindsted
- 2013, 2016: Outrup/Varde
- 2021: Nordjysk
- 2022: Esbjerg

Great Britain
- 2007, 2010: Stoke
- 2007–2009: Peterborough
- 2010: Ipswich
- 2011, 2013, 2022: Birmingham
- 2012, 2018: Somerset
- 2013: Edinburgh
- 2014–2015, 2017: Berwick
- 2016, 2024: Workington
- 2018–2019, 2023: Glasgow
- 2019: Swindon
- 2023: Sheffield

Poland
- 2006: Miskolc
- 2008: Gniezno
- 2010: Łódź
- 2011: Rawicz
- 2013–2016: Krosno
- 2017–2018: Kraków

Team honours
- 2019, 2023: League winners
- 2019: Knockout Cup
- 2013: Premier League Fours winner
- 2023: SGB Championship winner

Claus Korsbang Vissing (born 6 June 1986) is a Danish speedway rider.

== Career ==
Vissing made his British league debut for Stoke Potters in the 2007 Premier League speedway season before joining Peterborough Panthers for the 2008 and 2009 seasons. In 2010, he rode in the top tier of British Speedway, riding for Ipswich Witches during the 2010 Elite League speedway season. The following season in 2011, he signed for Birmingham Brummies but soon moved on to Somerset Rebels for 2012. He then spent three years in Scotland with Edinburgh Monarchs and Berwick Bandits respectively.

Vissing was part of the Edinburgh Monarchs team that won the Premier League Four-Team Championship, which was held on 14 July 2013, at the East of England Arena.

In 2016, Vissing joined Workington Comets and then rode again for Berwick in 2017. He was a member of the Swindon Robins team in the SGB Premiership 2019 that won the league and Knockout cup double. He also had two solid seasons in the Championship, helping Glasgow Tigers to two second place finishes in 2018 and 2019.

After a COVID-19 pandemic cancelled 2020 season, Vissing was released by Newcastle Diamonds for the SGB Championship 2021 because of travel restrictions.

In 2022, Vissing re-joined and rode for the Birmingham Brummies in the SGB Championship 2022. In 2023, he returned to Glasgow for the SGB Championship 2023, where he won the league title. He tasted more success when during the latter part of the season he signed for Sheffield Tigers and helped them win the league title.

Vissing joined Workington Comets for the 2024 season.
