= Jan Graversen =

Danish speedway rider

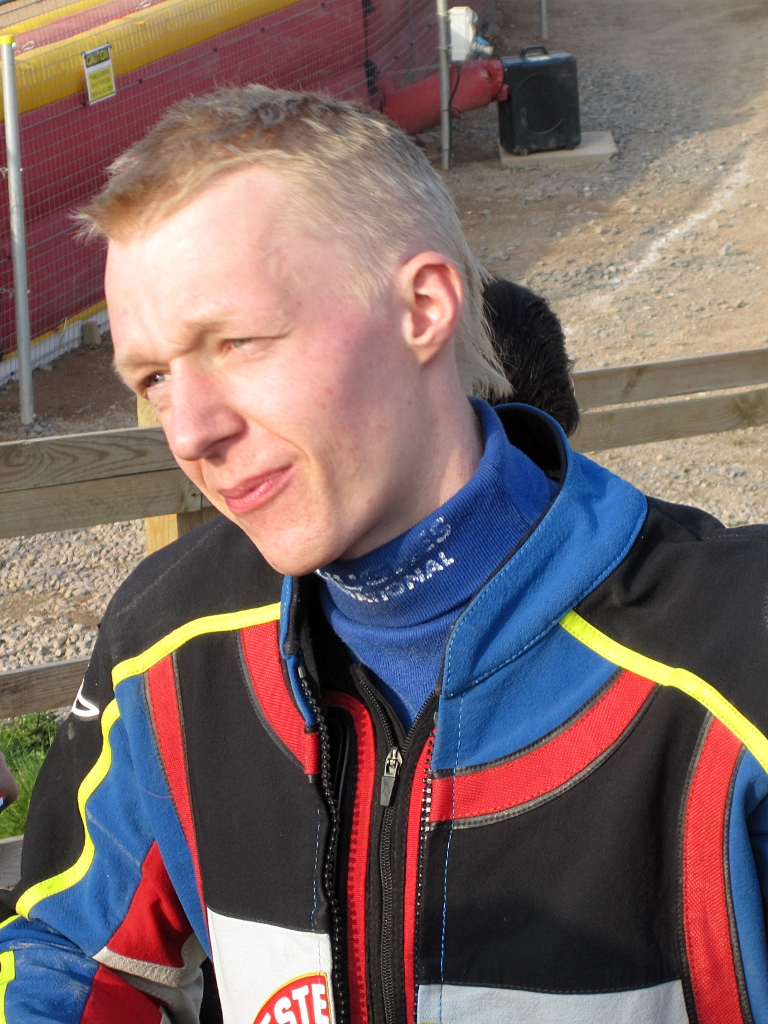
- Born: 10 April 1987 (age 39); Sallingsund, Denmark
- Nationality: Danish

Career history

Denmark
- 2004: Glumso
- 2006: Brovst
- 2005, 2012, 2017–2018: Slangerup
- 2007, 2011: Holstebro

Great Britain
- 2008: Mildenhall Fen Tigers
- 2009: King's Lynn Stars
- 2010, 2014–2016: Redcar Bears
- 2010: Stoke Potters
- 2010: Scunthorpe Scorpions
- 2011–2013: Leicester Lions
- 2017: Somerset Rebels
- 2017–2018: Sheffield Tigers

Jan Graversen (born 10 April 1987) is a Danish former motorcycle speedway rider who rode in the British Premier League for Leicester Lions and in the SGB Premiership for Somerset Rebels.

== Career ==
Born in Sallingsund, Graversen rode in Britain for Mildenhall Fen Tigers in the 2008 season after first riding at the track in 2007, ending the year as the club's top scorer. In 2009, he rode for King's Lynn Stars, the team winning the Premier League, Premier Trophy and Knock-out Cup that year.

In 2010, with his CMA too high for King's Lynn to give him a place, Graversen was loaned out to Redcar Bears, Stoke Potters, and Scunthorpe Scorpions, and won the Kenny Smith Memorial Trophy at Scunthorpe that year. He signed for Leicester Lions for 2011, finishing the season as the team's highest scorer and only ever-present rider. He has raced in Denmark for Slangerup.
