= Martin Vinther =

Danish speedway rider

- Born: 24 August 1972 (age 54); Holstebro, Denmark
- Nationality: Danish

Career history

Denmark
- 2000–2007: Brovst

Great Britain
- 1995–1996: Middlesbrough Bears

Martin Vinther (born 24 August 1972) is a Danish former motorcycle speedway rider. He earned one cap for the Denmark national speedway team.

== Career ==
Vinther started racing in the top tier of the British leagues during the 1995 Premier League speedway season, when riding for the Middlesbrough Bears.
