= Ulrich Østergaard =

Danish speedway rider (born 1981)

- Born: 19 April 1981 (age 45); Odense, Denmark
- Nickname: Ulle
- Nationality: Danish

Career history

Denmark
- 2000–2002, 2008–2009, 2022: Brovst/Nordjsyk
- 2004–2005: Fredericia
- 2003, 2006–2007, 2010: Holsted
- 2011–2013: Grindsted
- 2014–2015, 2021: Fjelsted
- 2016: Munkebo
- 2007, 2017–2018: Holstebro
- 2019: Esbjerg

Great Britain
- 2003–2005: Eastbourne Eagles
- 2004–2005: Isle of Wight Islanders
- 2005: Swindon Robins
- 2006–2007, 2010, 2014–2022: Peterborough Panthers
- 2007, 2011, 2019: Birmingham Brummies
- 2007: Workington Comets
- 2008: Reading Racers
- 2009–2010, 2012–2013: Belle Vue Aces
- 2012–2013, 2019: Redcar Bears
- 2019: Newcastle Diamonds
- 2020–2022: Glasgow Tigers

Sweden
- 2003: Team Bikab

Team honours
- 2006, 2019: Elite League Champion
- 2017, 2018: SGB Championship Fours Winner
- 2017: SGB Championship KO Cup Winner

Ulrich Reinhold Østergaard (born 19 April 1981 in Odense, Denmark) is a Danish former motorcycle speedway rider.

== Career ==
Østergaard initially came to the United Kingdom for a trial with the Trelawny Tigers in 2002 and impressed the management as they offered a contract immediately. However the British Speedway Promoters' Association did not ratify the deal due to the complex points limit in operation that season. Østergaard was eventually signed by the Eastbourne Eagles to ride in the ill-fated British League Cup during 2003. The 2004 season saw Østergaard gain his first full-time UK ride with the Isle of Wight Islanders, where he stayed for two seasons, doubling up with the Eastbourne Eagles in the Elite League. In 2006, he was signed by the Peterborough Panthers, winning the Elite League title. 2007 saw Østergaard step down a division to ride for the Birmingham Brummies, but after falling out with the management he signed for the Workington Comets.

Østergaard signed for the Reading Racers in 2008 for the start of their new season back in the Premier League after a two-year stint in the Elite League. He started the season with an average of 8.27, filling the number three spot on the Racers line up. By the end of the season, he had topped Reading's averages with a 10.33 figure. He was also named 2008 Premier League Rider of the Year by the Speedway Riders Association.

In 2014, Østergaard returned to Peterborough and would remain with them for nine seasons. He was part of the Peterborough team that won the SGB Championship Fours, which was held on 6 August 2017, at the East of England Arena. He repeated the success the following season, helping Peterborough win the fours again, this time it was held on 1 July 2018, at the Media Prime Arena.

Having started the 2019 season as Birmingham Brummies number 1 rider, Østergaard was dropped by the Midlands team and quickly re-signed for former team Redcar Bears.

As of 2021, Østergaard rode in the top tier of British Speedway, riding for the Peterborough Panthers in the SGB Premiership 2021, in addition to the Glasgow Tigers in the SGB Championship 2021. He was involved in a serious crash in July 2021 breaking bones in his back and wrist.

In 2022, Østergaard rode for the Peterborough in the SGB Premiership 2022 and for the Glasgow in the SGB Championship 2022.

In November 2022, Østergaard announced his retirement from competitive racing and an intention to manage a team in Denmark.
