= Henrik Møller (speedway rider) =

Danish speedway rider

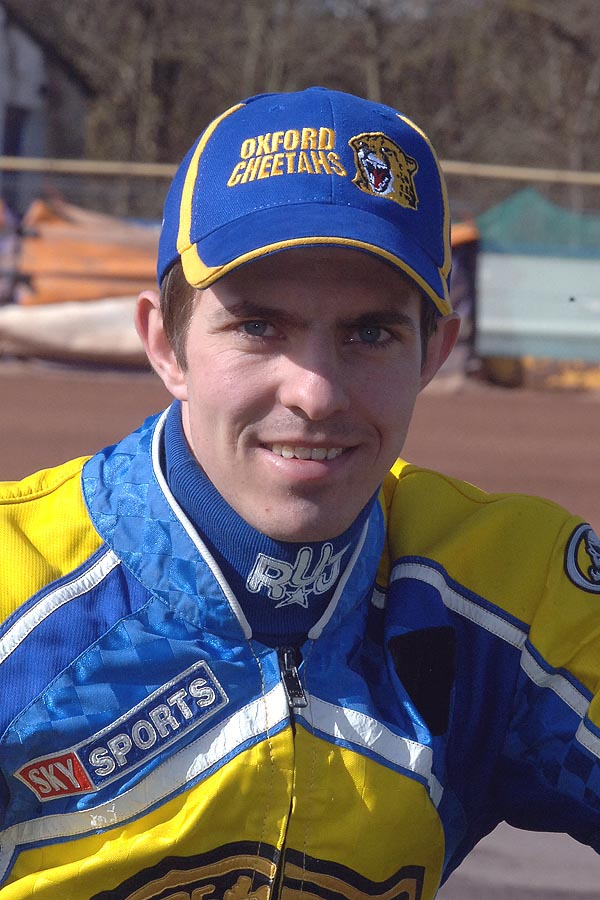
- Henrik Møller in 2007
- Born: 3 September 1985 (age 41); Fredericia, Denmark
- Nationality: Danish

Career history

Denmark
- 2002–2009, 2011, 2014: Holsted
- 2008, 2010: Holstebro
- 2012–2013: Fjelsted

Poland
- 2006: Ostrów
- 2008: Rybnik

Great Britain
- 2006-2007: Edinburgh Monarchs
- 2007: Birmingham Brummies
- 2007: Oxford Cheetahs
- 2008: Peterborough Panthers

Team honours
- 2005, 2006 (bronze): U-21 World Cup

Henrik Møller (born 3 September 1985 in Fredericia) is a former motorcycle speedway rider from Denmark and speedway manager.

== Career ==
Møller was a member of Denmark team that won the bronze medal at both the 2005 Team Speedway Junior World Championship and 2006 Team Speedway Junior World Championship.

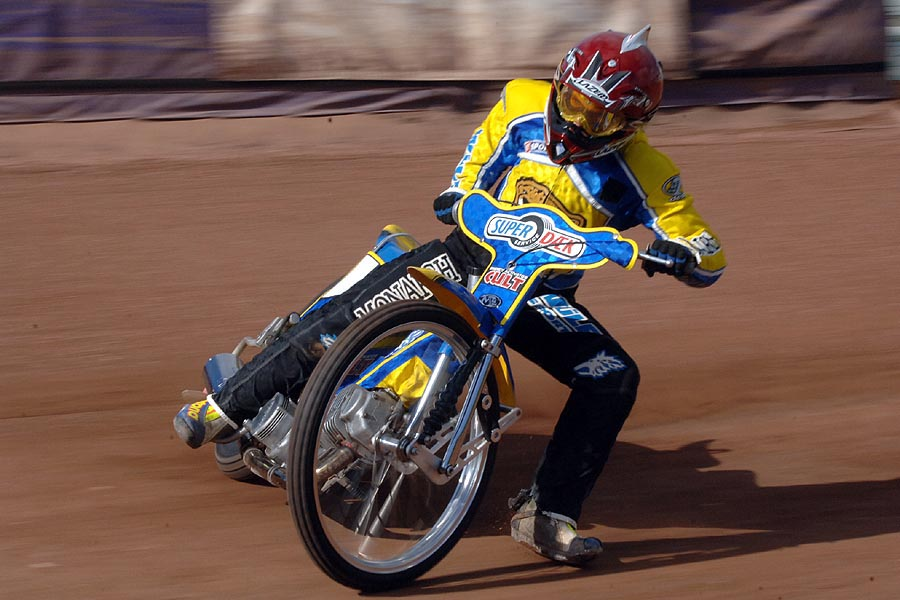
Moller riding for Oxford

In 2006, Møller signed for the Edinburgh Monarchs for the 2006 Premier League speedway season achieving a 6.57 average. He signed for Oxford Cheetahs in the 2007 Elite League speedway season, but following Oxford's withdrawal from the league, he rode for Birmingham and Edinburgh.

Møller's final season in Great Britain was riding for Peterborough Panthers for the 2008 Elite League speedway season.

Møller rode the majority of his speedway in his native country of Denmark for the Holsted Tigers, where he won six championships in the Danish Speedway League. On his return to the club in 2014 he won yet another league title with them.

In 2019, Møller became the assistant coach of the Danish national team, where he teamed up with Hans Nielsen).

== Career details ==
=== World Championships ===
- Individual U-21 World Championship (Under-21 World Championship)
  - 2006 - (Italy) Terenzano - 10th place (6 pts)
- Team U-21 World Championship (Under-21 Speedway World Cup)
  - 2005 - (Czech Republic) Pardubice - 3rd place (7 pts)
  - 2006 - (Poland) Rybnik - 3rd place (7 pts)

=== European Championships ===
- Individual European Championship
  - 2005 - (Italy) Lonigo - 14th place (3 pts)
  - 2007 - (Austria) Wiener Neustadt - 17th place (0 pts)
- Individual U-19 European Championship
  - 2004 - (Poland) Rybnik - 6th place (8 pts)

== See also ==
- Denmark national speedway team
