= Ernst Bøgh =

Danish speedway rider (1955–2024)

- Born: 13 January 1955; Fredericia, Denmark
- Died: 27 October 2024 (aged 69); Denmark
- Nationality: Danish

Career history

Denmark
- 19??: Holsted

Great Britain
- 1976: Leicester Lions
- 1976: Sheffield Tigers

Ernst Bøgh (13 January 1955 – 27 October 2024) was a Danish motorcycle speedway rider.

== Speedway career ==
Born in Fredericia, Bøgh, together with his older brother Kurt, was instrumental in helping to form the Holsted Speedway Klub in 1974. The pair rode for the club in the Danish Speedway League.

Bøgh rode successfully in several countries before signing to ride for Leicester Lions in the British League in 1976, becoming the first Dane to ride for the Lions. After struggling to be competitive he was released after riding in eleven matches. He subsequently signed for Sheffield Tigers, but his tenure there was even shorter.

Bøgh later prepared the track at the Moldow Speedway Arena and in 2018 opened a speedway museum.

== Family ==
Bøgh's brother Kurt was also an international speedway rider.
