= Kristian Præstbro =

Danish speedway rider

- Born: 11 December 1954 (age 71); Esbjerg, Denmark
- Died: May 2003
- Nationality: Danish

Career history
- 1976-1977: Belle Vue Aces
- 1978-1979: Cradley Heathens

Team honours
- 1978: Speedway World Team Cup gold medal
- 1979: British League KO Cup Winner
- 1976, 1977: Northern Trophy

Kristian Præstbro (born 11 December 1954 - May 2003) was an international speedway rider from Denmark. He earned six caps for the Denmark national speedway team.

== Speedway career ==
Præstbro won a gold medal at the Speedway World Team Cup in the 1978 Speedway World Team Cup. Although unused, he received the medal as one of the five riders named in the team and was at the event ready to ride as a replacement in any heat called upon.

Præstbro rode in the top tier of British Speedway riding for Belle Vue Aces from 1976 to 1977 and Cradley Heath Heathens from 1978 to 1979.

Præstbro died May 2003 from a brain tumor.

== World final appearances ==
=== World Team Cup ===
- 1978 - (West Germany) Landshut, Stadion Ellermühle (with Ole Olsen / Hans Nielsen / Finn Thomsen / Mike Lohmann) - Winner - 37pts (stood as reserve)

=== World Longtrack Championship ===
- 1975 – (Socialist Federal Republic of Yugoslavia) Gornja Radgona 17th 1pt
- 1977 – (Denmark) Aalborg 7th 12pts
- 1978 – (Germany) Mühldorf 12th 9pts
- 1979 – (Czech Republic) Mariánské Lázně 8th 11pts
