= Frede Schött =

Danish speedway rider

- Born: 28 December 1970 (age 55); Kolding, Denmark
- Nationality: Danish

Career history

Denmark
- 1989, 2004: Fredericia
- 1998: Holsted
- 2000–2003: Outrup

Great Britain
- 1990–1991, 2002–2004: Edinburgh Monarchs
- 1992–1996: Belle Vue Aces

Sweden
- 2000: Vetlanda

Individual honours
- 1989, 1991: World Under-21 finalist

Team honours
- 1993: British League winners

Frede Schött (born 28 December 1970) is a former speedway rider from Denmark.

== Speedway career ==
Schött was a World Under-21 finalist in 1989 and 1991.

Schött first rode in the British leagues riding for Edinburgh Monarchs in 1990. He then rode in the top tier of British Speedway from 1992 to 1996, riding for Belle Vue Aces. He was an integral part of the Belle Vue Aces team that won the league during the 1993 British League season.

Schött later rode for Edinburgh Monarchs again from 2002 to 2004.
