= Henning Bager =

Danish motorcycle speedway rider

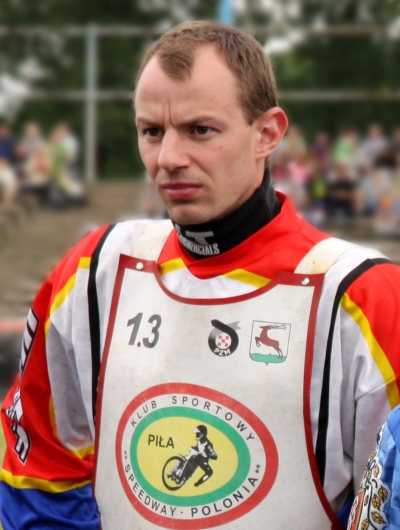
- Born: 18 February 1981 (age 45); Esbjerg, Denmark
- Nationality: Danish

Career history

Denmark
- 2000–2003: Holsted
- 2004–2005: Outrup
- 2007, 2009, 2011, 2014: Grindsted
- 2010: Holstebro
- 2012: Slangerup
- 2013, 2016: Munkebo
- 2015: Fjelsted

Great Britain
- 2001, 2012–2013: Glasgow
- 2002, 2004–2005, 2008, 2009: Peterborough
- 2002: Isle of Wight
- 2003, 2006–2007: Arena Essex/Lakeside
- 2007: Birmingham
- 2008, 2012, 2016: Berwick
- 2009: Belle Vue
- 2010: Redcar
- 2010: Stoke
- 2011: Leicester
- 2012: Coventry Bees

Poland
- 2005: Opole
- 2006-2008: Łódź
- 2009: Piła

Henning Bager (born 18 February 1981) is a former motorcycle speedway rider from Denmark.

== Biography ==
Bager was born in Esbjerg. Bager has competed in the UK since 1991, when he made his debut with Glasgow Tigers. He has since been part of several teams including Elite League Peterborough Panthers, Lakeside Hammers and Belle Vue Aces. In 2009, he broke his left leg in three places while riding for Panthers. He was fit again to ride in 2010 and appeared in seven meetings for Redcar Bears before being released after a poor run of form. He had a brief spell with Stoke Potters shortly afterwards. In August 2010, Bager was banned for the remainder of the season by the Danish authorities after being involved in a fight during a Danish league match.

Bager returned to British racing in June 2011 when he was signed by Leicester Lions to replace Richard Sweetman, continuing to ride for the Lions for the rest of the season. In December 2011, he signed to ride for Coventry Bees in the 2012 Elite League season. Henning rode for Berwick Bandits in the Premier League before retiring.
