= Mike Lohmann =

Danish speedway rider

- Born: 6 June 1954 (age 72); Hillerød, Denmark
- Nationality: Danish

Career history
- 1976-1979: Halifax Dukes
- 1980, 1981: Belle Vue Aces

Team honours
- 1978: Speedway World Team Cup gold medal
- 1979: Speedway World Team Cup silver medal

Mikael Lohmann Jorgensen (born 6 June 1954) is a former international speedway rider from Denmark.

== Speedway career ==
Lohmann won a gold medal at the Speedway World Team Cup in the 1978 Speedway World Team Cup. The following year, he won a silver medal at the 1979 Speedway World Team Cup.

Lohmann rode in the top tier of British Speedway from 1976 to 1981, riding for Halifax Dukes and Belle Vue Aces. He was also the 1974 Danish Junior Champion. he broke his collar bone during the 1977 season.

== Family ==
Lohmann's brother Klaus was also a speedway rider.

== World final appearances ==
=== World Team Cup ===
- 1978 - (West Germany) Landshut, Stadion Ellermühle (with Ole Olsen / Hans Nielsen / Finn Thomsen) - Winner - 37pts (9)
- 1979 - (England) London, White City Stadium (with Ole Olsen / Hans Nielsen / Finn Thomsen / Bo Petersen) - 2nd - 31pts (6)
