= Patrick Hougaard =

Danish speedway rider (born 1989)

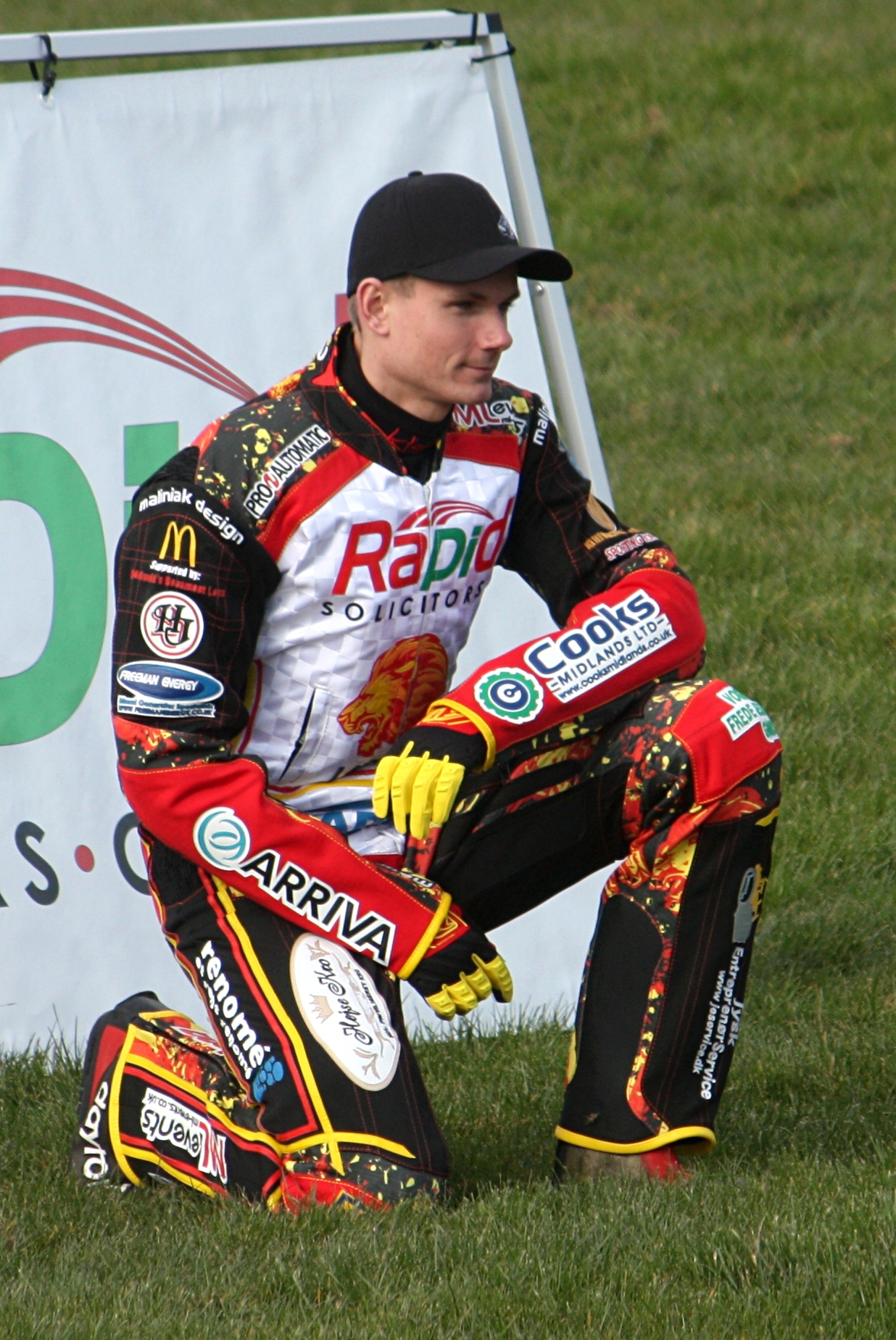
- Born: 23 May 1989 (age 37); Fredericia, Denmark
- Nationality: Danish

Career history

Denmark
- 2004–2009, 2011–2014: Holsted
- 2005–2006: Fredericia
- 2010: Vojens
- 2015–2017: Fjelsted
- 2018: Grindsted

Poland
- 2006-2007: Leszno
- 2008-2010, 2013: Tarnów
- 2011: Grudziądz
- 2014-2015: Bydgoszcz
- 2016-2017: Kraków
- 2018: Gdańsk

Sweden
- 2015: Vargarna

Great Britain
- 2007: Reading
- 2008-2012: Belle Vue
- 2013: Peterborough
- 2014, 2016: Leicester
- 2017: Somerset

Individual honours
- 2007 - 3rd place: European Championship
- 2006: U-19 Nordic Champion
- 2007, 2009: Danish Under-21 champion

Team honours
- 2010: U-21 World Cup
- 2008 - 3rd place: Team U-19 European Championship
- 2007: Team Polish Champion
- 2004-2007, 2014: Danish League

Patrick Hald Hougaard (born 23 May 1989) is a former motorcycle speedway rider from Denmark, who was a member of Denmark U-21 national team.

== Career ==
Patrick Hougaard was born in Fredericia to parents Søren and Dorthe. He has two brothers Casper and Nicklas.

Hougaard won the Danish Under-21 championship in 2007, and first raced in the UK towards the end of the 2007 season, for Reading Racers. He signed for the Belle Vue Aces midway through the 2008 season on leaving school. He again won the Danish Under-21 title in 2009 and was part of the Danish team that won the under-21 team cup in 2010. He stayed with Belle Vue until the end of the 2012 season, joining Peterborough Panthers in 2013.

In December 2013, Hougaard signed to ride for Leicester Lions in their debut Elite League season in 2014. He also signed to ride in Poland for Polonia Bydgoszcz.

In 2023, Hougaard was the team manager of Slangerup.

== Speedway Grand Prix results ==
2008 SGP
	Grand Prix	Pos.	Pts.	Heats	Draw
—	(Denmark) Copenhagen	18	-	-	18

2009 SGP
	Grand Prix	Pos.	Pts.	Heats	Draw
—	(Denmark) Copenhagen				17

permanent speedway rider
wild card, track reserve or qualified reserve
rider not classified (track reserve who did not start)

== World Championships ==
- Individual U-21 World Championship (Under-21 World Championship)
  - 2007 - 10th place in Semi-final 2
  - 2008 - (Czech Republic) Pardubice - 8th place (8 pts)
  - 2009 - (Croatia) Goričan - 3rd place (12+2 pts)
- Team U-21 World Championship (Under-21 Speedway World Cup)
  - 2005 - (Czech Republic) Pardubice - 3rd place (2 pts)
  - 2006 - started in Qualifying Round 1 only
  - 2007 - 2nd place in Qualifying Round 1
  - 2008 - (Denmark) Holsted - Runner-up (16 pts)
  - 2009 - (Poland) Gorzów Wlkp. - Runner-up (14 pts)
  - 2010 - (United Kingdom) Rye House - Under-21 World Champion (11 pts)

== European Championships ==
- Individual European Championship
  - 2007 - (Austria) Wiener Neustadt - 3rd place (11 pts)
  - 2008 - 12th place in Semi-Final 1
- Individual U-19 European Championship
  - 2006 - (Croatia) Goričan - 16th place (3 pts)
  - 2007 - (Poland) Częstochowa - 13th place (5 pts)
  - 2008 - (Germany) Stralsund - 4th place (11 pts)
- Team U-19 European Championship
  - 2008 - (Poland) Rawicz - 3rd place (13 pts)

== Domestic competitions ==
- Individual Danish Championship
  - 2005 - 11th place
  - 2006 - 9th place
  - 2007 - 9th place
  - 2008 - 7th place
- Individual U-21 Danish Championship
  - 2005 - 3rd place
  - 2006 - Runner-up
  - 2007 - Danish Champion
  - 2008 - Runner-up
  - 2009 Danish Champion
- Individual U-19 Nordic Championship
  - 2006 - Nordic Champion
- Danish Speedway League
  - 2004 - Danish Champion for team with Holsted
  - 2005 - Danish Champion for team with Holsted
  - 2006 - Danish Champion for team with Fredericia
  - 2007 - Danish Champion for team with Holsted
- Team Polish Championship (Speedway Ekstraliga)
  - 2007 - Polish Champion with Unia Leszno

== See also ==
- Denmark national speedway team
- List of Speedway Grand Prix riders
