= Charlie Gjedde =

Danish speedway rider

- Born: 28 December 1979 (age 46); Holstebro, Denmark
- Nationality: Danish

Career history

Denmark
- 2001–2002: Holsted
- 2004–2005: Fredericia
- 2009: Grindsted
- 2003, 2006–2008, 2010, 2012–2014: Outrup/Varde
- 2016: Holstebro
- 2011: Esbjerg

Great Britain
- 1999, 2002–2005, 2007: Swindon Robins
- 1999: Coventry Bees
- 1999: Wolverhampton Wolves
- 2001, 2006: Reading Racers
- 2003: Oxford Cheetahs
- 2008–2009, 2011: Belle Vue Aces
- 2011: Newport Wasps
- 2011: Berwick Bandits
- 2012: Rye House Rockets
- 2012: Plymouth Devils

Poland
- 1997–1998, 2011: Łódź
- 2002, 2007: Ostrów
- 2003, 2005: Grudziądz
- 2004, 2009: Rzeszów
- 2008: Gdańsk

Sweden
- 1997–2001: Kaparna
- 2002–2004: Vargarna
- 2005–2006: Luxo Stars
- 2008: Rospiggarna

Individual honours
- 1995: Danish Under-21 Champion

Team honours
- 2006: World Cup Winner
- 2004: Elite League Pairs Champion
- 2003: Premier League Fours Champion
- 1997, 2002, 2005: Danish League Champion
- 1997: Allsvenskan League Champion
- 2003: Polish Div 3 Champion

Charlie Rasmussen Gjedde (born 28 December 1979) is a former international motorcycle speedway rider from Denmark, who won the Speedway World Cup with Denmark in 2006. He earned 11 caps for the Denmark national speedway team.

== Career ==
A former Danish Under-21 Champion, Gjedde has represented Denmark in the Speedway World Cup since 2002 and has appeared as a track reserve in the Speedway Grand Prix series three times.

Gjedde first rode in Britain for Swindon Robins during the 1998 Elite League speedway season. The following season in 1999, he signed for Coventry Bees on loan from Swindon. In 2003, he was part of the Swindon four that won the Premier League Four-Team Championship, which was held on 27 July 2003, at the Abbey Stadium.

Gjedde rode for the Belle Vue Aces in the Elite League in 2008, 2009 and 2011.

In 2010, Gjedde rode for Outrup in the Danish Speedway League.

== See also ==
- Denmark national speedway team
