= Sønderjylland Elite Speedway =

Danish speedway club

Club information
- Track address: Vojens Speedway Center; Tinglykke 9, 6500 Vojens
- Country: Denmark
- Founded: 1976–2011 (as VSK); 2020 (as SES)
- Team manager: Claus Ørts
- Team captain: Anders Thomsen
- League: Danish Super League
- Website: Official Website

Club facts
- Track size: 300 metres
- Track record time: 57.1
- Track record date: 17 August 2011
- Track record holder: Michael Jepsen Jensen

Major team honours
Team champions	2022

Sønderjylland Elite Speedway (SES) (English Southern Jutland Elite Speedway) is a motorcycle speedway club from Vojens in Denmark, who compete in the Danish Speedway League. The Vojens speedway team was formerly known as Vojens Speedway Klub.

== Track ==
The club's home venue is the Vojens Speedway Center, which is located about 3 kilometres in a south westerly direction from the centre of Vojens, on Tinglykke 9.

== History ==
=== Vojens Speedway ===
Ole Olsen and Aage Sondergaard formed a company called Speedsport Ltd and in the Spring of 1975, they started construction on a speedway stadium that would meet international specifications. The Vojens Speedway Center was opened on 21 September 1975 and would become an international venue for major speedway events. The following year the mini adjacent speedway track (50 and 80cc machines) was opened by the Vojens Speedway Klub.

The two organisations naturally formed a relationship and a team was created by the Vojens Speedway Klub to race in the Danish Tournament at the Vojens Speedway Center. The leagues were of an amateur nature at the time, the Geopards (Cheetahs) and Goodyear-drengene (Goodyear Boys) were the names of the first team. Other teams were the Fighters and Hunters.

In 1986, the professional Danish Speedway League or Superliga was created, of which Vojens Speedway Klub (VSK) were a founder member. They competed in the Super League from 1986 until 1989, with their first major star being Tommy Knudsen. The team lost their place after finishing last in 1989.

VSK would make further appearances in the Super League in 1996, 1999 and 2002 but could never cement their place in the league. Another attempt started in 2009 and the club managed a third place finish in 2010 but following the 2011 season, the club suffered financial problems and withdrew from the league. VSK only continued to run 50cc and 80cc mini speedway.

=== 2020 to present ===
A new team by the name of Sønderjylland Elite Speedway was created to race at the Vojens Speedway Center in 2020 and replaced the Vojens Speedway Klub.

The team won the Danish Speedway League title during the 2022 Danish speedway season. Riders included Anders Thomsen and Matej Žagar. They topped the table in 2023 but lost in the Super Final.

== Notable riders ==
- (Denmark) Patrick Hougaard
- (Denmark) Tommy Knudsen
- (Denmark) Kenni Larsen
- (Denmark) Bjarne Pedersen
- (Denmark) Jan Stæchmann
- (Denmark) Anders Thomsen
- (Slovenia) Matej Žagar
