= Holstebro Speedway Klub =

Speedway club in Holstebro, Denmark

Club information
- Track address: Skave Speedway, Hesselåvej 41B, 7500 Holstebro, Mid Jutland
- Country: Denmark
- League: Danish Speedway League (div 1)

Major team honours
Team champions	1997

Holstebro Speedway Klub is a motorcycle speedway club from Holstebro in Denmark. They were champions of Denmark, having won the title in 1997.

== Track ==
The track is located about 16 kilometres east of Holestebro on Hesselåvej 41B (south of Skave) and is adjacent to the Holstebro Moto Cross track.

== History ==
=== 1953 to 1967 ===
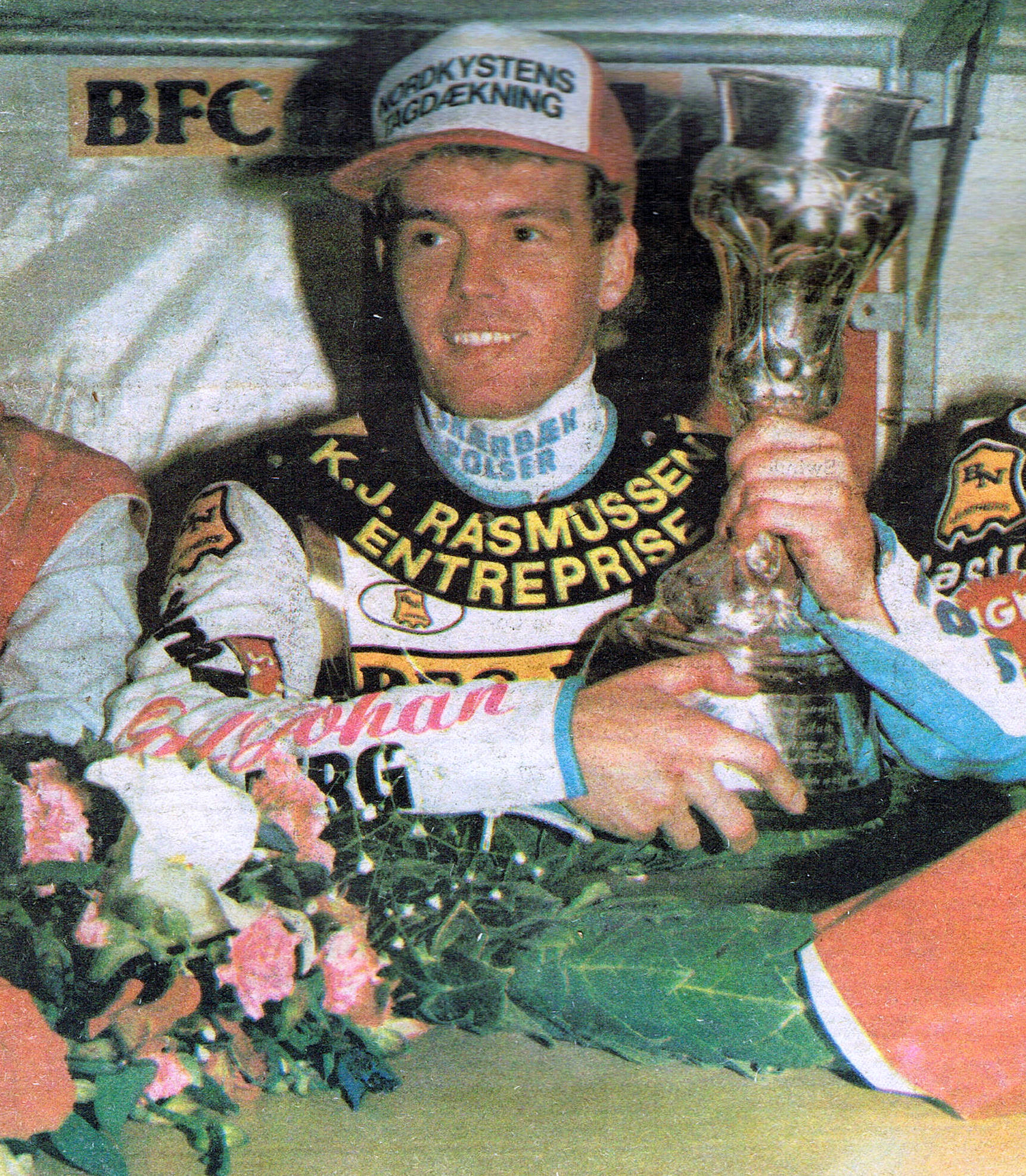
Tommy Knudsen helped the club become Danish champions in 1997

In 1953, Holstebro Motor Klub (HMK) converted the grass track at Naur to a 367-metre speedway track. The track was known as the Naur track because it was just outside Holstebro to the west, by the railway line to Naur. The track hosted significant speedway events but unfortunately, due to financial difficulties the HMK suspended activities in 1967. This coincided with the introduction of the speedway leagues in 1967, resulting in Holstebro not having a team in the league.

=== 1985 to present ===
In 1985, the Holstebro Speedway Klub (HoSK) was formed and with the help of the municipality they were able to build a track in Skave (its current location). The following year the professional Danish Speedway League or Superliga was created.

The team signed the likes of Henka Gustafsson and competed in the 1988 Danish speedway season, performing well but not making the medals. In 1991, they finished third to claim the bronze medal, a feat they repeated in 1996.

It was during the 1997 Danish speedway season that the club achieved their greatest success, led by Tommy Knudsen they won the league title and became champions of Denmark. Knudsen also became the individual champion of Denmark. The rest of the team consisted of Dalle Andersson, Hans Andersen, Bjarne Pedersen and Charlie Gjedde.

Another success came in 1998, with a silver medal. Riders included Nicki Pedersen and Gert Handberg.

The club dropped out of the top league in 2001 but returned in 2007, led by Bjarne Pedersen. Another second-place finish was achieved in 2011. After finishing 6th in 2018, the club dropped out of the top league again and currently race in the lower divisions.

== Notable riders ==
- (Denmark) Hans Andersen
- (Denmark) Kenneth Bjerre
- (Sweden) Henka Gustafsson
- (Denmark) Gert Handberg
- (Denmark) Claus Jacobsen
- (Denmark) Tommy Knudsen
- (Denmark) Bjarne Pedersen
- (Denmark) Nicki Pedersen
