= Mads Korneliussen =

Danish speedway rider

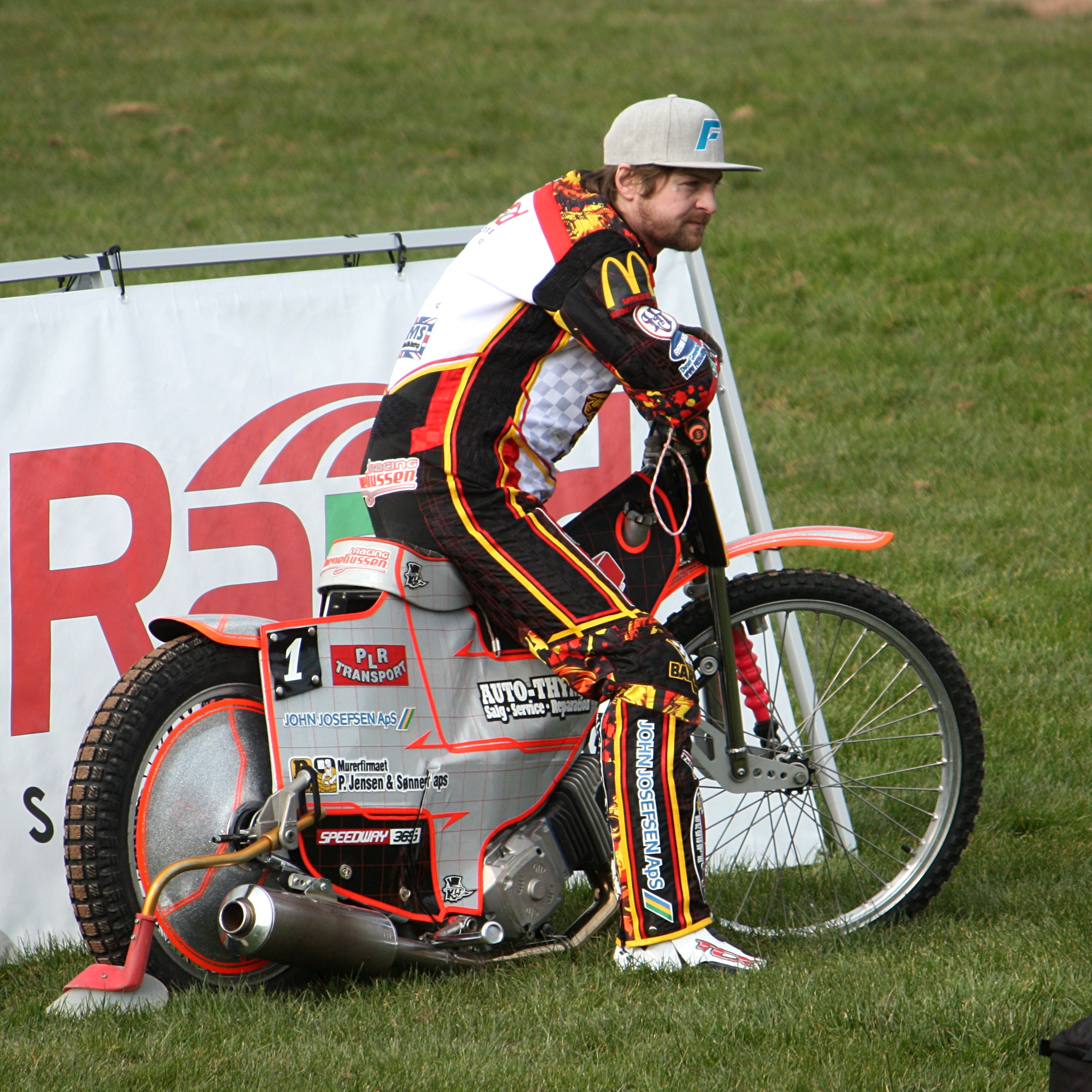
- Born: 15 June 1983 (age 43); Aalborg, Denmark
- Nationality: Danish

Career history

Denmark
- 2001–2006: Slangerup
- 2007–2009: Esbjerg
- 2010–2019: Outrup/Varde

Great Britain
- 2003–2005: Newport Wasps
- 2005–2008, 2010: Swindon Robins
- 2009: Peterborough Panthers
- 2011–2013, 2016: King's Lynn Stars
- 2014: Leicester Lions

Sweden
- 2001–2002: Örnarna
- 2006: Västervik
- 2010, 2012–2015: Rospiggarna
- 2017: Dackarna

Poland
- 2006–2007: Poznań
- 2008–2009, 2013: Ostrów
- 2010: Krosno
- 2012: Lublin
- 2011, 2013, 2016: Kraków
- 2014–2015: Łódź
- 2017: Rybnik

Individual honours
- 1999: Danish Junior Champion

Team honours
- 2008, 2011: Elite Shield Winner
- 2014: Speedway World Cup

Mads Klit Korneliussen (born 15 June 1983) is a Danish former motorcycle speedway rider.

== Career ==
Born in Aalborg, Denmark, Mads Korneliussen is the son of Karl Erik Korneliussen and younger brother of Tim Korneliussen, both former riders. Mads took up speedway in 1993.

Korneliussen came to prominence in 2000 when he reached the final of the 2000 Speedway Under-21 World Championship, where he secured an 11th place finish.

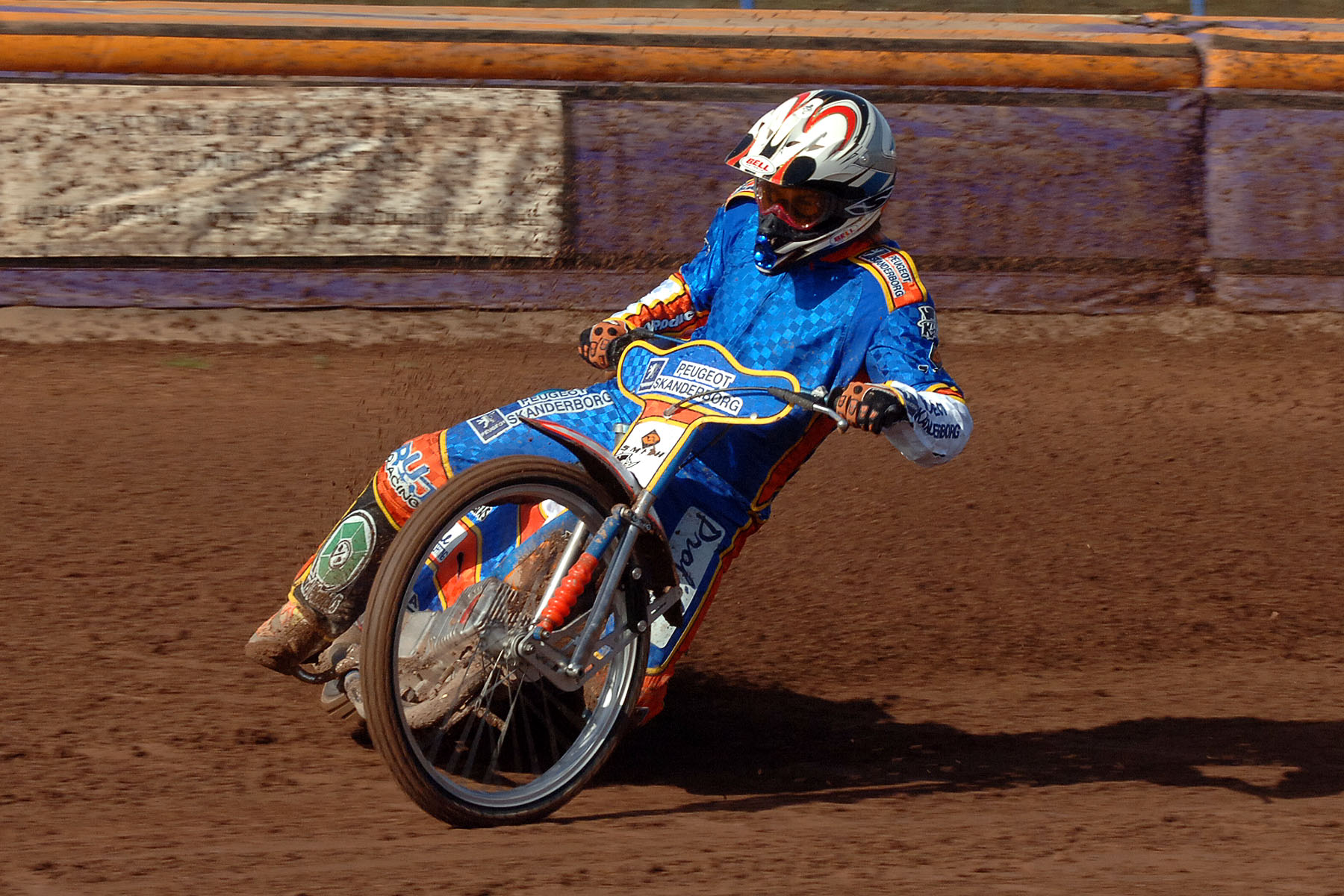
Korneliussen riding for Swindon in 2007

Korneliussen made his debut in British speedway in 2003 with Newport Wasps in the Premier League, also doubling-up in the Elite League in 2005 with Swindon Robins. In 2006 he rode full-time in the Elite League with Swindon. His 2007 season was marred by a series of injuries, but he returned to Swindon in 2008 as part of the team that won the Elite Shield. After a season with Peterborough Panthers in 2009, he returned to Swindon in 2010 before moving to King's Lynn Stars in 2011 where he rode for three seasons.

After being left out of the Stars team for 2014, Korneliussen signed for Leicester Lions. He started the season with his testimonial meeting at King's Lynn marking ten years in British speedway. In 2014, he rode in the Elite Riders Championship as a late replacement for Jason Doyle.

In August 2014, Korneliussen won the Speedway World Cup as part of a Danish team that also included Nicki Pedersen, Niels Kristian Iversen and Peter Kildemand.

Korneliussen's final season in Britain was the 2016 Elite League riding for King's Lynn again, and in 2017, he rode his last season in Poland for Rybnik.
