= Holsted Speedway Klub =

Speedway club in Holsted, Denmark

Holsted Tigers

Club information
- Track address: Holsted Speedway Center; Hedevejen 1, 6670 Holsted
- Country: Denmark
- Founded: 5 November 1974
- League: Danish Super League
- Website: Official Website

Club facts
- Track size: 340 metres

Major team honours
Team champions	1976, 1977, 1978, 1979, 1991, 1994, 1996, 2002, 2003, 2004, 2006, 2007, 2009, 2014, 2021

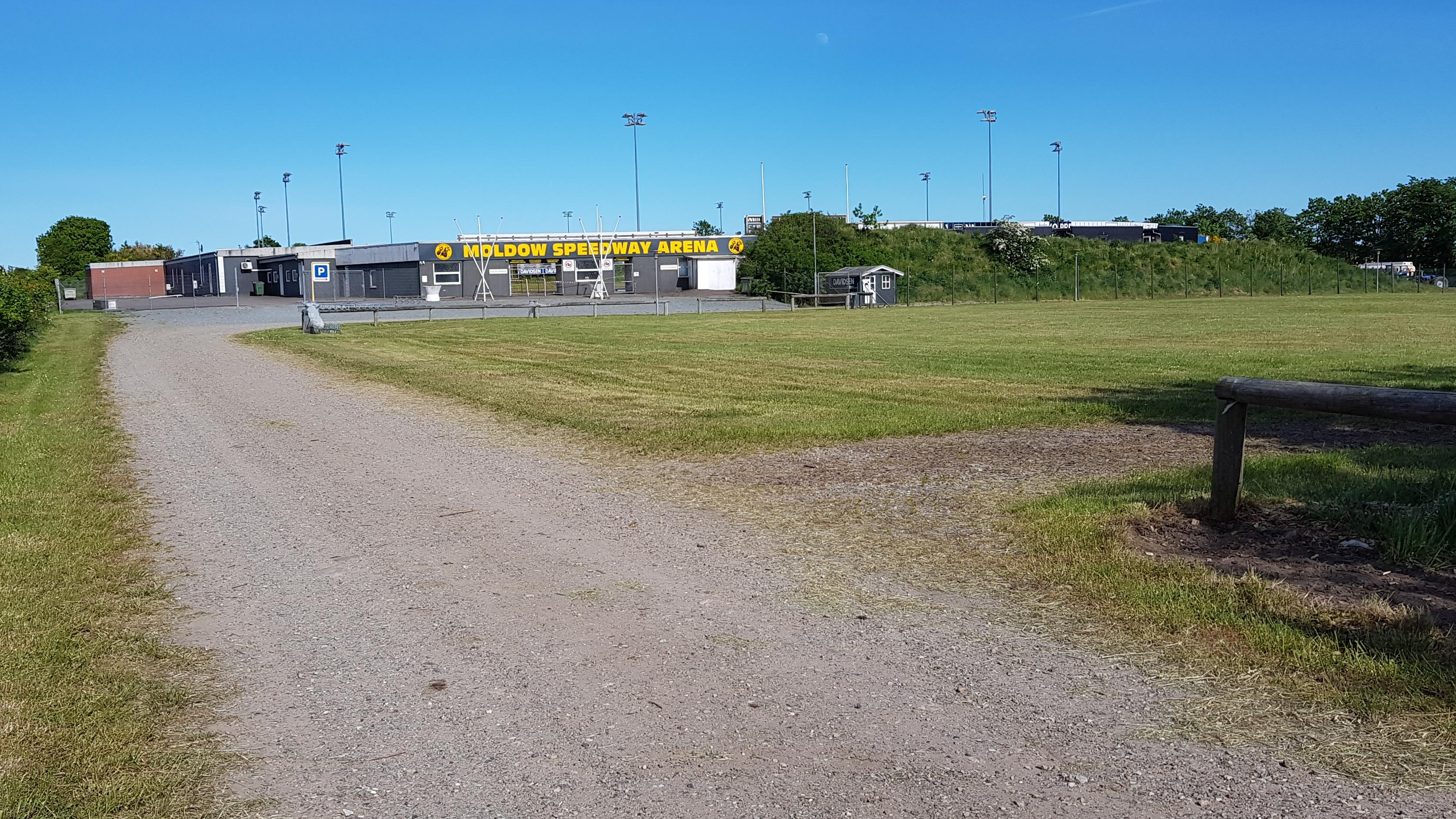
The entrance to the Holsted Speedway Center in 2020

Holsted Speedway Klub or Holsted Tigers is a motorcycle speedway club from Holsted in the Vejen Municipality of Denmark, who compete in the Danish Speedway League. The team have won the Danish Speedway League title a record 15 times.

== Track ==
The team is based at the Holsted Speedway Center, which is located about 7 kilometres south of the centre of Holsted on Hedevejen 1. The track is also known as the Moldow Speedway Arena for sponsorship purposes.

== History ==
=== 1956 to 1973 ===
The first speedway in Holsted was organised by Holsted Motor Sport and took place west of the town, just south of the village of Gørklint on the Holsted stream. The Holsted Gørklint Speedway track was built by the Holsted Motor Sport and used as early as 1956.

=== 1974 to 1988 ===
On 5 November 1974, the Holsted Speedway Klub was founded by a rider called Kurt Bøgh and the team began to use the track. The team immediately applied to the Danish Motor Union (DMU) for membership and although they received it, they were not initially allowed to open to the public. The track size was just 260 metres, which also caused controversy. From 1976, the team continued to battle with the DMU, who had made it clear that the track was too short. Despite the issues, the team won the Danish league for four consecutive years in 1976, 1977, 1978 and 1979. They had three teams competing in the league; the Tigers (the first team), the Panthers and the Wildcats. The professional Danish Speedway League was established in 1986, which put significant pressure on the club to find a new venue.

=== 1989 to 2010 ===
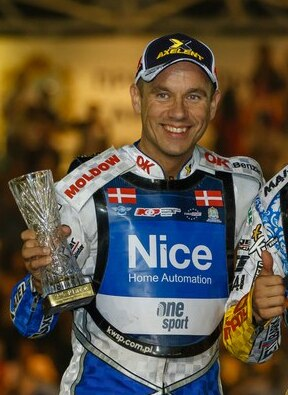
Club legend Nicki Pedersen

In 1989, the club finally found a new venue and moved to its current location. The larger 300 metre track opened on 4 June 1989 and met international regulations so was eligible for major meetings. The club thrived and won the Super League during the 1991 Danish speedway season. They then regularly competed for honours, winning the Super League again in 1994 and 1996. Riders included Gert Handberg, Jan Stæchmann, Brian Karger and Jesper B. Jensen.

Further success was achieved with a spell of six Championships within an eight year period, in 2002, 2003, 2004, 2006, 2007 and 2009. Riders included Nicki Pedersen, Bjarne Pedersen, Niels Kristian Iversen and Patrick Hougaard and the club ended the decade as the dominant team in Danish speedway.

=== 2011 to present ===
Holsted won their 14th and 15th titles in 2014 and 2021 respectively. Nicki Pedersen entered his 20th year with the club in 2023.

== Notable riders ==
- (Denmark) Kenneth Bjerre
- (Denmark) Kurt Bøgh
- (Denmark) Gert Handberg
- (Denmark) Patrick Hougaard
- (Denmark) Niels Kristian Iversen
- (Denmark) Jesper B. Jensen
- (Denmark) Rasmus Jensen
- (Denmark) Brian Karger
- (Denmark) Nicolai Klindt
- (Denmark) Bjarne Pedersen
- (Denmark) Nicki Pedersen
- (Denmark) Jan Stæchmann
