= Region Varde Elitesport =

Speedway club southwest of Outrup, Denmark

Region Varde Elitesport & Outrup Speedway Club

Club information
- Track address: Outrup Speedway Center; Hennevej 35, 6855 Outrup
- Country: Denmark
- Founded: November 1973
- Team manager: Steven R. Andersen & Bjarne Nilsson
- League: Danish Super League
- Website: Official Website

Major team honours
Team champions	1985, 1999, 2001, 2016, 2018

Region Varde Elitesport and Outrup Speedway Club is a motorcycle speedway club southwest of Outrup in the Varde Municipality of Denmark, who compete in the Danish Speedway League. The team have won the Danish Speedway League title five times.

== Track ==
The club's home venue is the Outrup Speedway Center, which is located less than 2 kilometres in a south westerly direction from the centre of Outrup, on Hennevej 35.

== History ==
=== 1973 to 1976 ===
In 1961, a short lived club called Outrup Motor Sport was formed and they built a small dirt track described as being part of the Blåbjerg Klitplantage (dune plantations). Although the club soon folded the track location remained. It was this site that the Outrup Speedway Club (founded in November 1973) chose for the construction of a full size speedway track. After much work the new speedway track was opened on 3 July 1976. The following year in 1977, the club joined the league system called the Danish tournament and rode under the name Blabjergdrengene (the Blåbjerg Boys). The club had other teams called Vestjyderne (West Jutlanders) and Badderne rode in the lower divisions.

In 1985, the Blåbjerg Boys became champions of Denmark. This was the last season before professional league speedway arrived in Denmark.

=== 1986 to 1998 ===
1986 was a pivotal year for the club because they rebuilt the stadium adjacent to the old track. The need for improved facilities and FIM licensing was the reason for the changes. Additionally, the professional Danish Speedway League or Superliga was created, of which Outrup Speedway Club were a founder member. However, their next Super League appearance was not until 1993 and the from 1995 to 1998.

=== 1999 to 2013 ===
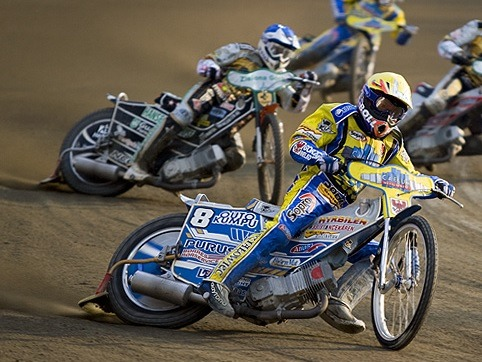
Rune Holta

The team won their second and third Danish Championships (first in the Super League) in 1999 and 2001 respectively. Their Danish contingent included Hans Clausen, Frede Schøtt, Aksel Jepsen, Tom P. Knudsen and Jan Andersen and foreign riders included Rune Holta and Kai Laukkanen. The team lost their Super League place after finishing last in 2008 but made a quick return for 2010.

=== 2014 to present ===
In 2014, the club changed its name from the Outrup Speedway Club to Region Varde Elitesport. After signing Australians Troy Batchelor and Sam Masters in 2016, they won their fourth Championship and repeated the feat in 2018, thanks to their Danish trio of Mikkel Bech, Mads Korneliussen and Hans Andersen.

== Notable riders ==
- (Denmark) Hans Andersen
- (Australia) Troy Batchelor
- (Denmark) Mikkel Bech
- (Denmark) Hans Clausen
- (Denmark) Charlie Gjedde
- (Norway) Rune Holta
- (Denmark) Mads Korneliussen
- (Finland) Kai Laukkanen
- (Australia) Sam Masters
- (Denmark) Frede Schøtt
