= Brovst Speedway Club =

Speedway club in Brovst, Denmark

Club information
- Track address: Brovst Speedway Center, Over Søen 12, 9460 Brovst; North Jutland
- Country: Denmark
- Founded: 1957 (1991 as BSC)
- League: Danish Super League
- Website: Official Website

Club facts
- Track size: 300 metres

Major team honours
Team champions	1990, 1998, 2000

Brovst Speedway Club also known as Nordjysk Elite Speedway (North Jutland) is a motorcycle speedway club from Brovst in Denmark, who competed in the Danish Speedway League until 2010, and then again in 2021. They are three times champions of Denmark, having won the title in 1990, 1998 and 2000.

== Track ==
The home venue of the club is the Brovst Speedway Center, which is located north of Brovst on the Over Søen 12, from Brovst to Tranum.

== History ==
=== 1957 to 1991 ===
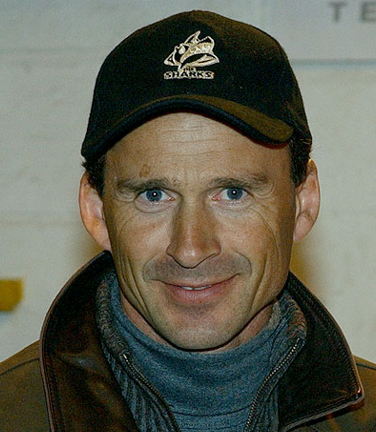
Club legend Hans Nielsen

The club was founded by name in 1991 but previous to this the origins of the club were started in 1957, with the founding of the Han Herreds Motor Klub (HaMK). In 1973, HaMK opened a speedway track in Mou Kær, the club had previously ran Motocross events. The new speedway track was a small track used mainly for 50cc machines. Two visitors to the track were two young boys called Hans Nielsen and his older brother Jens Henry Nielsen

In 1977, the venue experienced some issues about being able to use the track, which actually resulted in the municipality then helping the club build a new 300 metres international dimensions track. It was built on the outside of the existing smaller track and was open by 1980. Teams called Hanerne Hanherred (the Roosters) and Ravnene (the Ravens) competed in the amateur leagues until 1985) before the introduction of the professional Danish Speedway League (which was established in 1986). The venue was also used for the 1984 Danish Speedway Championship.

The team would be called HaMK Brovst for the Super League and they were fortunate enough to have the Nielsen brothers still riding for them despite Hans' commitments in the British league. The team won the Danish Speedway League in 1990.

=== 1991 to 2010 ===
At the club's 1991 AGM, HaMK agreed to split, with a new speedway team called Brovst Speedway Club, while HaMK retained the motocross element.

The team continued to compete at the highest level and during the 1998 Danish speedway season, they won their second league title. Hans Nielsen, now in his late 30's was still one of the world's leading riders and topped the league averages for the club again. A new set of riders arrived at the club when Nielsen retired and they included Nicki Pedersen, Hans Andersen and Gert Handberg. This helped the club win a third league title in 2000.

The next ten years were spent battling in the top league but gaining little success. After the 2010 Danish speedway season they would drop out of the league altogether.

=== 2021 to present ===
A year after the COVID-19 pandemic cancelled season, an announcement was made that a new team called Nordjysk Elite Speedway would compete during the 2021 Danish speedway season. The team was branded as the Elite department of the Brovst Speedway Club and the venue was branded as the Sparekassen Danmark Speedway Arena. They signed Leon Madsen but only managed a 7th-place finish out of 8 teams. Worse was to come when during the 2022 Danish speedway season the club folded due to financial issues and their results were expunged. The DMU stated that they would not be able to return to the league until 2024.

== Notable riders ==
- (Denmark) Hans Andersen
- (Denmark) Gert Handberg
- (Denmark) Leon Madsen
- (Denmark) Hans Nielsen
- (Denmark) Nicki Pedersen
