= 1990 British Speedway Championship =

Seasons
- ← 1989 1991 →

The 1990 British Speedway Championship was the 30th edition of the British Speedway Championship. The Final took place on 20 May at Brandon in Coventry, England. The Championship was won by Kelvin Tatum, while Simon Cross won a run off against Jeremy Doncaster for second place.

== Quarter finals ==
=== Quarter Final 1 ===
- 5 April 1990
- (England) Middlesbrough

Pos.	Rider	Points	Details
1	Gary Havelock	15	
2	Les Collins	14	
3	Mark Courtney	12	
4	David Blackburn	12	
5	Daz Sumner	11	
6	Jeremy Luckhurst	10	
7	Andy Hackett	8	
8	Kenny McKinna	6	
9	Martin Dixon	6	
10	Steve Lawson	6	
11	Sean Courtney	5	
12	Bryan Larner	5	
13	David Walsh	5	
14	Tony Richardson	2	
15	Duncan Chapman	2	
16	Mike Lewthwaite	1	
17	Mark Robinson	0	

=== Quarter Final 2 ===
- 5 April 1990
- (England) Ipswich

Pos.	Rider	Points	Details
1	Alan Mogridge	13	
2	Chris Louis	12	
3	Mark Loram	12	
4	Martin Goodwin	11	
5	Andy Galvin	11	
6	Dean Standing	11	
7	Carl Blackbird	9	
8	Steve Schofield	8	
9	Neville Tatum	8	
10	Paul Whittaker	7	
11	David Norris	6	
12	Rob Tilbury	4	
13	Nathan Simpson	4	
14	Roger Jones	2	
15	Paul Woods	1	
16	Chris White	1	
17	Andy Buck	0	

=== Quarter Final 3 ===
- 21 April 1990
- (England) Stoke

Pos.	Rider	Points	Details
1	Nigel Crabtree	14	
2	Dean Barker	13	
3	Alun Rossiter	12	
4	Louis Carr	10	
5	Andy Grahame	10	
6	Alastair Stevens	9	
7	Richard Green	9	
8	Eric Monaghan	8	
9	Ray Morton	8	
10	Ian Barney	5	
11	Carl Stonehewer	5	
12	Paul Dugard	4	
13	Gary Chessell	4	
14	Peter Jeffrey	4	
15	Michael Coles	3	
16	Richard Davidson	1	
17	Joe Hughes	1	
18	Garry Stead	0	

== Semi finals ==
=== Semi Final 1 ===
- 6 May 1990
- (England) Cradley Heath

Pos.	Rider	Points	Details
1	Gary Havelock	14	
2	Simon Cross	13	
3	Andrew Silver	12	
4	Kelvin Tatum	11	
5	Les Collins	9	
6	Nigel Crabtree	9	
7	Mark Loram	8	
8	Paul Thorp	7	
9	Neil Collins	7	
10	Alun Rossiter	7	
11	Sean Wilson	6	
12	Alan Grahame	6	
13	Andy Grahame	4	
14	Andy Phillips	4	
15	Marvyn Cox	1	
16	Martin Goodwin	1	
17	David Haynes	0	
17	Rob Horner	0	

- Neil Collins replaced Nigel Crabtree in the final.

Alun Rossiter was promoted to reserve.

=== Semi Final 2 ===
- 6 May 1990
- (England) King's Lynn

Pos.	Rider	Points	Details
1	Jeremy Doncaster	15	
2	Richard Knight	12	
3	Andy Smith	12	
4	Chris Louis	10	
5	John Davis	10	
6	Martin Dugard	9	
7	Graham Jones	7	
8	Simon Wigg	8	
9	Neil Evitts	8	
10	Dean Barker	6	
11	Joe Screen	6	
12	Louis Carr	5	
13	Alan Mogridge	4	
14	Chris Morton	3	
15	Dave Mullett	2	
16	Mark Courtney	0	
17	Tommy Grinstead	0	

== British Final ==
- 20 May 1990
- (England) Brandon Stadium, Coventry
- Top 10 to Commonwealth final (as part of the 1990 World Championship)

Pos.	Rider	Points	Details
Gold	Kelvin Tatum	13	(2,2,3,3,3)
Silver	Simon Cross	11+3	(3,2,2,2,2)
Bronze	Jeremy Doncaster	11+2	(3,1,1,3,3)
4	Gary Havelock	10	(1,3,3,3,0)
5	Martin Dugard	9	(2,3,2,2,0)
6	Mark Loram	9	(2,1,1,2,3)
7	Graham Jones	7	(3,0,2,1,1)
8	Simon Wigg	6	(E,3,1,0,2)
9	John Davis	6	(1,E,3,0,2)
10	Richard Knight	6	(0,3,0,M,3)
11	Paul Thorp	6	(0,0,3,2,1)
12	Chris Louis	5	(3,2,0,0,0)
13	Les Collins	5	(1,0,1,3,1)
14	Andy Smith	5	(2,1,2,X,0)
15	Neil Collins	5	(1,0,1,1,2)
16	Andrew Silver	5	(1,2,0,1,1)
17	Paul Bromwich	1	(1)

== British Under 21 final ==
Joe Screen won the British Speedway Under 21 Championship. The final was held at Wimbledon Stadium on 11 July.

Pos.	Rider	Points
1	Joe Screen	14+3
2	Mark Loram	14+2
3	Chris Louis	13+3
4	Nathan Simpson	13+2
5	Dean Standing	8
6	Carl Stonehewer	7
7	Gary Tagg	7
8	Richard Musson	7
9	Simon Wolstenholme	6
10	David Clarke	6
11	Chris Cobby	6
12	Simon Green	5
13	Darren Grayling	5
14	Scott Robson	4
15	Kevin Little	2
16	Mark Simmons	2

== See also ==
- British Speedway Championship
- 1990 Individual Speedway World Championship
