= 1989 British Speedway Championship =

Seasons
- ← 1988 1990 →

The 1989 event was the 29th edition of the British Speedway Championship. The Final took place on 21 May at Brandon stadium in Coventry, England. Simon Wigg won the championship, while Kelvin Tatum beat Alan Grahame in a run-off for second place.

== British Final ==
- 21 May 1989
- (England) Brandon Stadium, Coventry

Pos.	Rider	Points	Details
Gold	(England) Simon Wigg	14	(2,3,3,3,3)
Silver	(England) Kelvin Tatum	12+3	(3,3,3,0,3)
Bronze	(England) Alan Grahame	12+2	(3,2,1,3,3)
4	(England) Les Collins	11	(1,3,2,3,2)
5	(England) Andy Phillips	10	(3,1,3,1,2)
6	(England) Andy Grahame	7	(2,3,X,2,0)
7	(England) Martin Dugard	7	(0,2,3,2,0)
8	(England) Neil Collins	7	(3,2,1,X,1)
9	(England) Andy Smith	7	(2,0,1,2,2)
10	(England) Jeremy Doncaster	7	(1,2,2,X,2)
11	(England) Neil Evitts	6	(2,1,2,X,1)
12	(England) John Davis	5	(X,0,0,2,3)
13	(England) Mark Courtney	5	(1,1,1,1,1)
14	(England) Graham Jones	4	(0,1,0,3,X)
15	(England) Andrew Silver	4	(1,0,2,1,0)
16	(England) Marvyn Cox	2	(0,X,0,1,1)
17	(England) Neville Tatum	DNS	
18	(England) Simon Cross	DNS	

== British Under 21 final ==
The 1989 British Speedway Under 21 Championship, the 21st staging of the event, was won by Martin Dugard. The final was held on 11 June at Arlington Stadium, Hailsham . . The event also included race victories for eventual Speedway World Championship riders Chris Louis and Joe Screen.

Pos.	Rider	Heat Scores	Total	Run-Off
1	Martin Dugard	(3,3,3,3,3)	15	
2	Chris Louis	(2,3,2,3,3)	13	+3
3	Dean Barker	(3,3,2,2,3)	13	+2
4	Andy Hackett	(3,2,3,2,2)	12	
5	Dean Standing	(1,2,3,3,3)	12	
6	Alistair Stevens	(2,X,1,3,2)	8	
7	Joe Screen	(3,T,2,2,X)	7	
8	David Norris	(2,1,3,E,1)	7	
9	Justin Walker	(0,3,1,1,1)	6	
10	Simon Wolstenholme	(1,1,X,1,2)	5	
11	Wayne Garrett	(E,1,2,X,2)	5	
12	Nathan Simpson	(1,2,0,1,0)	4	
13	Paul Dugard	(1,0,1,F,1)	3	
14	Steve Masters	(2,F,0,1,0)	3	
15	Adrian Stevens	(0,2,0,0,1)	3	
16	Darren Standing	(F,0,1,2,0)	3	
Res	Darren Grayling	(1)	1	

== See also ==
- British Speedway Championship
- 1989 Individual Speedway World Championship
