= 1991 British Speedway Championship =

Motorcycle speedway British Championship season

Seasons
- ← 1990 1992 →

The 1991 British Speedway Championship was the 31st edition of the British Speedway Championship. The Final took place on 19 May at Brandon in Coventry, England. The Championship was won by Gary Havelock, who won a scored a 15-point maximum. Kelvin Tatum finished second, with Chris Louis completing the rostrum in third.

== Quarter-finals ==
- Top 32 riders to British semi-finals

Date	Venue	Winner	2nd	3rd
14 April	Brough Park, Newcastle upon Tyne	Peter Carr	Louis Carr	Nigel Crabtree
15 April	County Ground Stadium, Exeter	Steve Schofield	Gordon Kennett	Richard Green
21 April	Hackney Wick Stadium, London	Andy Grahame	Alan Mogridge	Nathan Simpson

== Semi-finals ==
- 2 May
- (England) Foxhall Stadium, Ipswich
- Top 8 to British final

Pos.	Rider	Points
1	Andy Smith	11
2	Jeremy Doncaster	11
3	Sean Wilson	10
4	Joe Screen	9
5	Chris Louis	9
6	Richard Knight	8
7	Mark Loram	8
8	Dave Mullett	8
9	Alan Mogridge	8
10	Dean Barker	8
11	Simon Wigg	7
12	Marvyn Cox	7
13	Gordon Kennett	6
14	Richard Green	5
15	Melvyn Taylor	3
16	Nathan Simpson	2

- 5 May
- (England) Dudley Wood Stadium, Dudley
- Top 8 to British final

Pos.	Rider	Points
1	Steve Schofield	12
2	Alan Grahame	11+3
3	Martin Dugard	11+2
4	Kelvin Tatum	10
5	Neil Collins	10
6	John Davis	9
7	Gary Havelock	9
8	Paul Thorp	8
9	Neil Evitts	7
10	Andy Grahame	7
11	Carl Stonehewer	6
12	Louis Carr	5
13	Graham Jones	5
14	Andrew Silver	5
15	Peter Carr	4
16	Nigel Crabtree	1
17	Mark Meredith (res)	0

== Final ==
- 19 May 1991
- Top 10 riders qualify for the Commonwealth final as part of the 1991 World Championship
- (England) Brandon Stadium, Coventry

Pos.	Rider	Points	Details
Gold	Gary Havelock	15	(3,3,3,3,3)
Silver	Kelvin Tatum	13	(1,3,3,3,3)
Bronze	Chris Louis	11	(X,3,3,3,2)
4	Paul Thorp	10	(3,3,1,0,3)
5	Jeremy Doncaster	10	(1,2,3,2,2)
6	Neil Collins	9	(2,2,1,1,3)
7	Andy Smith	8	(3,1,2,0,2)
8	Martin Dugard	8	(3,2,2,0,1)
9	Sean Wilson	7	(2,X,2,1,2)
10	Joe Screen	7	(2,2,0,2,1)
11	Mark Loram	5	(2,0,2,1,0)
12	John Davis	5	(0,0,1,3,1)
13	Alan Grahame	4	(1,1,0,2,X)
14	Richard Knight	3	(1,1,X,0,1)
15	Dave Mullett	3	(X,1,1,1,0)
16	Steve Schofield	2	(0,0,0,2,0)
17	Lee Coleman	0	(X)
18	Alan Mogridge	DNS	
19	Andy Grahame	DNS	

== See also ==
- British Speedway Championship
- 1991 Individual Speedway World Championship
