= 1989 Individual Speedway World Championship =

Motorcycle speedway world championship season

Seasons
- ← 1988 1990 →

The 1989 Individual Speedway World Championship was the 44th edition of the official World Championship to determine the world champion rider. It was the second time the championship was held in West Germany after previously being held in Norden in 1983.

The World Final was held at the Olympic Stadium in Munich. Hans Nielsen made up for his 1988 run-off defeat to Erik Gundersen by scoring a 15-point maximum to take his third World Championship. Nielsen joined fellow Danes Ole Olsen and Erik Gundersen as a three time speedway world champion.

Simon Wigg from England finished second with the slick, 400 metres (440 yards) track suiting his long track style. Wigg defeated fellow Englishman Jeremy Doncaster in a run-off for second and third places. In what would prove to be his last World Final before his career ending crash in the World Team Cup Final at the Odsal Stadium in England just two weeks later, Erik Gundersen finished in fourth place. His chances of an outright second-place finish (after having finished second behind Nielsen in Heat 4) ended when his bike's engine seized while leading heat 9 causing him to not finish the race. In a sad twist, it was also seized engine in Heat 1 of the World Team Cup Final that would cause Gundersen's career ending crash.

Australian rider Troy Butler had a lucky passage to the World Final. After being seeded to the Commonwealth Final, he finished eighth to qualify for the Overseas Final. He then finished tenth in the Overseas Final to be the first reserve for the Intercontinental Final. He then got a start in the Intercontinental Final at Bradford when Overseas champion Sam Ermolenko injured his back in a horrific Long track motorcycle racing crash and was forced to withdraw (the American would be out for over 6 months). Butler would finish twelfth in the IC Final to become a reserve for the World Final where he once again came in as an injury replacement when Dane Jan O. Pedersen was forced to pull out. The 1986 Australian Champion ultimately finished twelfth in Munich, finishing with 4 points (two second places) from his 5 rides.

== First round ==
=== British qualification ===
- Top 32 riders to British semi-finals

Date	Venue	Winner	2nd	3rd
8 April	Arena Essex Raceway, Purfleet	Andy Buck	Martin Goodwin	Neville Tatum
8 April	Loomer Road Stadium, Chesterton	Louis Carr	Nigel Crabtree	Graham Jones
13 April	Cleveland Park Stadium, Middlesbrough	Les Collins	Sean Wilson	Mark Courtney

== Second Round ==
=== Austrian Final ===
- (Austria) Riders progress to Continental qualification 1989
- 3 rounds

Pos.	Rider	Total
1	Heinrich Schatzer	40
2	Walter Nebel	36
3	Robert Funk	35
4	Andreas Bossner	33
5	Thomas Stadler	33
6	Toni Pilotto	32
7	Siegfried Eder	31
8	Christian Hochtl	21
9	Anton Wannasek	7
10	Manfred Trisko	6
11	Paul Ager	4
12	Josef Faching	2
13	Thaddaus Walach	2
14	Hans Kogler	2
15	Erich Hackl	1
16	Rainer Selb	1
17	Franz Penz	0

=== West German Final ===
- 2 October 1988
- (West Germany) Holsteinring, Brokstedt
- Riders progress to Continental qualification 1989

Pos.	Rider	Scores	Total
1	Klaus Lausch	3,3,3,3,2	14+3
2	Tommy Dunker	3,3,2,3,3	14+2
3	Karl Maier	2,2,3,3,2	12
4	Gerd Riss	E,3,3,2,3	11
5	Carsten Pelzmann	3,2,2,2,1	10
6	Andre Pollehn	2,1,2,2,1	8
7	Klaus Freundorfer	1,3,3,F,-	7
8	Peter Schrock	0,2,0,2,3	7
9	Peter Hehlert	3,0,1,1,2	7
10	Andreas Rahn	1,0,1,1,3	6
11	Andreas Marynowski	1,2,2,F,-	5
12	Andreas Schapfl	2,1,1,E,0	4
13	Hans Faltermeier	2,0,0,F,1	3
14	Michael Domes	1,F,0,0,2	3
15	Alois Bachhuber	0,1,1,1,0	3
16	Egon Muller	F,-,-,-,-	0
R1	Bernhard Osterlocher	1,0,3,1,1	6

=== Hungarian Final ===
- (Hungary)
- 5 rounds, riders progress to Continental qualification 1989

Pos.	Rider	Total
1	Zoltán Adorján	56
2	Antal Kocso	49
3	Róbert Nagy	47
4	Zoltan Hajdu	47
5	József Petrikovics	46
6	Sándor Tihanyi	45
7	Robert Csilik	38
8	Sandor Ujhelyi	30
9	Janoš Sereš	30
10	Janoš Bologh	28
11	Andraš Kovacs	26
12	Sandor Kabai	19
13	Atilla Kovacs	15
14	Laszlo Bodi	12

=== Yugoslavian Final ===
- (Socialist Federal Republic of Yugoslavia)
- 8 rounds, riders progress to Continental qualification 1989

Pos.	Rider	Total
1	Zvonko Pavlič	110
2	Artur Horvat	96
3	Gregor Pintar	83
4	Franc Kalin	79
5	Kreso Omerzel	78
6	Martin Peterca	76
7	Darko Tominač	70
8	Zdravko Tominač	62
9	Andrej Matjašeč	57
10	Lazar Csaba	54
11	Goran Hoblaj	54
12	Igor Hauptman	33
13	Rudi Spitaler	27
14	Zelkjo Feher	23
15	Drago Dolinšek	22
16	Josip Lehki	10
17	Mitja Pungašič]	8
18	Niko Klavzar	6
19	Gorazd Vinšek	1

=== Czechoslovak Final ===
- Riders progress to Continental qualification 1989
- 6 rounds

Pos.	Rider	Total
1	Roman Matoušek	76
2	Antonín Kasper Jr.	72
3	Zdenek Schneiderwind	68
4	Lubomír Jedek	63
5	Petr Vandírek	54
6	Bohumil Brhel	53
7	Stanislav Urban	53
8	Pavel Karnas	39
9	Josef Fejfar	38
10	Jan Schinagl	35
11	Jan Holub II	26
12	Zdeněk Tesař	26
13	Bořivoj Hádek	25
14	Jiří Svoboda	23
15	Vladimír Kalina	21
16	Jindřich Dominik	16
17	Václav Milík, Sr.	10
18	Ladislav Hrádecký	10
19	Karel Průša	10

=== Soviet Union Final ===
- 2 October 1988
- (Soviet Union) Rivne Speedway Stadium, Rivne
- Rriders progress to Continental Qualification 1989

Pos.	Rider	Scores	Total
1	Vladimir Trofimov	3,3,3,3,3	15
2	Rif Saitgareev	3,3,3,2,3	14
3	Rinat Mardanshin	3,2,2,3,2	12
4	Mikhail Starostin	2,2,2,3,2	11
5	Pavel Chernov	2,1,3,2,2	10
6	Igor Dubinin	E,3,2,3,1	9
7	Flyur Kalimullin	3,0,0,1,3	7
8	Igor Zverev	1,E,3,2,1	7
9	Arkady Kononec	1,0,1,1,3	6
10	Andrej Korzhevoy	1,3,1,0,1	6
11	Oleg Volokhov	1,2,1,0,2	6
12	Valery Sokolov	2,2,F,1,1	6
13	Grigory Kharchenko	0,1,1,2,0	4
14	Aleksandr Pawlov	2,F,0,1,-	3
15	Fjodor Zakharov	0,T,2,0,-	2
16	Ruslan Koval	ns	

=== Nederlands/Belgium Final ===
- (Netherlands) (Belgium)
- 4 rounds, riders progress to Continental Qualification

Pos.	Rider	Scores	Total
1	Henk Steman	24+22+20+24	90
2	Rene Elzinga	21+21+24+23	89
3	Robert Jan Munnecom	19+24+23+22	88
4	Peter Seur	17+19+22+20	78
5	Ron Koppe	20+20+19+19	78
6	Rikus Gorter	18+14+17+21	70
7	Ron Van Dam	15+17+18+17	67
8	Rob Steman	22+18+21+ns	61
9	Fokke Van Der Walle	16+13+14+15	58
10	Henk Bangma	8+15+16+18	57
11	Patrick Pino	14+11+15+16	56
12	John Lispet	13+12+13+9	47
13	Henny Kroeze	23+23+ns+ns	46
14	Rias Kazemeier	9+10+11+10	40
15	Gerard Kok	10+ns+12+12	34
16	Harry Kuipers	6+8+8+11	33
17	Hilbert Tel	ns+7+10+13	30
18	Rene Van Merkenstein	7+9+9+2	27
19	Mans Kok	3+6+ns+7	16
20	Wil Stroes	ns+16+ns+ns	16
21	Jim Groen	ns+ns+7+8	15
22	Rob Dolman	ns+ns+ns+14	14
23	Jan Dijkema	12+ns+ns+ns	12
24	Chris Slager	11+ns+ns+ns	11
25	Roy Wervaard	5+5+ns+ns	10
26	Herman Hulseboch	ns+ns+5+4	9
27	Han Hendriks	4+4+ns+ns	8
28	Jan Tjassing	ns+ns+3+1	4
29	Martinus Bikema	+ns+ns+ns+6	6
30	Jacco Valentejn	+ns+ns+ns+5	5
31	Michel Bolt	ns+ns+ns+3	3

=== Australian qualification ===
Date	Championship	Venue	Winner	2nd	3rd
26 Nov '88	Northern Territory	Tennant Creek Speedway	Jamie Fagg	Glen Baxter	Robbie War
26 Dec '88	Victorian	Olympic Park, Mildura	Leigh Adams	Phil Crump	Nigel Alderton
21 Dec '88	New South Wales	Liverpool City Raceway, Green Valley	Stephen Davies	Craig Boyce	Tony Primmer
23 Dec '88	South Australian	North Arm Speedway, Gillman	Craig Hodgson	Mark Fiora	Shane Parker
12 Nov '88	Queensland	Rockhampton Showground	Troy Butler	Steve Regeling	Mark Pearce
25 Nov '88	Western Australian	Claremont Speedway, Perth	Glenn Doyle	Andy Smith+	Glyn Taylor

+ Rode as a guest

=== British semi-finals ===
- 5 May
- (England) Oxford Stadium, Oxford
- Top 8 to British final

Pos.	Rider	Points
1	Simon Wigg	13
2	John Davis	12+3
3	Andrew Silver	12+2
4	Jeremy Doncaster	11
5	Martin Dugard	11
6	Marvyn Cox	10
7	Mark Courtney	9
8	Andy Grahame	9
9	Neville Tatum	6
10	Carl Blackbird	5
11	Dave Mullett	5
12	Richard Knight	4
13	Gordon Kennett	4
14	Alan Mogridge	3
15	Andy Buck	2
16	Daz Summer	2
17	Kevin Pitts (res)	2

- 8 May
- (England) Monmore Green Stadium, Wolverhampton
- Top 8 to British final

Pos.	Rider	Points
1	Alan Grahame	13+3
2	Andy Smith	13+2
3	Kelvin Tatum	11
4	Les Collins	10
5	Neil Collins	10
6	Neil Evitts	10
7	Graham Jones	10
8	Andy Phillips	8+2
9	Simon Cross	8+2
10	Martin Goodwin	7
11	Sean Wilson	7
12	Chris Morton	5
13	Gary Chessell	3
14	Nigel Crabtree	3
15	Louis Carr	2
16	Paul Thorp	0
17	Ade Hoole (res)	0

== Third round ==
=== Continental preliminary round ===
- Riders progress to Continental quarter-finals

Date	Venue	Winner	2nd	3rd
22 April	(Poland) Polonia Bydgoszcz Stadium	(Poland) Piotr Świst	(Poland) Jacek Gomólski	(Czechoslovakia) Václav Milík Sr.
23 April	(Czechoslovakia) Slaný Speedway Stadium, Slaný	(Czechoslovakia) Stanislav Urban	(Poland) Andrzej Marynowski	(Czechoslovakia) Bohumil Brhel
22 April	(Hungary) Borsod Volán Stadion, Miskolc	(Hungary) Jozsef Petrikovics	(Hungary) Robert Csillik	(Hungary) Janos Seres
7 May	(Socialist Federal Republic of Yugoslavia) Matija Gubec Stadium, Krško	(Poland) Antoni Skupień	(Czechoslovakia) Zdenek Tesar	(Czechoslovakia) Jan Schinagl

=== Swedish qualification ===
- Top 8 in each heat to Swedish final

(30 April, Målilla Motorbana, Målilla)
Pos	Rider	Points
1	Conny Ivarsson	12
2	Peter Nahlin	12
3	Mikael Ritterwall	10
4	Niklas Karlsson	9
5	Dennis Löfqvist	9
6	Tommy Nilsson	9
7	Jimmy Nilsen	9
8	Erik Stenlund	9
9	Kenneth Lindby	9
10	Christer Jonsson	9
11	Stefan Andersson	7
12	Tony Gudbrand	6
13	Lars Andersson	4
14	Tomas Karlsson	2
15	Tony Samuelsson	1
16	Kent Danielsson	1
17	Tony Zetterström (res)	1
18	Christer Johansson Esk (res)	1

(1 May, Gamla Galgberget, Visby)
Pos	Rider	Points
1	Tony Olsson	13
2	Per Jonsson	13
3	Jan Andersson	12
4	Mikael Teurnberg	11
5	Christer Rohlén	10
6	Peter Karlsson	8
7	Mikael Blixt	8
8	Tommy Lindgren	7
9	Kenneth Nyström	6
10	Claes Ivarsson	6
11	Tony Rickardsson	6
12	Mikael Löfqvist	5
13	Jörgen Johansson	4
14	Kristian Hultgren	4
15	Patrik Karlsson	3
16	Bo Arrhén	2
17	Patric Eriksson (res)	2
18	Jan Bergqvist (res)	1

=== British Final ===
- 21 May
- (England) Brandon Stadium, Coventry
- First 10 to Commonwealth final plus 1 reserve

Pos.	Rider	Points	Details
	Simon Wigg	14	(2,3,3,3,3)
	Kelvin Tatum	12+3	(3,3,3,0,3)
	Alan Grahame	12+2	(3,2,1,3,3)
4	Les Collins	11	(1,3,2,3,2)
5	Andy Phillips	10	(3,1,3,1,2)
6	Andy Grahame	7	(2,3,X,2,0)
7	Martin Dugard	7	(0,2,3,2,0)
8	Neil Collins	7	(3,2,1,X,1)
9	Andy Smith	7	(2,0,1,2,2)
10	Jeremy Doncaster	7	(1,2,2,X,2)
11	Neil Evitts	6	(2,1,2,X,1)
12	John Davis	5	(X,0,0,2,3)
13	Mark Courtney	5	(1,1,1,1,1)
14	Graham Jones	4	(0,1,0,3,X)
15	Andrew Silver	4	(1,0,2,1,0)
16	Marvyn Cox	2	(0,X,0,1,1)

=== Australian Final ===
- (Australia) 15 January, Newcastle Motordrome
- Winner (+ Stephen Davies & Troy Butler seeded) to Commonwealth final

Pos.	Rider	Total
1	Glenn Doyle	13
2	Stephen Davies	12
3	Jamie Fagg	11
4	Mick Poole	11
5	Steve Regeling	11
6	Phil Crump	10
7	Craig Boyce	10
8	Troy Butler	7
9	Leigh Adams	6
10	Glyn Baxter	6
11	Craig Hodgson	6
12	Glyn Taylor	6
13	Chris Watson	5
14	Mark Fiora	3
15	Shane Parker	2
16	Tony Primmer	1
17	Brian Nixon (res)	0

=== New Zealand Final ===
- First 2 (+ Mitch Shirra seeded) to Commonwealth final
- (New Zealand) 28 January, Western Springs Stadium

Pos.	Rider	Total
1	Larry Ross	15
2	Gary Allan	14
3	Mark Thorpe	12
4	Nathan Murray	12
5	Stephen Rose	10
6	Craig Wilkie	9
7	John Roberts	8
8	Justin Monk	7
9	Mark Jamieson	6
10	Greg Fisher	6
11	David Claydon	6
12	Rex Brosnan	5
13	Richard Davdison	3
14	Bradley Sockton	3
15	Darren Hopewell	2
16	Scott Mitchell	1
17	Geoff Tomkins	1

== Fourth Round ==
=== Continental quarter-finals ===
- To 32 to Continental semi-finals

Date	Venue	Winner	2nd	3rd
14 May	(Austria) Stadion Wiener Neustadt	(Hungary) Sandor Tihanyi	(Hungary) Zoltán Adorján	(Italy) Armando Castagna
3 June	(Poland) Zielona Góra Speedway Stadium	(Hungary) Antal Kocso	(Poland) Ryszard Franczyszyn	(Poland) Andrzej Huszcza
4 June	(Czechoslovakia) Svítkov Stadium, Pardubice	(Czechoslovakia) Pavel Karnas	(Hungary) Jozsef Petrikovics	(Czechoslovakia) Roman Matoušek
3 June	(West Germany) Anton Treffer Stadion, Neustadt Donau	(West Germany) Karl Maier	(Hungary) Zoltan Hajdu	(West Germany) Gerd Riss

=== American Final ===
- 3 June, Top 4 to Overseas final plus 1 reserve
- (United States) Veterans Memorial Stadium, Long Beach

Pos.	Rider	Total
1	Sam Ermolenko	19+3
2	Shawn Moran	19+2
3	Ronnie Correy	19+1
4	Lance King	17
5	Rick Miller	16
6	Bobby Schwartz	14
7	Mike Faria	14
8	Gary Hicks	12
9	Bart Bast	12
10	Billy Hamill	10
11	Louis Kossuth	8
12	Greg Hancock	7
13	Ed Castro	7
14	Alan Christian	7
15	Steve Lucero	7
16	Brad Oxley	5
17	John Sizemore	3
18	Shawn Venables	1
19	Scotty Brown	1
20	John Kehoe	1

=== Commonwealth Final ===
- 4 June
- (England) Belle Vue Stadium, Manchester
- First 12 to Overseas final plus 1 reserve

Pos.	Rider	Total
1	(England) Simon Wigg	13
2	(New Zealand) Mitch Shirra	12+3
3	(England) Neil Collins	12+2
4	(England) Andy Grahame	9
5	(England) Kelvin Tatum	9
6	(England) Andy Smith	9
7	(England) Jeremy Doncaster	8
8	(Australia) Troy Butler	7
9	(England) Andy Phillips	7
10	(England) Martin Dugard	7
11	(Australia) Stephen Davies	7
12	(England) Andy Grahame	7
13	(England) Les Collins	6
14	(New Zealand) Gary Allan	5
15	(Australia) Glenn Doyle	0
16	(New Zealand) Darren Wilson*	0

*Darren Wilson replaced Larry Ross.

=== Swedish Final ===
- R1 (16 May, Nässjö Motorstadion, Nässjö)
- R2 (17 May, Nyköpings Motorstadion, Nyköping)
- R3 (18 May, Kalvholmen Motorstadion, Karlstad)
- First 6 to Nordic Final

Pos.	Rider	Scores	Total
1	Per Jonsson	13+15+14	42
2	Mikael Blixt	13+13+11	37
3	Jan Andersson	11+12+11	34
4	Jimmy Nilsen	14+11+8	33
5	Erik Stenlund	9+10+13	32
6	Tony Olsson	11+8+11	30
7	Niklas Karlsson	7+8+9	24
8	Peter Karlsson	8+9+5	22
9	Christer Rohlén	6+6+8	20
10	Conny Ivarsson	8+4+7	19
11	Dennis Löfqvist	5+7+3	15
12	Mikael Teurnberg	1+4+10	15
13	Mikael Ritterwall	6+1+3	10
14	Peter Nahlin	4+6+ns	10
15	Tommy Nilsson	3+5+0	8
16	Kenneth Lindby	ns+ns+5	5
17	Tommy Lindgren	1+1+ns	2

=== Norway Final ===
- (Norway) Vinsvollbanen, Drammen
- 30 August 1987, top 1 (+1 seeded) to Nordic final 1988

Pos.	Rider	Points
1	Lars Gunnestad	14+3
2	Tor Einar Hielm	14+2
3	Arnt Førland	11
4	Ingvar Skogland	10
5	Gjermund Aas	10
6	Willy Tjessem	8
7	Atle Knutsen	8
8	Arne Svendsen	8
9	Ronny Erga	6

=== Finland Final ===
- 28 August 1988, top 1 (+1 seeded) to Nordic Final 1989
- (Finland) Kotkan Motor Center, Karhula

Pos.	Rider	Heat Scores	Total
1	Kai Niemi	3,3,3,3,3	15
2	Ari Koponen	3,3,3,2,3	14
3	Vesa Ylinen	3,3,1,3,2	12+3
4	Petri Kokko	2,2,3,3,2	12+2
5	Aki Ala Riihimaki	2,3,3,2,1	11
6	Janne Moksunen	2,2,2,E,3	9
7	Jonko Jarvi	0,1,2,2,3	8
8	Roy Malminhelmo	3,2,2,X,1	8
9	Janne Koivula	1,1,1,1,2	6
10	Jari Moisio	2,0,0,3,F	5
11	Ossi Henriksson	1,1,2,1,0	5
12	Tomi Havu	0,F,0,2,2	4
13	Olli Turkia	1,2,0,1,-	4
14	Esa Reijo	1,1,1,E,1	4
15	Petri Hurmisniemi	0,0,1,0,-	1
16	Esa Einola	0,-,-,-,-	0
R1	Jarno Kosonen	1	1
R2	Jouni Ala Koskela	0	0
R3	Kaj Kujala	0,0,0	0
R4	Markku Haapala	X	0

=== Danish Final ===
- 19 May
- (Denmark) Speedway Center, Vojens
- First 6 to Nordic final

Pos.	Rider	Total
1	Erik Gundersen	14+3
2	Jan O. Pedersen	14+2
3	Brian Karger	14+1
4	Hans Nielsen	12
5	John Jørgensen	11
6	Peter Ravn	9
7	Allan Johansen	9
8	Ole Hansen	7+3
9	Kenneth Arnfred	7+2
10	Jan Stæchmann	6
11	Per Sorensen	5
12	John Eskildsen	3
13	Jan Jakobsen	3
14	Henrik Kristensen	3
15	Jens-Henry Nielsen	2
16	Jan Pedersen (Res)	1
17	Torben Hansen	0

== Fifth Round ==
=== Continental semi-finals ===
- 24 June
- (Poland) Rybnik Municipal Stadium, Rybnik
- Top 8 to Continental final

Pos.	Rider	Points
1	(Czechoslovakia) Zdeněk Tesař	14
2	(Hungary) Antal Kocso	12
3	(Soviet Union) Rif Saitgareev	11
4	(Poland) Roman Jankowski	10
5	(Czechoslovakia) Antonín Kasper, Jr.	10
6	(Poland) Ryszard Franczyszyn	10
7	(West Germany) Gerd Riss	9
8	(Czechoslovakia) Bohumil Brhel	10
9	(West Germany) Karl Maier	8
10	(Poland) Andreas Marynowski	7
11	(Hungary) Zoltan Hajdu	6
12	(Poland) Stanisław Urban	4
13	(Italy) Armando Dal Chiele	4
14	(Hungary) Sandor Ujhelyi	3
15	(Poland) Andrzej Huszcza	2
16	(Italy) Giorgio Zaramella	0

- 25 June
- (Soviet Union) Rivne Speedway Stadium, Rivne
- Top 8 to Continental final

Pos.	Rider	Points
1	(Czechoslovakia) Roman Matoušek	14
2	(Czechoslovakia) Petr Vandírek	12
3	(Poland) Ryszard Dołomisiewicz	11
4	(Soviet Union) Igor Dubinin	11
5	(Hungary) Zoltán Adorján	10
6	(Hungary) Sándor Tihanyi	9
7	(Italy) Armando Castagna	9
8	(Hungary) József Petrikovics	9
9	(Czechoslovakia) Pavel Karnas	8
10	(Soviet Union) Igor Zverev	6
11	(Poland) Wojciech Załuski	5
12	(Poland) Zbigniew Krakowski	5
13	(Hungary) Róbert Nagy	4
14	(Soviet Union) Vladimir Trofimov	4
15	(Czechoslovakia) Václav Milík Sr.	1
16	(Austria) Heinrich Schatzer	1

=== Nordic Final ===
- 4 June
- (Finland) Eteläpuisto, Tampere
- First 7 to Intercontinental final plus 1 reserve

Pos.	Rider	Total
1	(Denmark) Hans Nielsen	14+3
2	(Denmark) Jan O. Pedersen	14+2
3	(Denmark) Erik Gundersen	12
4	(Denmark) Peter Ravn	10
5	(Sweden) Tony Olsson	9
6	(Denmark) John Jørgensen	8+3
7	(Finland) Olli Tyrväinen	8+2
8	(Sweden) Erik Stenlund	8+1
9	(Sweden) Mikael Blixt	7
10	(Finland) Kai Niemi	7
11	(Norway) Lars Gunnestad	6
12	(Sweden) Per Jonsson	5
13	(Denmark) Brian Karger	5
14	(Sweden) Jimmy Nilsen	4
15	(Sweden) Peter Karlsson	2
16	(Norway) Arne Svendsen	1

=== Overseas Final ===
- 25 June
- (England) Brandon Stadium, Coventry
- First 9 to Intercontinental final plus 1 reserve

Pos.	Rider	Total
1	(United States) Sam Ermolenko	13
2	(England) Kelvin Tatum	12
3	(United States) Ronnie Correy	11+3
4	(England) Simon Wigg	11+2
5	(England) Andy Grahame	9
6	(New Zealand) Mitch Shirra	9
7	(England) Andy Grahame	8
8	(England) Jeremy Doncaster	8
9	(England) Andy Smith	8
10	(Australia) Troy Butler	6+3
11	(England) Martin Dugard	6+2
12	(United States) Lance King	5
13	(Australia) Stephen Davies	5
14	(United States) Rick Miller*	4
15	(England) Neil Collins	4
16	(England) Andy Phillips	1

* Rick Miller replaced Shawn Moran. Bobby Schwartz came in as the reserve rider

== Sixth Round ==
=== Continental Final ===
- 12 August
- (Hungary) Debrecen Speedway, Debrecen
- First 5 to World final plus 1 reserve

Pos.	Rider	Total
1	(Hungary) Zoltán Adorján	14
2	(West Germany) Karl Maier	10+
3	(Czechoslovakia) Roman Matoušek	10+
4	(West Germany) Gerd Riss	10+
5	(Czechoslovakia) Bohumil Brhel	10+
6	(Hungary) József Petrikovics	10+
7	(Soviet Union) Rif Saitgareev	10+
8	(Hungary) Antal Kocso	10+
9	(Czechoslovakia) Antonín Kasper, Jr.	8
10	(Hungary) Sándor Tihanyi	8
11	(Poland) Ryszard Dołomisiewicz	7
12	(Czechoslovakia) Zdeněk Tesař	4
13	(Soviet Union) Igor Zverev	3
14	(Poland) Wojciech Załuski (Res)	3
15	(Soviet Union) Igor Dubinin	2
16	(Czechoslovakia) Pavel Karnas	1
17	(Poland) Roman Jankowski	0

=== Intercontinental Final ===
- 13 August
- (England) Odsal Stadium, Bradford
- First 11 to World final plus 1 reserve

Pos.	Rider	Total
1	(England) Kelvin Tatum	13+3
2	(Denmark) Erik Gundersen	13+2
3	(Denmark) Hans Nielsen	12+3
4	(New Zealand) Mitch Shirra	12+2
5	(Denmark) Jan O. Pedersen	9
6	(England) Simon Wigg	9
7	(Sweden) Tony Olsson	8
8	(England) Jeremy Doncaster	7
9	(England) Andy Smith	6
10	(Finland) Olli Tyrväinen	5+3
11	(United States) Ronnie Correy	5+2
12	(Australia) Troy Butler*	5+1
13	(England) Andy Grahame	5+0
14	(Denmark) Peter Ravn	4
15	(England) Alan Grahame	3
16	(Denmark) John Jørgensen	3
R1	(England) Martin Dugard	1
R2	(Sweden) Erik Stenlund	0

*Troy Butler replaced the injured Sam Ermolenko. Martin Dugard came in as the reserve rider.

== World Final ==
- 2 September 1989
- (West Germany) Olympic Stadium, Munich
- Referee: ( (Netherlands) ) Henry van den Boomen

Pos.	Rider	Heat Scores	Total
1	(Denmark) Hans Nielsen	(3,3,3,3,3)	15
2	(England) Simon Wigg	(1,3,3,3,2)	12+3
3	(England) Jeremy Doncaster	(3,2,1,3,3)	12+2
4	(Denmark) Erik Gundersen	(2,3,R,3,3)	11
5	(England) Kelvin Tatum	(3,3,2,2,Fx)	10
6	(New Zealand) Mitch Shirra	(2,2,3,2,1)	10
7	(England) Andy Smith	(1,2,2,2,3)	10
8	(Sweden) Tony Olsson	(1,1,3,1,2)	8
9	(West Germany) Gerd Riss	(3,1,1,0,Fx)	5
10	(Czechoslovakia) Roman Matoušek	(0,2,0,1,2)	5
11	(West Germany) Karl Maier	(2,1,1,0,1)	5
12	(Australia) Troy Butler*	(2,0,2,0,0)	4
13	(Finland) Olli Tyrväinen	(0,0,2,0,2)	4
14	(United States) Ronnie Correy	(0,0,1,2,1)	4
15	(Hungary) Zoltán Adorján	(1,1,0,1,1)	4
16	(Czechoslovakia) Bohumil Brhel	(0,0,0,1,0)	1
R1	(England) Andy Grahame	did not ride	-
R2	(Hungary) József Petrikovics	did not ride	-

* Troy Butler replaced the injured Jan O. Pedersen. Andy Grahame came in as the reserve rider.

=== Classification ===
Placing	Rider	Total	1	2	3	4	5	6	7	8	9	10	11	12	13	14	15	16	17	18	19	20	Pts	Pos
1	(Denmark) (13) Hans Nielsen	15				3	3							3		3					3		15	1
2	(England) (6) Simon Wigg	12+3		1				3			3							3			2		12	2
3	(England) (1) Jeremy Doncaster	12+2	3				2				1				3				3				12	3
4	(Denmark) (16) Erik Gundersen	11				2				3	e						3			3			11	4
5	(England) (11) Kelvin Tatum	10			3				3		2					2						Fx	10	5
6	(New Zealand) (3) Mitch Shirra	10	2						2				3				2				1		10	6
7	(England) (4) Andy Smith	10	1							2				2				2				3	10	7
8	(Sweden) (15) Tony Olsson	8				1			1			3						1	2				8	8
9	(West Germany) (8) Gerd Riss	5		3						1			1			0			Fx				5	9
10	(Czechoslovakia) (14) Roman Matoušek	5				0		2					0		1							2	5	10
11	(West Germany) (5) Karl Maier	5		2			1					1					0					1	5	11
12	(Australia) (12) Troy Butler	4			2					0		2			0						0		4	12
13	(Finland) (9) Olli Tyrväinen	4			0		0						2					0		2			4	13
14	(United States) (7) Ronnie Correy	4		0					0					1	2					1			4	14
15	(Hungary) (10) Zoltán Adorján	4			1			1						0			1		1				4	15
16	(Czechoslovakia) (2) Bohumil Brhel	1	0					0				0				1				0			1	16
	(England) (17) Andy Grahame	0																					0	
	(Hungary) (18) József Petrikovics	0																					0	
Placing	Rider	Total	1	2	3	4	5	6	7	8	9	10	11	12	13	14	15	16	17	18	19	20	Pts	Pos

m - exclusion for exceeding two minute time allowance • t - exclusion for touching the tapes • x - other exclusion • e - retired or mechanical failure • f - fell • ns - non-starter • nc - non-classify

gate A - inside	gate B	gate C	gate D - outside
