= 1986 British Speedway Championship =

Seasons
- ← 1985 1987 →

The 1986 British Speedway Championship was the 26th edition of the British Speedway Championship. The Final took place on 1 June at Brandon in Coventry, England. The Championship was won by Neil Evitts, with Phil Collins in second place and Jeremy Doncaster winning a run-off for third.

== British Final ==
- 1 June 1986
- (England) Brandon Stadium, Coventry

Placing	Rider	Total	1	2	3	4	5	6	7	8	9	10	11	12	13	14	15	16	17	18	19	20	Pts	Pos	21	22
1	(England) (13) Neil Evitts	14				3	3							2		3					3		14	1		
2	(England) (2) Phil Collins	13	2					3				3				2				3			13	2		
3	(England) (15) Jeremy Doncaster	10				0			3			2						2	3				10	3		3
4	(England) (3) Marvyn Cox	10	1						1				3				3				2		10	4		2
5	(England) (9) Chris Morton	10			2		2						2					3		1			10	5		1
6	(England) (7) Malcolm Simmons	9		1					2					3	3					0			9	6		
7	(England) (10) Richard Knight	8			1			2						1			2		2				8	7	3	
8	(England) (1) Paul Thorp	8	3				1				3				T				1				8	8	2	
9	(England) (8) Kelvin Tatum	8		3						3			1			1			0				8	9	1	
10	(England) (16) Louis Carr	8				1				2	2						1			2			8	10	F	
11	(England) (14) Simon Wigg	7				2		E					0		2							3	7	11		
12	(England) (11) Andy Smith	5			3				0		0					F						2	5	12		
13	(England) (5) Andrew Silver	3		2			0					0					0					1	3	13		
14	(England) (6) Carl Blackbird	3		0				1			1							0			1		3	14		
15	(England) (4) Simon Cross	2	0							1				E				1				0	2	15		
16	(England) (12) John Davis	2			E					0		1			1						T		2	16		
R1	(England) (R1) Neil Middleditch	0																					0	R1		
R1	(England) (R1) Dave Clark	0													0								0	R1		
TR	(England) (TR) Mike Bacon	0																			0		0	TR		
Placing	Rider	Total	1	2	3	4	5	6	7	8	9	10	11	12	13	14	15	16	17	18	19	20	Pts	Pos	21	22

m - exclusion for exceeding two minute time allowance • t - exclusion for touching the tapes • x - other exclusion • e - retired or mechanical failure • f - fell • ns - non-starter • nc - non-classify

gate A - inside	gate B	gate C	gate D - outside

== British Under 21 final ==
Gary Havelock won the British Speedway Under 21 Championship. The final was held at Loomer Road Stadium on 17 May.

Pos.	Rider	Points
1	Gary Havelock	15
2	Andrew Silver	14
3	Darren Sumner	13
4	Michael Coles	9
5	Andy Galvin	8
6	Paul Whittaker	8
7	Gordon Whitaker	8
8	Mark Chessell	7
9	Alistair Stevens	7
10	David Biles	6
11	Richard Green	6
12	Paul Clarke	5
13	Ian M. Stead	4
14	Andy Phillips	4
15	David Smart	4
16	Jon Surman	1

== See also ==
- British Speedway Championship
- 1986 Individual Speedway World Championship
