= 1992 British League season =

British motorcycle speedway season

- League: British League
- No. of competitors: 13
- Champions: Reading Racers
- Knockout Cup: Bradford Dukes
- Gold Cup: Wolverhampton Wolves
- Individual: Joe Screen
- Highest average: Sam Ermolenko
- Division/s below: British League (Div 2)

The 1992 British League season was the 58th season of the top tier of speedway in the United Kingdom and the 28th known as the British League.

== Summary ==
Arena Essex gained promotion to the league from the 1991 season but Berwick dropped out of the league.

Reading Racers won the league for the second time in three years. Four riders who won the 1990 title (Jeremy Doncaster, Per Jonsson, Jan Andersson and Dave Mullett) were integral during the 1992 campaign. They were joined by Italian Armando Castagna and Ray Morton. Bradford Dukes retained their Knockout Cup title.

World Champion Jan O. Pedersen topped the averages for Cradley Heath.

== Final table ==
Pos	Team	PL	W	D	L	BP	Pts
1	Reading Racers	24	19	1	4	11	50
2	Bradford Dukes	24	15	0	9	18	38
3	Poole Pirates	24	15	2	7	6	38
4	Cradley Heath Heathens	24	14	2	8	8	38
5	Wolverhampton Wolves	24	14	1	9	9	38
6	Belle Vue Aces	24	14	1	9	8	37
7	Ipswich Witches	24	11	2	11	6	30
8	Coventry Bees	24	10	1	13	5	26
9	King's Lynn Stars	24	9	0	15	7	25
10	Oxford Cheetahs	24	8	4	12	4	24
11	Arena Essex Hammers	24	7	0	17	3	17
12	Eastbourne Eagles	24	6	2	16	1	15
13	Swindon Robins	24	5	2	17	2	14

M = Matches; W = Wins; D = Draws; L = Losses; Pts = Total Points

=== Fixtures and results ===
Home \ Away	AE	BV	BRA	COV	CH	EAS	IPS	KL	OX	PP	RR	SWI	WOL
Arena Essex		54–36	53–37	49–40	43–47	58–32	38–52	51–39	47–43	43–47	44–46	43–47	49–41
Belle Vue	63–27		48–41	55–35	55–35	54–36	52–38	56–33	51–39	53–36	43–47	54–36	46–44
Bradford	49–41	49–41		53–37	52–38	64–26	49–41	40–50	57–33	54–36	47–43	50–40	56–34
Coventry	55–35	40–50	35–55		40–50	48–41	51–39	48–42	38–48	44–46	45–45	50–40	56–34
Cradley Heath	59–31	52–38	40–50	46.5–43.5		48–41	51–39	57–33	50–40	39–51	42–47	51–38	50–40
Eastbourne	46–43	46–44	44–46	40–50	35–55		49–41	48–42	49–41	45–45	41–49	49–41	37–53
Ipswich	58–32	53–36	50–40	55–35	45–45	58–31		50–39	48–42	48–42	41–48	62–28	45–45
King's Lynn	49–41	36–54	53–37	49–41	40–50	48–42	51–38		51–39	49–41	0–75	49–40	40–50
Oxford	49–41	45–45	48–42	49–41	45–45	58–32	48–42	48–42		45–45	46–44	45–45	43–47
Poole	57–32	51–39	47–43	41–49	49–41	52–38	65–25	47–43	55–35		46–44	57–33	48–42
Reading	54–36	46–44	59–31	51–39	53–37	58–32	52–38	46–44	53–37	50–40		51–39	54–36
Swindon	53–37	43–47	41–49	43–47	46–44	45–45	42–48	46–44	46–44	43–47	40–50		40–50
Wolverhampton	50–40	49–40	49–41	41–49	44–46	49–40	54–36	51–39	47–43	51–38	56–34	49–41	

Legend: Blue = home team win; Yellow = draw; Red = away team win.

== British League Knockout Cup ==
The 1992 British League Knockout Cup was the 54th edition of the Knockout Cup for tier one teams. Bradford Dukes were the winners for the second successive year.

First round

Date	Team one	Score	Team two
10/07	Belle Vue	57-33	Coventry
06/07	Reading	56-34	Oxford
16/08	Kings Lynn	48-40	Ipswich
25/07	Coventry	51-39	Belle Vue
10/07	Oxford	45-45	Reading
03/06	Poole	49-41	Cradley Heath
04/06	Ipswich	56-33	Kings Lynn
25/04	Cradley Heath	54-36	Poole

Quarter-finals

Date	Team one	Score	Team two
24/07	Belle Vue	47-43	Ipswich
10/09	Ipswich	39-51	Belle Vue
29/07	Cradley Heath	56-34	Arena Essex
17/10	Arena Essex	49-41	Cradley Heath
24/07	Eastbourne	48-42	Bradford
10/10	Bradford	59-31	Eastbourne
26/10	Wolverhampton	50-40	Swindon
24/10	Swindon	43-47	Wolverhampton

Semi-finals

Date	Team one	Score	Team two
17/10	Bradford	61-29	Belle Vue
18/10	Belle Vue	54-35	Bradford
07/10	Reading	55-35	Cradley Heath
22/10	Cradley Heath	45-44	Reading

Final

First leg

24 October 1992

Bradford Dukes Gary Havelock 13 Simon Wigg 12 Antal Kocso 11 Kelvin Tatum 8 Sean Wilson 5 Paul Thorp 4 Stuart Parnaby 2	55 - 35	Reading Racers Per Jonsson 9 Armando Castagna 9 Dave Mullett 8 Jan Andersson 4 Jeremy Doncaster 3 Phil Morris 2 Lance Sealey 0

Second leg

26 October 1992

Reading Racers Dave Mullett 12 Per Jonsson 11 Armando Castagna 11 Jeremy Doncaster 8 Jan Andersson 7 Phil Morris 3 Lance Sealey 1	53 - 37	Bradford Dukes Gary Havelock 10 Simon Wigg 9 Kelvin Tatum 8 Paul Thorp 4 Stuart Parnaby 3 Antal Kocso 2 Sean Wilson 1

Bradford Dukes were declared Knockout Cup Champions, winning on aggregate 92-88.

== Gold Cup ==
North Group

Pos	Team	P	W	D	L	Pts
1	Wolverhampton	10	9	1	0	19
2	Oxford	10	5	0	5	10
3	Cradley Heath	10	4	0	6	8
4	Coventry	10	4	0	6	8
5	Bradford	10	4	0	6	8
6	Belle Vue	10	3	1	6	7

South Group

Pos	Team	P	W	D	L	Pts
1	Reading	12	10	0	2	20
2	King's Lynn	12	9	0	3	18
3	Ipswich	12	7	0	5	14
4	Arena Essex	12	6	0	6	12
5	Poole	12	5	0	7	10
6	Swindon	12	4	0	8	8
7	Eastbourne	12	1	0	11	2

Home \ Away	BV	BRA	COV	CH	OX	WOL
Belle Vue		56–34	50–40	39–50	49–41	43–47
Bradford	59–31		46–44	48–42	57–33	41–49
Coventry	48–42	50–40		48–42	44–46	42–48
Cradley Heath	58–32	50–40	42–48		50–40	42–47
Oxford	51–39	56–34	49–40	49–41		39–50
Wolverhampton	45–45	55–35	58–31	47–43	52–37	

Legend: Blue = home team win; Yellow = draw; Red = away team win.

Home \ Away	AE	EAS	IPS	KL	PP	RR	SWI
Arena Essex		56–34	47–43	56–34	62–28	44–46	53–37
Eastbourne	52–38		41–49	44–46	44–46	42–48	41–49
Ipswich	56–34	62–28		42–48	50–40	51–39	51–39
King's Lynn	46–44	54–36	42–48		51–39	48–42	47–43
Poole	53–37	58–32	46–44	42–48		43.5–46.5	48–42
Reading	52–38	51–39	47–43	53–36	48–42		48–42
Swindon	43–46	49–41	47–43	36–54	48–42	44–46	

Legend: Blue = home team win; Yellow = draw; Red = away team win.

Final

Team one	Team two	1st leg	2nd leg
Reading	Wolverhampton	47–42	41—49

Wolverhampton won 91–88 on aggregate.

== Riders' Championship ==
Joe Screen won the British League Riders' Championship. It was the held at Odsal Stadium on 3 October.

Pos.	Rider	Heat Scores	Total
1	(England) Joe Screen	3 3 2 3 3	14
2	(Sweden) Per Jonsson	2 1 2 3 3	11+4
3	(England) Gary Havelock	1 2 3 2 3	11+3
4	(England) Marvyn Cox	3 1 3 2 2	11+2
5	(Australia) Leigh Adams	3 2 0 3 3	11+1
6	(England) Simon Wigg	0 3 3 3 2	11+0
7	(Denmark) Hans Nielsen	2 3 3 TX 2	10
8	(Hungary) Róbert Nagy	1 0 2 2 2	7
9	(Denmark) Brian Karger	3 2 0 0 1	6
10	(United States) Sam Ermolenko	2 0 1 1 1	5
11	(Denmark) John Jørgensen	0 0 1 2 1	4
12	(Sweden) Henka Gustafsson	2 2 0 0 0	4
13	(United States) Greg Hancock	0 3 0 0 1	4
14	(Sweden) Peter Nahlin	1 1 1 1 0	4
15	(England) Martin Dugard	1 1 1 0 0	3
16	(Sweden) Tony Rickardsson	0 0 2 1 0	3
17	(England) Darren Pearson (res)	1	1

- ef=engine failure, f=fell, x=excluded r-retired

== Final leading averages ==
Rider	Team	Average
(United States) Sam Ermolenko	Wolverhampton	10.25
(Denmark) Hans Nielsen	Oxford	10.24
(Sweden) Per Jonsson	Reading	10.04
(England) Gary Havelock	Bradford	9.50
(Australia) Leigh Adams	Swindon	9.49
(United States) Greg Hancock	Cradley Heath	9.41
(United States) Ronnie Correy	Wolverhampton	9.36
(England) Marvyn Cox	Poole	9.26
(England) Joe Screen	Belle Vue	9.05
(England) Martin Dugard	Oxford	8.94

== Riders & final averages ==
Arena Essex

- (Denmark) Brian Karger 8.89
- (Denmark) Bo Petersen 8.18
- (Denmark) Peter Ravn 7.08
- (Denmark) Allan Johansen 6.94
- (England) Troy Pratt 6.10
- (United States) Josh Larsen 5.50
- (England) Andy Galvin 4.97
- (England) Alan Mogridge 3.11
- (England) Colin White 3.02
- (England) Robert Ledwith 0.44

Belle Vue

- (England) Joe Screen 9.05
- (United States) Shawn Moran 8.92
- (United States) Bobby Ott 8.83
- (Australia) Jason Lyons 6.84
- (Denmark) Frede Schött 6.12
- (England) Carl Stonehewer 5.95
- (England) Paul Smith 3.73

Bradford

- (England) Gary Havelock 9.50
- (England) Kelvin Tatum 8.75
- (England) Simon Wigg 8.25
- (England) Sean Wilson 7.55
- (England) Paul Thorp 6.70
- (Hungary) Antal Kocso 6.16
- (Scotland) Kevin Little 2.44
- (England) Stuart Parnaby 2.11
- (England) Darren Pearson 1.79
- (England) Stuart Swales 1.38

Coventry

- (Denmark) Tommy Knudsen 8.91
- (United States) Rick Miller 8.14
- (England) Andy Smith 7.64
- (Denmark) John Jørgensen 7.08
- (Denmark) Brian Andersen 6.24
- (England) Paul Bentley 5.49
- (England) Michael Warren 4.79
- (England) Jamie Habbin 3.87

Cradley Heath

- (Denmark) Jan O. Pedersen 11.37 (only 4 matches)
- (United States) Greg Hancock 9.41
- (United States) Billy Hamill 8.64
- (England) Simon Cross 7.91
- (Denmark) Gert Handberg 7.40
- (England) Andy Grahame 6.33
- (England) Andy Phillips 4.17
- (England) Scott Smith 3.79

Eastbourne

- (Sweden) Peter Nahlin 8.63
- (England) Andy Grahame 7.18
- (England) Andrew Silver 6.58
- (Finland) Olli Tyrväinen 5.84
- (Australia) Glenn Doyle 5.81
- (Sweden) Stefan Dannö 5.71
- (England) Nathan Simpson 5.57
- (England) Paul Dugard 4.75

Ipswich

- (Sweden) Tony Rickardsson 8.33
- (England) Chris Louis 7.46
- (Australia) Shane Parker 7.10
- (Czech Republic) Zdeněk Tesař 6.93
- (England) David Norris 6.76
- (Sweden) Tony Olsson 6.65
- (England) Ben Howe 4.86

King's Lynn

- (Sweden) Henka Gustaffson 8.86
- (England) Mark Loram 8.85
- (Sweden) Dennis Lofqvist 7.54
- (New Zealand) Gary Allan 6.50
- (Czech Republic) Bohumil Brhel 6.35
- (England) Alun Rossiter 5.28
- (England) Kevin Brice 5.24
- (England) Darren Spicer 2.34
- (England) Emmerson Fairweather 1.67

Oxford

- (Denmark) Hans Nielsen 10.24
- (England) Martin Dugard 8.94
- (England) Dean Barker 6.09
- (Denmark) Morten Andersen 5.22
- (Australia) Mark Carlson 5.21
- (Australia) Troy Butler 5.11
- (England) Glenn Cunningham 2.43
- (England) Darren Sumner 2.35

Poole

- (England) Marvyn Cox 9.26
- (Australia) Craig Boyce 8.56
- (England) Steve Schofield 7.97
- (England) Alun Rossiter 6.40
- (Denmark) Tom P. Knudsen 6.33
- (Sweden) Jorgen Johansson 5.63
- (England) Alastair Stevens 5.53
- (Australia) Tony Langdon 4.43

Reading

- (Sweden) Per Jonsson 10.04
- (England) Jeremy Doncaster 8.36
- (England) Dave Mullett 7.88
- (Sweden) Jan Andersson 7.65
- (Italy) Armando Castagna 7.09
- (England) Ray Morton 6.77
- (England) Phil Morris 2.89

Swindon

- (Australia) Leigh Adams 9.49
- (Sweden) Jimmy Nilsen 7.37
- (New Zealand) Mitch Shirra 7.16
- (United States) Kelly Moran 6.09
- (England) Dean Standing 5.75
- (England) David Smart 3.67
- (England) Steve Masters 2.88
- (England) Justin Elkins 2.73

Wolverhampton

- (United States) Sam Ermolenko 10.25
- (United States) Ronnie Correy 9.36
- (Sweden) Peter Karlsson 7.79
- (England) Graham Jones 6.83
- (United States) Charles Ermolenko 5.17
- (England) Gordon Kennett 4.17
- (England) Nigel Leaver 4.00
- (England) Stephen Morris 2.40

== See also ==
- List of United Kingdom Speedway League Champions
- Knockout Cup (speedway)
