= 1988 British Speedway Championship =

British Speedway Championship Of 1988

Seasons
- ← 1987 1989 →

The 1988 British Speedway Championship was the 28th edition of the British Speedway Championship. The Final took place on 2 May at Brandon in Coventry, England. The Championship was won by Simon Wigg, while Kelvin Tatum was second and Chris Morton beat Simon Cross in a run-off for third place.

== British Final ==
- 2 May 1988
- (England) Brandon Stadium, Coventry

Placing	Rider	Total	1	2	3	4	5	6	7	8	9	10	11	12	13	14	15	16	17	18	19	20	Pts	Pos	21	22
1	(England) (6) Simon Wigg	14		3				2			3							3			3		14	1		
2	(England) (14) Kelvin Tatum	13				3		3					2		2							3	13	2		
3	(England) (13) Chris Morton	11				2	2							3		3					1		11	3		3
4	(England) (3) Simon Cross	11	1						3				3				2				2		11	4		2
5	(England) (5) Neil Evitts	10		1			3					3					3					X	10	5		
6	(England) (12) Richard Knight	10			3					2		2			3						0		10	6		
7	(England) (16) John Davis	9				1				3	1						1			3			9	7		
8	(England) (2) Marvyn Cox	8	3					1				1				1				2			8	8		
9	(England) (1) Andy Smith	8	2				1				2				1				2				8	9		
10	(England) (8) Steve Schofield	6		0						E			1			2			3				6	10		
11	(England) (11) Andrew Silver	6			2				2		F					0						2	6	11		
12	(England) (7) Neil Collins	5		2					1					1	0					1			5	12		
13	(England) (4) Jeremy Doncaster	4	0							1				0				2				1	4	13		
14	(England) (10) Andy Galvin	3			1			F						2			0		0				3	14		
15	(England) (15) Sean Wilson	2				0			0			E						1	1				2	15		
16	(England) (9) Gary Havelock	0			F		-						-					-		-			0	16		
R1	(England) (R1) Andy Hackett	0					0											E					0	R1		
R2	(England) (R2) David Clarke	0											0							0			0	R2		
Placing	Rider	Total	1	2	3	4	5	6	7	8	9	10	11	12	13	14	15	16	17	18	19	20	Pts	Pos	21	22

m - exclusion for exceeding two minute time allowance • t - exclusion for touching the tapes • x - other exclusion • e - retired or mechanical failure • f - fell • ns - non-starter • nc - non-classify

gate A - inside	gate B	gate C	gate D - outside

== British Under 21 final ==
Mark Loram won the British Speedway Under 21 Championship. The final was held at Arlington Stadium, Hailsham on 12 June.

Pos.	Rider	Points
1	Mark Loram	15
2	Andy Phillips	14
3	Martin Dugard	13
4	Dean Standing	10
5	Chris Cobby	10
6	Alistair Stevens	10
7	Wayne Garratt	9
8	Paul Whittaker	7
9	Chris Louis	7
10	Kelvin Pitts	6
11	Rodney Payne	4
12	Gary Tagg	4
13	Darren Standing	4
14	Nathan Simpson	4
15	Adrian Stevens	3
16	Simon Wolstenholme	0

== See also ==
- British Speedway Championship
- 1988 Individual Speedway World Championship
