= 1986 Individual Speedway World Championship =

Motorcycle speedway world championship season

Seasons
- ← 1985 1987 →

The 1986 Individual Speedway World Championship was the 41st edition of the official World Championship to determine the world champion rider.

Hans Nielsen finally won his first world title after finishing in second place during the two previous Championships. He lost his first ride to arch rival and defending champion Erik Gundersen but then won his next four rides to be crowned the champion. Fellow Dane Jan O. Pedersen took silver and England's Kelvin Tatum took the bronze while Gundersen faded into tenth place.

It was the fourth final to be held at the Silesian Stadium in Poland.

== First round ==
=== British qualification ===
- Riders progress to British semi-finals

Date	Venue	Winner	2nd	3rd
Preliminary Round
9 April	Wimbledon Stadium, London	Dave Jessup	Andrew Silver	Roger Johns
13 April	Berrington Lough Stadium, Berwick	Paul Thorp	Rob Grant	Paul Stead
13 April	Boston Sports Stadium, Boston	Doug Wyer	Les Collins	Andy Hines
15 April	Wimborne Road, Poole	Steve Schofield	Neil Middleditch	Eric Monaghan
22 April	Milton Keynes Stadium, Milton Keynes	Malcolm Simmons	Barry Thomas	Andy Campbell
Quarter-Final
27 April	King's Lynn Stadium, King's Lynn	Andy Campbell	Steve Schofield	Les Collins

== Second round ==
=== British semi-finals ===
- 11 May
- (England) Abbey Stadium, Swindon
- Top 8 to British final

Pos.	Rider	Points
1	Alan Grahame	14
2	Phil Collins	10
3	Richard Knight	10
4	Kelvin Tatum	10
5	Malcolm Simmons	9
6	John Davis	9
7	Andrew Silver	9
8	Marvyn Cox	9
9	Peter Collins	
10	Andy Smith	
11	Neil Collins	
12	Peter Carr	
13	Sean Willmott	
14	Steve Schofield	
15	Martin Hagon	

- 18 May
- (England) Odsal Stadium, Bradford
- Top 8 to British final

Pos.	Rider	Points
1	Simon Wigg	14
2	Jeremy Doncaster	14
3	Neil Evitts	13
4	Chris Morton	11
5	Simon Cross	10
6	Paul Thorp	9
7	Kenny Carter	8
8	Carl Blackbird	8
9	Louis Carr	8
10	Les Collins	7
11	Andy Grahame	6
12	Kenny McKinna	5
13	Andy Campbell	3
14	Alan Mogridge	3
15	Andy Hines	1
16	Michael Lee	0

=== Swedish qualification ===
- Top 8 in heat 1, top 7 in heat 2 to Swedish final

(1 May, Gislaved Motorbana, Gislaved)
Pos	Rider	Points
1	Tommy Nilsson	15
2	Per Jonsson	`3
3	Patrik Karlsson	12
4	Conny Ivarsson	11
5	Dennis Löfqvist	10
6	Roland Dannö	10
7	Anders Kling	9
8	Tommy Lindgren	8
9	Patrik Åhlund	7
10	Mikael Löfqvist	5
11	Christer Jonsson	5
12	Jan Ericsson	4
13	Lars Hammarberg	3
14	Johan Zackrisson	3
15	Thomas Ek	3
16	Claes Ivarsson	2

(9 May, Kalvholmen Motorstadion, Karlstad)
Pos	Rider	Points
1	Tony Olsson	14
2	Jimmy Nilsen	13+3
3	Mikael Blixt	13+2
4	Kenneth Nyström	12
5	Christer Rohlén	9
6	Mikael Teurnberg	9
7	Uno Johansson	8+3
8	Lillebror Johansson	8+2
9	Pierre Brannefors	6
10	Hans Wahlström	6
11	Lars Andersson	5
12	Per-Ove Gudmundsson	5
13	Johan Staaf	5
14	Börje Ring	5
15	Mikael Messing	2
16	Kent Rickardsson	1
17	Hans Hallén	0

=== Australian qualification ===
Date	Venue	Winner	2nd	3rd
Queensland Championship
Dec 1985	Pioneer Park, Ayr	John Titman	Troy Butler	Steve Regeling
New South Wales Championship
Dec 1985	Newcastle Motordrome, Tomago	Stephen Davies	Chris Watson	?
Northern Territory Championship
Dec 1985	Arunga Park Speedway	Brent Nott	David Jackson	?
Victorian Championship
Dec 1985	Olympic Park, Mildura	Phil Crump	John McNeil	?
South Australian Championship
Dec 1985	North Arm Speedway, Adelaide	Steve Baker	Mark Fiora	?
Western Australian Championship
Dec 1985	Claremont Speedway, Perth	Mick McKeon	Glyn Taylor	David Cheshire

== Third round ==
=== Continental preliminary round ===
Date	Venue	Winner	2nd	3rd
Preliminary Round
11 May	(West Germany) Abensberger Stadion, Abensberg	(Czechoslovakia) Roman Matoušek	(West Germany) Heinz Huber	(West Germany) Erich Shafferer
11 May	(Bulgaria) Speedway Stadium, Targovishte	(Soviet Union) Valery Gordeev	(Italy) Armando Dal Chiele	(Czechoslovakia) Ladislav Hradecky
11 May	(Socialist Federal Republic of Yugoslavia) Ilirija Sports Park, Ljubljana	(Poland) Zenon Plech	(Soviet Union) Rinat Mardanshin	(Poland) Zbignew Blazejczak
11 May	(Hungary) Borsod Volán Stadion, Miskolc	(Czechoslovakia) Petr Kucera	(Italy) Gianni Famari	(Hungary) József Petrikovics

=== Australian Final ===
- Top 4 to Commonwealth Final plus 1 reserve

=== New Zealand Final ===
- 25 January 1986
- (New Zealand) Gisborne Speedway, Gisborne
- Top 3 to Commonwealth Final

Pos.	Rider	Total
1	David Bargh	14+3
2	Larry Ross	14+2
3	Mitch Shirra	12+3
4	Mike Fullerton	12+2
5	Kym Mauger	11
6	Chris Martin	9
7	Trevor Chapman	9
8	Craig Monk	7
9	Peter Nightingale	6
10	Spencer Timmo	5
11	Mike Hollows	5
12	Craig Blackett	4
13	Craig Wilkkie	4
14	Lee Chappell	3
15	Steve Brown	3
16	Jamie Martin	1

=== British Final ===
- 1 June 1986
- (England) Brandon Stadium, Coventry
- Top 9 to Commonwealth Final plus 1 reserve

Placing	Rider	Total	1	2	3	4	5	6	7	8	9	10	11	12	13	14	15	16	17	18	19	20	Pts	Pos	21	22
1	(England) (13) Neil Evitts	14				3	3							2		3					3		14	1		
2	(England) (2) Phil Collins	13	2					3				3				2				3			13	2		
3	(England) (15) Jeremy Doncaster	10				0			3			2						2	3				10	3		3
4	(England) (3) Marvyn Cox	10	1						1				3				3				2		10	4		2
5	(England) (9) Chris Morton	10			2		2						2					3		1			10	5		1
6	(England) (7) Malcolm Simmons	9		1					2					3	3					0			9	6		
7	(England) (10) Richard Knight	8			1			2						1			2		2				8	7	3	
8	(England) (1) Paul Thorp	8	3				1				3				T				1				8	8	2	
9	(England) (8) Kelvin Tatum	8		3						3			1			1			0				8	9	1	
10	(England) (16) Louis Carr	8				1				2	2						1			2			8	10	F	
11	(England) (14) Simon Wigg	7				2		E					0		2							3	7	11		
12	(England) (11) Andy Smith	5			3				0		0					F						2	5	12		
13	(England) (5) Andrew Silver	3		2			0					0					0					1	3	13		
14	(England) (6) Carl Blackbird	3		0				1			1							0			1		3	14		
15	(England) (4) Simon Cross	2	0							1				E				1				0	2	15		
16	(England) (12) John Davis	2			E					0		1			1						T		2	16		
R1	(England) (R1) Dave Clark	0													0								0	R1		
TR	(England) (TR) Mike Bacon	0																			0		0	TR		
Placing	Rider	Total	1	2	3	4	5	6	7	8	9	10	11	12	13	14	15	16	17	18	19	20	Pts	Pos	21	22

m - exclusion for exceeding two minute time allowance • t - exclusion for touching the tapes • x - other exclusion • e - retired or mechanical failure • f - fell • ns - non-starter • nc - non-classify

gate A - inside	gate B	gate C	gate D - outside

=== Danish Final ===
- 8 May 1986
- (Denmark) Hele Fyns Speedway Center, Fjelsted
- Top 5 to Nordic Final plus 1 reserve
- Tommy Knudsen seeded to Nordic Final

Pos.	Rider	Total
1	Hans Nielsen	14
2	Erik Gundersen	13+3
3	Bo Petersen	13+2
4	Jan O. Pedersen	12
5	John Jørgensen	12
6	Sam Nikolajsen	7
7	Per Sørensen	7
8	John Eskildsen	7
9	Jens Rasmussen	7
10	Peter Glanz	5
11	Tommy Knudsen	5
12	Peter Ravn	5
13	Fleming Pedersen	4
14	Kurt Hansen	4
15	Preben Eriksen	3
16	Aksel Jepsen	0

=== Norwegian Final ===
- (Norway) Elgane Speedway, Varhaug
- Top 1 (+1 seeded) to Nordic final

Pos.	Rider	Points
1	Ingvar Skogland	14
2	Robert Langeland	13
3	Arnt Førland	12
4	Per Magne Levang	11
5	Thor Gunnar Halvorsröd	9
6	Gjermund Aas	9

=== Finland Final ===
- (Finland) Varkaus Speedway Stadion, Varkaus
- 18 August 1985, top 2 (+1 seeded rider) to 1986 Nordic final

Pos.	Rider	Total
1	Ari Koponen	14
2	Juha Moksunen	13+3
3	Roy Malminheimo	13+2
4	Olli Tyrvainen	13+1
5	Pekka Hautamaki	12
6	Aki Ala Riihimaki	9
7	Janne Moksunen	8
8	Veijo Tuoriniemi	8
9	Ossi Henriksson	8
10	Heimo Kaikko	7
11	Esa Reijo	4
12	Aarre Soivuori	3
13	Marko Hyyrylainen	3
14	Mikael Back	2
15	Markku Haapala	2
16	Hannu Lehtonen	0

=== Swedish Finals ===
- SWE Top 4 to Nordic Final plus 1 reserve
- Jan Andersson seeded to Nordic Final
- R1 (21 May, Snälltorpet, Eskilstuna)
- R2 (22 May, Nässjö Motorstadion, Nässjö)
- R3 (23 May, Sannaheds Motorstadion, Kumla)

Pos.	Rider	R1	R2	R3	Tota
1	Tommy Nilsson	14	13	12	39
2	Jimmy Nilsen	10	13	11	34
3	Mikael Blixt	8	14	9	31
4	Erik Stenlund	9	11	10	30
5	Kenneth Nyström	11	6	11	28
6	Conny Ivarsson	10	9	8	27
7	Per Jonsson	5	13	8	26
8	Tony Olsson	6	10	8	24
9	Roland Dannö	11	5	8	24
10	Dennis Löfqvist	10	6	5	21
11	Christer Rohlén	6	4	9	19
12	Mikael Teurnberg	6	3	6	15
13	Uno Johansson	5	6	3	14
14	Tommy Lindgren	7	2	5	14
15	Patrik Karlsson	1	4	6	11
16	Anders Kling	0	1	0	1

== Fourth round ==
=== Continental quarter-finals ===
- Top 32 to Continental semi-finals

Date	Venue	Winner	2nd	3rd
24 May	(Poland) Polonia Bydgoszcz Stadium, Bydgoszcz	(Poland) Wojciech Żabiałowicz	(Poland) Grzegorz Dzikowski	(Soviet Union) Rif Saitgareev
25 May	(Czechoslovakia) Markéta Stadium, Prague	(Soviet Union) Viktor Kuznetsov	(Czechoslovakia) Antonín Kasper, Jr.	(Czechoslovakia) Petr Vandirek
26 May	(Netherlands) Olympic Stadium, Amsterdam	(Czechoslovakia) Roman Matoušek	(Poland) Roman Jankowski	(Italy) Armando Castagna
29 May	(West Germany) Olching Speedwaybahn, Olching	(Austria) Heinrich Schatzer	(Hungary) József Petrikovics	(Soviet Union) Mikhail Starostin

=== American Final ===
- 23 June 1986
- (United States) Veterans Memorial Stadium, Long Beach
- Top 5 + 1 reserve to the Overseas Final

Placing	Rider	Total	1	2	3	4	5	6	7	8	9	10	11	12	13	14	15	16	17	18	19	20	Pts	Pos	21	22
1	(United States) (12) Shawn Moran	14			3					3		3			3						2		14	1		
2	(United States) (10) Lance King	13			1			3						3			3		3				13	2	3	
3	(United States) (11) Sam Ermolenko	13			2				2		3					3						3	13	3	2	
4	(United States) (3) Bobby Schwartz	13	3						3				2				2				3		13	4	1	
5	(United States) (4) Kelly Moran	11	2							2				2				3				2	11	5		
6	(United States) (16) Rick Miller	9				2				1	2						1			3			9	6		
7	(United States) (1) Alan Christian	8	1				3				1				1				2				8	7		
8	(United States) (14) Keith Christo	8				1		2					3		2							0	8	8		
9	(United States) (5) Mike Faria	7		2			2					2					0					1	7	9		
10	(United States) (6) Steve Lucero	5		3				1			0							1			0		5	10		
11	(United States) (15) John Cook	6				3			0			0						2	1				6	11		
12	(United States) (7) Bobby Ott	3		0					1					0	0					2			3	12		
13	(United States) (13) Robert Pfetzing	3				0	0							1		2					0		3	13		
14	(United States) (2) Brad Oxley	2	0					0				1				1				0			2	14		
15	(United States) (8) Shawn McConnell	2		1						0			1			0			0				2	15		
16	(United States) (9) Ed Castro	2			0		1						0					0		1			2	16		
Placing	Rider	Total	1	2	3	4	5	6	7	8	9	10	11	12	13	14	15	16	17	18	19	20	Pts	Pos	21	22

m - exclusion for exceeding two minute time allowance • t - exclusion for touching the tapes • x - other exclusion • e - retired or mechanical failure • f - fell • ns - non-starter • nc - non-classify

gate A - inside	gate B	gate C	gate D - outside

=== Commonwealth Final ===
- 8 June 1986
- (England) Hyde Road, Manchester
- Top 11 to the Overseas Final plus 1 reserve

Placing	Rider	Total	1	2	3	4	5	6	7	8	9	10	11	12	13	14	15	16	17	18	19	20	Pts	Pos	21
1	(England) (16) Jeremy Doncaster	14				3				2	3						3			3			14	1	
2	(England) (15) Kelvin Tatum	12				2			3			3						1	3				12	2	
3	(England) (5) Chris Morton	11		2			3					1					2					3	11	3	
4	(Australia) (4) Steve Baker	9	1							1				3				3				1	9	4	
5	(England) (13) Neil Evitts	9				1	1							1		3					3		9	5	
6	(England) (8) Richard Knight	9		3						0			2			2			2				9	6	
7	(New Zealand) (14) Larry Ross	8				0		0					3		3							2	8	7	
8	(Australia) (6) Phil Crump	8		1				3			X							2			2		8	8	
9	(England) (2) Marvyn Cox	8	3					1				2				1				1			8	9	
10	(England) (9) Paul Thorp	8			3		2						1					0		2			8	10	
11	(New Zealand) (1) Mitch Shirra	7	2				0				2				2				1				7	11	
12	(New Zealand) (12) David Bargh	6			1					3		F			1						1		6	12	
13	(England) (10) Phil Collins	5			2			2						0			1		0				5	13	
14	(England) (7) Malcolm Simmons	3		0					1					2	0					0			3	14	
15	(Australia) (11) Steve Regeling	3			0				2		1					E						0	3	15	
16	(Australia) (3) Alan Rivett	0	0						0				0				E				0		0	16	
Placing	Rider	Total	1	2	3	4	5	6	7	8	9	10	11	12	13	14	15	16	17	18	19	20	Pts	Pos	21

m - exclusion for exceeding two minute time allowance • t - exclusion for touching the tapes • x - other exclusion • e - retired or mechanical failure • f - fell • ns - non-starter • nc - non-classify

gate A - inside	gate B	gate C	gate D - outside

== Fifth round ==
=== Continental semi-finals ===
- 8 June
- (West Germany) Ellermühle Stadium, Landshut
- Top 8 to Continental final

Pos.	Rider	Points
1	(Soviet Union) Viktor Kuznetsov	13
2	(West Germany) Georg Hack	12+3
3	(Soviet Union) Michail Starostin	12+2
4	(Czechoslovakia) Antonín Kasper Jr.	12+1
5	(West Germany) Karl Maier	11
6	(Austria) Heinrich Schatzer	10
7	(Czechoslovakia) Petr Vandírek	9
8	(West Germany) Klaus Lausch	8+3
9	(Hungary) Zoltán Adorján	8+2
10	(Czechoslovakia) Pavel Karnas	6
11	(Soviet Union) Vladimir Trofimov	6
12	(Hungary) Sandor Tihanyi	5
13	(Poland) Zenon Plech	4
14	(Poland) Andrzej Huszcza	3
15	(Poland) Zbigniew Blazejczak	1
16	(Hungary) József Petrikovics	0

- 8 June
- (Italy) Santa Marina Stadium, Lonigo
- Top 8 to Continental final

Pos.	Rider	Points
1	(Italy) Armando Castagna	12
2	(Czechoslovakia) Stanislav Urban	10+3
3	(Czechoslovakia) Roman Matoušek	10+2
4	(Soviet Union) Valerij Gordeev	10+1
5	(Poland) Wojciech Zabialowicz	10+0
6	(Poland) Ryszard Dolomisiewicz	9
7	(Poland) Maciej Jaworek	9
8	(Bulgaria) Nikolaj Manev	8
9	(Czechoslovakia) Lubomir Jedek	7
10	(Italy) Francesco Biginato	7
11	(Czechoslovakia) Zdeněk Schneiderwind	7
12	(Soviet Union) Rif Saitgareev	
13	(Poland) Ryszard Franczyszyn	
14	(Poland) Roman Jankowski	
15	(Italy) Paolo Salvatelli	
16	(Poland) Grzegorz Dzikowski	

=== Nordic Final ===
- 4 July 1986
- (Sweden) Kumla Motorstadion, Kumla
- Top 7 to Intercontinental Final plus 1 reserve

Pos.	Rider	Total
1	(Denmark) Hans Nielsen	14
2	(Sweden) Jimmy Nilsen	13
3	(Denmark) Jan O. Pedersen	11
4	(Denmark) Erik Gundersen	10
5	(Sweden) Jan Andersson	10
6	(Denmark) Tommy Knudsen	10
7	(Sweden) Tommy Nilsson	9
8	(Denmark) Bo Petersen	9
9	(Finland) Kai Niemi	9
10	(Denmark) John Jørgensen	8
11	(Sweden) Erik Stenlund	6
12	(Norway) Einar Kyllingstad	3
13	(Finland) Ari Koponen	3
14	(Sweden) Mikael Blixt	2
15	(Finland) Juha Moksunen	2
16	(Norway) Ingvar Skogland	0
Res	(Sweden) Kenneth Nyström	1

=== Overseas Final ===
- 19 June 1986
- (England) Brandon Stadium, Coventry
- Top 9 to Intercontinental Final plus 1 reserve

Placing	Rider	Total	1	2	3	4	5	6	7	8	9	10	11	12	13	14	15	16	17	18	19	20	Pts	Pos	21
1	(United States) (7) Sam Ermolenko	14		3					3					3	3					2			14	1	
2	(England) (4) Jeremy Doncaster	12	3							3				1				2				3	12	2	
3	(England) (14) Neil Evitts	11				3		2					3		2							1	11	3	
4	(England) (1) Marvyn Cox	10	1				3				3				1				2				10	4	
5	(England) (2) Chris Morton	10	2					3				2				2				1			10	5	
6	(New Zealand) (8) Mitch Shirra	9		0						2			1			3			3				9	6	
7	(England) (12) Kelvin Tatum	9			2					1		3			X						3		9	7	
8	(United States) (15) Kelly Moran	8				2			2			1						3	0				8	8	
9	(Australia) (5) Steve Baker	7		2			2					0					3					0	7	9	
10	(England) (13) Paul Thorp	6				1	1							2		1					1		6	10	
11	(Australia) (10) Phil Crump	5			3			1						0			F		1				5	11	
12	(United States) (11) Bobby Schwartz	5			1				0		2					0						2	5	12	
13	(New Zealand) (3) Larry Ross	5	0						1				2				E				2		5	13	
14	(England) (6) Malcolm Simmons	2		1				0			1							0			0		2	14	
15	(United States) (9) Lance King	1			0		0						0					1		0			1	15	
16	(United States) (16) Shawn Moran	0				F				-	-						-			-			0	16	
R1	(United States) (R1) Rick Miller	5								0							2			3			5	R1	
R2	(Australia) (R2) Steve Regeling	0									F												0	R2	
Placing	Rider	Total	1	2	3	4	5	6	7	8	9	10	11	12	13	14	15	16	17	18	19	20	Pts	Pos	21

m - exclusion for exceeding two minute time allowance • t - exclusion for touching the tapes • x - other exclusion • e - retired or mechanical failure • f - fell • ns - non-starter • nc - non-classify

gate A - inside	gate B	gate C	gate D - outside

== Sixth round ==
=== Continental Final ===
- 20 July 1986
- (Austria) Stadion Wiener Neustadt, Wiener Neustadt
- Top 4 to World Final plus 1 reserve
- Ryszard Dołomisiewicz seeded to World Final

Placing	Rider	Total	1	2	3	4	5	6	7	8	9	10	11	12	13	14	15	16	17	18	19	20	Pts	Pos	21	22
1	(Soviet Union) (7) Viktor Kuznetsov	13		3					2					3	3					2			13	1		3
2	(Czechoslovakia) (15) Antonín Kasper, Jr.	13				3			3			1						3	3				13	2		2
3	(Italy) (12) Armando Castagna	12			3					3		3			1						2		12	3		
4	(West Germany) (2) Karl Maier	11	1					3				2				2				3			11	4	3	
5	(Czechoslovakia) (11) Petr Vandirek	11			2				1		2					3						3	11	5	2	
6	(Poland) (6) Ryszard Dołomisiewicz	8		2				2			1							0			3		8	6		
7	(Czechoslovakia) (5) Stanislav Urban	7		1			3					0					3					0	7	7		
8	(Czechoslovakia) (8) Roman Matoušek	7		X						2			3			X			2				7	8		
9	(Soviet Union) (9) Valery Gordeev	7			1		1						2					2		1			7	9		
10	(Bulgaria) (3) Nikolai Manev	6	2						E				1				2				1		6	10		
11	(Poland) (13) Wojciech Żabiałowicz	6				2	2							1		1					0		6	11		
12	(West Germany) (16) Klaus Lausch	5				0				1	3						1			0			5	12		
13	(Soviet Union) (4) Mikhail Starostin	5	0							E				2				1				2	5	13		
14	(West Germany) (14) Georg Hack	4				1		E					0		2							1	4	14		
15	(Austria) (1) Heinrich Schatzer	3	3				F				-				-				-				3	15		
16	(Poland) (10) Maciej Jaworek	1			0			1						0			0		0				1	16		
R1	(Hungary) (R1) Zoltan Adorjan	0									0												0	R1		
R2	(Czechoslovakia) (R2) Lubomir Jedek	1													0				1				1	R2		
Placing	Rider	Total	1	2	3	4	5	6	7	8	9	10	11	12	13	14	15	16	17	18	19	20	Pts	Pos	21	22

m - exclusion for exceeding two minute time allowance • t - exclusion for touching the tapes • x - other exclusion • e - retired or mechanical failure • f - fell • ns - non-starter • nc - non-classify

gate A - inside	gate B	gate C	gate D - outside

=== Intercontinental Final ===
- 20 July 1986
- (England) Odsal Stadium, Bradford
- Top 11 to World Final plus 1 reserve

Placing	Rider	Total	1	2	3	4	5	6	7	8	9	10	11	12	13	14	15	16	17	18	19	20	Pts	Pos	21
1	(Denmark) (9) Erik Gundersen	15			3		3						3					3		3			15	1	
2	(Denmark) (14) Hans Nielsen	14				3		3					2		3							3	14	2	
3	(Denmark) (4) Tommy Knudsen	12	2							3				3				2				2	12	3	
4	(England) (5) Neil Evitts	11		3			1					3					3					1	11	4	
5	(England) (1) Kelvin Tatum	8	3				0				2				0				3				8	5	
6	(United States) (2) Sam Ermolenko	8	1					1				2				3				1			8	6	
7	(Sweden) (8) Jimmy Nilsen	8		2						2			1			2			1				8	7	
8	(New Zealand) (3) Mitch Shirra	7	0						3				0				2				2		7	8	
9	(England) (13) Chris Morton	7				0	2							1		1					3		7	9	
10	(Denmark) (6) Jan O. Pedersen	7		0				2			3							1			1		7	10	
11	(England) (15) Marvyn Cox	6				1			2			1						0	2				6	11	3
12	(Sweden) (7) Jan Andersson	6		1					0					2	1					2			6	12	2
13	(England) (12) Paul Thorp	4			1					1		E			2						0		4	13	
14	(England) (16) Jeremy Doncaster	3				2				0	0						1			0			3	14	
15	(Australia) (10) Steve Baker	2			2			X						0			0		0				2	15	
16	(Sweden) (11) Tommy Nilsson	1			0				1		0					0						0	1	16	
R1	(Australia) (R1) Phil Crump	0																					0	R1	
R2	(Denmark) (R2) John Jørgensen	0																					0	R2	
Placing	Rider	Total	1	2	3	4	5	6	7	8	9	10	11	12	13	14	15	16	17	18	19	20	Pts	Pos	21

m - exclusion for exceeding two minute time allowance • t - exclusion for touching the tapes • x - other exclusion • e - retired or mechanical failure • f - fell • ns - non-starter • nc - non-classify

gate A - inside	gate B	gate C	gate D - outside

== World Final ==
- 30 August 1986
- (Poland) Silesian Stadium, Chorzów

Placing	Rider	Total	1	2	3	4	5	6	7	8	9	10	11	12	13	14	15	16	17	18	19	20	Pts	Pos	21
1	(Denmark) (5) Hans Nielsen	14		2			3					3					3					3	14	1	
2	(Denmark) (11) Jan O. Pedersen	13			3				3		2					3						2	13	2	
3	(England) (12) Kelvin Tatum	12			2					2		2			3						3		12	3	
4	(Sweden) (1) Jimmy Nilsen	11	3				1				3				2				2				11	4	
5	(Denmark) (10) Tommy Knudsen	10			1			3						3			X		3				10	5	
6	(Soviet Union) (13) Viktor Kuznetsov	10				3	2							2		2					1		10	6	
7	(United States) (6) Sam Ermolenko	9		1				2			1							3			2		9	7	
8	(England) (4) Neil Evitts	8	2							3				1				1				1	8	8	
9	(England) (16) Chris Morton	8				2				1	0						2			3			8	9	
10	(Denmark) (8) Erik Gundersen	7		3						0			3			1			E				7	10	
11	(Poland) (15) Ryszard Dołomisiewicz	6				1			2			0						2	1				6	11	
12	(England) (14) Marvyn Cox	3				0		1					2		0							0	3	12	
13	(West Germany) (2) Karl Maier	3	0					0				1				0				2			3	13	
14	(Italy) (3) Armando Castagna	2	1						1				0				F				-		2	14	
15	(Czechoslovakia) (9) Antonín Kasper, Jr.	2			0		0						1					0		1			2	15	
16	(New Zealand) (7) Mitch Shirra	1		0					0					0	1					0			1	16	
R1	(Sweden) (R1) Jan Andersson	0																					0	R1	
R2	(Czechoslovakia) (R2) Petr Vandirek	1															1				0		1	R2	
Placing	Rider	Total	1	2	3	4	5	6	7	8	9	10	11	12	13	14	15	16	17	18	19	20	Pts	Pos	21

m - exclusion for exceeding two minute time allowance • t - exclusion for touching the tapes • x - other exclusion • e - retired or mechanical failure • f - fell • ns - non-starter • nc - non-classify

gate A - inside	gate B	gate C	gate D - outside
