= 1987 British Speedway Championship =

Seasons
- ← 1986 1988 →

The 1987 British Speedway Championship was the 27th edition of the British Speedway Championship. The Final took place on 31 May at Brandon in Coventry, England. The Championship was won by Kelvin Tatum, with 1986 champion Neil Evitts in second place and Simon Wigg in third.

== British Final ==
- 31 May 1987
- (England) Brandon Stadium, Coventry

Placing	Rider	Total	1	2	3	4	5	6	7	8	9	10	11	12	13	14	15	16	17	18	19	20	Pts	Pos	21	22
1	(England) (11) Kelvin Tatum	13			3				3		2					3						2	13	1		
2	(England) (2) Neil Evitts	11	3					1				2				2				3			11	2		
3	(England) (14) Simon Wigg	10				3		2					3		1							1	10	3		3
4	(England) (13) Marvyn Cox	10				2	2							2		1					3		10	4		2
5	(England) (12) Jeremy Doncaster	9			0					3		3			3						0		9	5		
6	(England) (5) Paul Thorp	9		F			3					X					3					3	9	6		
7	(England) (15) Andrew Silver	9				1			2			1						2	3				9	7		
8	(England) (6) Simon Cross	8		3				3			1							F			1		8	8		
9	(England) (3) Chris Morton	8	1						1				2				2				2		8	9		
10	(England) (4) John Davis	7	0							1				3				3				0	7	10		
11	(England) (1) Andy Grahame	6	2				0				3				0				1				6	11		
12	(England) (10) Gary Havelock	6			2			0						1			1		2				6	12		
13	(England) (8) Andy Smith	5		2						2			0			1			F				5	13		
14	(England) (7) Peter Carr	4		1					0					0	2					1			4	14		
15	(England) (9) Alun Rossiter	4			1		1						1					1		0			4	15		
16	(England) (16) Neil Collins	2				0				0	0						0			2			2	16		
R1	(England) (R1) Steve Collins	0																					0	R1		
R2	(England) (R2) Les Collins	0																					0	R2		
TR	(England) (TR) David Clarke	0										0											0	TR		
Placing	Rider	Total	1	2	3	4	5	6	7	8	9	10	11	12	13	14	15	16	17	18	19	20	Pts	Pos	21	22

m - exclusion for exceeding two minute time allowance • t - exclusion for touching the tapes • x - other exclusion • e - retired or mechanical failure • f - fell • ns - non-starter • nc - non-classify

gate A - inside	gate B	gate C	gate D - outside

== British Under 21 final ==
Darren Sumner won the British Speedway Under 21 Championship. The final was held at Loomer Road Stadium on 5 September.

Pos.	Rider	Points
1	Darren Sumner	14
2	David Biles	13
3	Mark Loram	12
4	Sean Wilson	11
5	Alistair Stevens	9
6	Chris Cobby	9
7	Ian M. Stead	8
8	Bobby Duncan	8
9	Peter McNamara	8
10	Andy Sumner	7
11	Scott Lamb	7
12	Adrian Stevens	6
13	Jon Surman	4
14	Will James	3
15	Lee Fathing	1
16	Steve Wicks	0

== See also ==
- British Speedway Championship
- 1987 Individual Speedway World Championship
