= 1990 British League season =

56th season of the top tier of British motorcycle speedway

- League: British League
- No. of competitors: 9
- Champions: Reading Racers
- Knockout Cup: Reading Racers
- Gold Cup: Bradford Dukes
- Individual: Hans Nielsen
- Highest average: Hans Nielsen
- Division/s below: 1990 National League

The 1990 British League season was the 56th season of the top tier of speedway in the United Kingdom and the 26th known as the British League.

== Summary ==
Reading Racers won the league for the first time since 1980. The domination of speedway in recent years by Oxford Cheetahs, Coventry Bees and Cradley Heathens had come to an end. The Reading team was an extremely strong all round squad, highlighted by the fact that Per Jonsson who finished third in the Reading averages would become World Champion by the end of the season. Veteran English international Jeremy Doncaster and their new Australian signing Todd Wiltshire topped the Reading averages and they were supported by fans favourite Jan Andersson, Dave Mullett and Tony Olsson. The team went on to complete the league and cup double after beating Bradford in the cup final. Hans Nielsen of Oxford topped the averages for an incredible eighth season running and also won the British League Riders' Championship for the third time.

== Final table ==
Pos	Team	PL	W	D	L	BP	Pts
1	Reading Racers	32	19	3	10	13	54
2	Wolverhampton Wolves	32	17	5	10	10	49
3	Belle Vue Aces	32	19	2	11	7	47
4	Oxford Cheetahs	32	17	2	13	10	46
5	Bradford Dukes	32	16	1	15	8	41
6	Swindon Robins	32	15	2	15	8	41
7	Cradley Heath Heathens	32	12	1	19	7	32
8	Coventry Bees	32	10	3	19	7	30
9	King's Lynn Stars	32	7	5	20	2	21

M = Matches; W = Wins; D = Draws; L = Losses; Pts = Total Points

== Fixtures and results ==
=== A fixtures ===
Home \ Away	BV	BRA	COV	CH	KL	OX	RR	SWI	WOL
Belle Vue		48–42	56–34	47–43	43–46	41–49	50–40	48–42	51–39
Bradford	58–32		44–46	47–43	57–33	46–44	53–37	49–41	69–21
Coventry	34–56	44–46		46–44	52–38	43–46	42–48	45–45	52–38
Cradley Heath	53–37	58–32	43–47		53–37	41–49	52–38	53–37	47–43
King's Lynn	45–45	52–38	45–45	48–42		45–45	46–44	44–46	45–45
Oxford	44–45	49–41	42–48	52–38	66–24		41–48	44–46	40–50
Reading	44–45	56–34	46–44	57–33	57–33	51–39		59–31	47–43
Swindon	55–35	50–40	64–26	46–44	59–31	57–31	40–50		57–33
Wolverhampton	53–36	53–37	49–41	47–43	51–39	48–42	45–45	49–41	

Legend: Blue = home team win; Yellow = draw; Red = away team win.

=== B fixtures ===
Home \ Away	BV	BRA	COV	CH	KL	OX	RR	SWI	WOL
Belle Vue		59–31	51–39	55–35	55–35	40–49	51–39	54–36	45–45
Bradford	59–31		47–41	50–40	46–43	57–33	49–41	58–32	45–45
Coventry	43–45	46–44		45–45	58–32	48–42	43–47	44–46	42–47
Cradley Heath	38–52	48–42	41–49		47–43	39–51	42.5–47.5	48–42	53–37
King's Lynn	43–47	42–48	50–40	47–43		43–47	61–29	35–55	43–47
Oxford	50–40	51–39	51–38	48–42	45–45		43–46	49–41	49–41
Reading	61–29	54–36	49–41	44–46	57–30	47–43		53–37	45–45
Swindon	42–48	46–44	54–36	38–52	59–31	43–47	45–45		57–33
Wolverhampton	52–37	48–42	46–44	54–36	49–41	44–46	48–42	58–32	

Legend: Blue = home team win; Yellow = draw; Red = away team win.

== British League Knockout Cup ==
The 1990 Speedway Star British League Knockout Cup was the 52nd edition of the Knockout Cup for tier one teams. Reading Racers were the winners.

First round

Date	Team one	Score	Team two
04/04	Coventry	45-45	Oxford
18/05	Oxford	44-46	Coventry

Quarter-finals

Date	Team one	Score	Team two
21/07	Coventry	37-53	Swindon
11/07	Cradley Heath	45-45	Bradford
14/07	Bradford	54-36	Cradley Heath
07/07	Swindon	56-34	Coventry
15/06	Belle Vue	61-29	Wolverhampton
21/05	Wolverhampton	34-56	Belle Vue
23/04	Reading	54-36	King's Lynn
21/04	King's Lynn	47-42	Reading

Semi-finals

Date	Team one	Score	Team two
20/09	Swindon	50-40	Bradford
13/09	Bradford	51-39	Swindon
27/07	Belle Vue	57-33	Reading
16/07	Reading	53-36	Belle Vue

Final

First leg

8 October 1990

Reading Racers Todd Wiltshire 15 Per Jonsson 12 Jan Andersson 6 Jeremy Doncaster 6 Armando Castagna 5 Dave Mullett 5 David Steen 2	51 - 39	Bradford Dukes Marvyn Cox 11 Gary Havelock 11 Glenn Doyle 10 Paul Thorp 3 Andy Smith 2 Neil Evitts 1 Bryan Larner 1

Smallmead

Second leg

13 October 1990

Bradford Dukes Gary Havelock 11 Marvyn Cox 9 Paul Thorp 7 Andy Smith 7 Neil Evitts 5 Bryan Larner 2 Stuart Parnaby 2 Glenn Doyle 0 (inj)	43 - 47	Reading Racers Todd Wiltshire 13 Dave Mullett 12 Jeremy Doncaster 6 Armando Castagna 6 Jan Andersson 5 Per Jonsson 4 David Steen 2

Odsal Stadium

Reading Racers were declared Knockout Cup Champions, winning on aggregate 98-82.

== Gold Cup ==
North Group

Pos	Team	P	W	D	L	Pts
1	Bradford	8	5	0	3	10
2	Cradley Heath	8	4	1	3	9
3	Wolverhampton	8	4	1	3	9
4	Belle Vue	8	3	0	5	6
5	Coventry	8	3	0	5	6

South Group

Pos	Team	P	W	D	L	Pts
1	Oxford	6	4	0	2	8
2	Reading	6	4	0	2	8
3	Swindon	6	3	0	3	6
4	King's Lynn	6	1	0	5	2

North Group

Home \ Away	BV	BRA	COV	CH	WOL
Belle Vue		48–42	46–44	44–43	42–48
Bradford	47–43		51–39	63–27	67–23
Coventry	46–44	46–44		40–50	53–37
Cradley Heath	52–38	41–49	52–38		55–35
Wolverhampton	47–43	61–29	47–43	45–45	

Legend: Blue = home team win; Yellow = draw; Red = away team win.

South Group

Home \ Away	KL	OX	RR	SWI
King's Lynn		39–51	44–46	47–43
Oxford	46–44		53–37	39–51
Reading	46–44	47–43		51–39
Swindon	51–39	38–51	47–42	

Legend: Blue = home team win; Yellow = draw; Red = away team win.

Final

Team one	Team two	Score
Oxford	Bradford	47–43, 27–63

== Riders' Championship ==
Hans Nielsen won the British League Riders' Championship for the third time. It was the held at Belle Vue Stadium on 14 October.

Pos.	Rider	Heat Scores	Total
1	(Denmark) Hans Nielsen	3 3 3 3 3	15
2	(United States) Kelly Moran	2 3 2 3 2	12+3
3	(United States) Ronnie Correy	3 2 3 2 2	12+2
4	(England) Marvyn Cox	1 3 3 2 3	12+1
5	(United States) Sam Ermolenko	0 3 2 3 3	11
6	(England) Andrew Silver	2 2 0 1 3	8
7	(Denmark) John Jørgensen	3 1 1 3 0	8
8	(England) Jeremy Doncaster	1 1 3 2 1	8
9	(United States) Shawn Moran	3 2 2 0 0	7
10	(England) Gary Havelock	2 1 1 1 2	7
11	(England) Mark Loram	2 1 1 1 1	6
12	(Australia) Todd Wiltshire	0 2 2 0 1	5
13	(Sweden) Jimmy Nilsen	1 0 0 0 2	3
14	(England) Kelvin Tatum	1 0 1 1 0	3
15	(United States) Bobby Ott	2	2
16	(United States) Greg Hancock	0 0 0 0 1	1
17	(England) Martin Dugard	0 0 0	0
18	(England) Richard Musson	0	0

- ef=engine failure, f=fell, x=excluded r-retired

== Final leading averages ==
Rider	Team	Average
(Denmark) Hans Nielsen	Oxford	10.36
(Denmark) Jan O. Pedersen	Cradley Heath	9.37
(England) Jeremy Doncaster	Reading	9.09
(England) Kelvin Tatum	Coventry	8.93
(United States) Sam Ermolenko	Wolverhampton	8.87
(United States) Ronnie Correy	Wolverhampton	8.85
(Australia) Todd Wiltshire	Reading	8.77
(England) Simon Cross	Cradley Heath	8.73
(England) Marvyn Cox	Bradford	8.63
(Sweden) Jimmy Nilsen	Swindon	8.57

== Riders & final averages ==
Belle Vue

- (United States) Kelly Moran 8.42
- (United States) Shawn Moran 8.00
- (United States) Bobby Ott 7.18
- (England) Chris Morton 7.01
- (England) Joe Screen 6.69
- (Denmark) Peter Ravn 5.76
- (England) Richard Musson 4.73
- (England) Max Schofield 3.08

Bradford

- (England) Marvyn Cox 8.63
- (England) Gary Havelock 8.50
- (England) Andy Smith 7.69
- (England) Paul Thorp 6.90
- (Australia) Glenn Doyle 6.16
- (England) Neil Evitts 6.13
- (England) Bryan Larner 2.02
- (England) Phil Disney 2.00

Coventry

- (England) Kelvin Tatum 8.93
- (Denmark) John Jørgensen 7.82
- (United States) Rick Miller 6.77
- (Czech Republic) Roman Matoušek 5.85
- (Denmark) Tommy Knudsen 5.74
- (England) Sean Wilson 5.55
- (England) Andy Hackett 5.33
- (England) Andy Phillips 2.86
- (England) Andy Meredith 1.95
- (England) Lee Coleman 0.67

Cradley Heath

- (Denmark) Jan O. Pedersen 9.37
- (England) Simon Cross 8.73
- (United States) Billy Hamill 6.80
- (England) Alan Grahame 6.21
- (Denmark) Gert Handberg 6.18
- (United States) Greg Hancock 5.51
- (England) Mark Robinson 2.48

King's Lynn

- (England) Mark Loram 7.77
- (England) Richard Knight 7.38
- (Sweden) Henka Gustaffson 7.09
- (United States) Gary Hicks 5.90
- (Sweden) Dennis Löfqvist 5.63
- (Australia) Stephen Davies 5.57
- (Czech Republic) Bohumil Brhel 5.33
- (England) Roger Horspool 0.89

Oxford

- (Denmark) Hans Nielsen 10.36
- (England) Martin Dugard 8.26
- (England) Simon Wigg 7.52
- (England) Dean Barker 5.81
- (England) Alastair Stevens 5.54
- (Australia) Troy Butler 5.05
- (England) Paul Dugard 3.47
- (England) John Bostin 1.84

Reading

- (England) Jeremy Doncaster 9.09
- (Australia) Todd Wiltshire 8.77
- (Sweden) Per Jonsson 8.39
- (Sweden) Jan Andersson 7.22
- (Italy) Armando Castagna 6.42
- (England) Dave Mullett 6.31
- (Sweden) Tony Olsson 6.25
- (New Zealand) Nathan Murray 2.51
- (Zimbabwe) Davd Steen 2.16

Swindon

- (Sweden) Jimmy Nilsen 8.57
- (Denmark) Brian Karger 7.91
- (England) Andrew Silver 7.53
- (Sweden) Peter Nahlin 7.31
- (England) John Davis 7.15
- (Australia) Leigh Adams 7.01
- (Australia) Phil Crump 5.67
- (England) David Smart 5.08

Wolverhampton

- (United States) Sam Ermolenko 8.87
- (United States) Ronnie Correy 8.85
- (England) Graham Jones 6.18
- (England) Neil Collins 5.70
- (Denmark) Jan Stæchmann 5.57
- (England) Carl Stonehewer 5.42
- (Sweden) Peter Karlsson 4.73
- (England) Wayne Carter 3.45

== See also ==
- List of United Kingdom Speedway League Champions
- Knockout Cup (speedway)
