= Kalvholmen Motorstadion =

Stadium in Karlstad, Sweden

- Location: Kalvholmsgatan, 652 21 Karlstad, Sweden
- Coordinates: 59°22′15″N 13°32′08″E
- Operator: motorcycle speedway
- Opened: 1970
- Length: 297 m (0.185 mi)

Kalvholmen Motorstadion is a motorcycle speedway track located in the southeast of Karlstad. The facility on the Kalvholmsgatan forms part of a complex that includes, speedway, Rally cross and Cross Kart.

The stadium hosts the Karlstad Speedway (Solkatterna) team that competes in the Swedish Speedway Team Championship.

== History ==
The track's origins started in the late 1960s, with a search by the motor club association for a new site, following the speedway team's move away from the short lived Färjestad's Trotting Track. The association found a landfill area and began construction in 1970 and opened it in the Autumn of the same year.

In 1979, a smaller 80cc track was constructed inside of the main 500cc track.

The venue hosted the World Championship Swedish final round during both the 1983 Individual Speedway World Championship and 1989 Individual Speedway World Championship and the final of the Swedish Individual Speedway Championship in 1984.

Tony Rickardsson, a multiple world champion set a track record of 56.3 seconds on 8 September 2004.

A dispute over ownership surfaced in late 2016, when Solkatterna and the Karlstad municipality disagreed as to who owns the site. Solkatterna claimed the land was owned by Karlstad's mechanical workshop (KMW) when the track was built and before the municipality bought the land, stating that the stadium was therefore still owned by the club. The municipality claimed that when they bought the land in 1970, they took responsibility for the stadium.
