= Nässjö Motorstadion =

Stadium in Nässjö, Sweden

- Location: Skogsvallen, 571 41 Nässjö, Sweden
- Coordinates: 57°38′13″N 14°40′51″E
- Operator: Nässjö SK motorcycle speedway
- Length: 0.290 km (0.180 mi)

Nässjö Motorstadion is a motorcycle speedway track in Nässjö, Sweden. The facility is located on the south west edge of the locality on Skogsvallen. The stadium hosts the NK Nässjö speedway team that has competed in the Swedish Speedway Team Championship and won the second division in 1997.

== History ==
The stadium has hosted many important events, including qualifying rounds of the Speedway World Championship in 1983, 1986, 1989 and 1991.

The track record of 57.8 seconds was set by Peter Ljung on 27 June 2018.

Since 2023, the venue has also run flat track racing (a form of speedway using bigger and heavier bikes).
