= Neville Tatum =

English speedway rider

- Born: 21 July 1965 (age 61); Epsom, Surrey, England
- Nationality: British (English)

Career history
- 1984–1985: Canterbury Crusaders
- 1986–1987, 1989–1991: Wimbledon Dons
- 1987–1988: Coventry Bees
- 1991, 1997: Ipswich Witches
- 1991–1992, 1996, 2003: Eastbourne Eagles
- 1992: Peterborough Panthers
- 1993: Arena Essex Hammers
- 1996: London Lions
- 1997: Oxford Cheetahs
- 1998, 1999: Isle of Wight Islanders
- 2000: Stoke Potters
- 2002: Somerset Rebels

Individual honours
- 1987: Scottish Open Champion
- 1997: British Championship finalist

Team honours
- 1987, 1988: British League winner

Neville John Tatum (born 21 July 1965) is a former speedway rider from England.

== Speedway career ==
Tatum rode in the top tiers of British Speedway from 1984 to 2003, riding for various clubs. Tatum rode at number 1 for Wimbledon Dons from 1986 to 1987 and spent a second period with the Dons from 1989 to 1991.

In 1996, Tatum was signed by Eastbourne Eagles for his second stint at Arlington Stadium.

Tatum reached the final of the British Speedway Championship in 1997. He

== Family ==
Tatum's brother is Kelvin Tatum. He is married to Elke Tatum and they have two children, Hannah and Phillip.
