= Darren Sumner =

British motorcycle speedway rider

Daz Sumner
- Born: 14 March 1968 (age 58); Stockport, England
- Nationality: British (English)

Career history
- 1985–1987: Stoke Potters
- 1987: Cradley Heathens
- 1988–1994: Middlesbrough Bears
- 1988, 1991: Belle Vue Aces
- 1992, 1994: Oxford Cheetahs

Individual honours
- 1987: British Under 21 Champion

Team honours
- 1994: Fours Championship winner

Darren Keith Sumner (born 14 March 1968 in Stockport, England) is a former motorcycle speedway rider from England. During his speedway career, he was known as Daz Sumner.

== Career ==
Sumner was the British Speedway Under 21 Champion in 1987.

Sumner rode in the National League for the Stoke Potters between 1985 and 1987 before being put on the transfer list despite winning the 1987 British Under 21 Championship. He made 104 league and cup appearances and scored 669 points during his career at Stoke.

Sumner went on to ride for Middlesbrough Bears from 1988 to 1994 and was signed by Belle Vue Aces for £12,000 in 1991.

Sumner rode for Oxford Cheetahs before retiring in 1994. During the final season of his career in 1994, he helped Oxford Cheetahs win the Fours Championship during the 1994 British League Division Two season.
