= Dean Standing =

British motorcycle speedway rider

- Born: 20 June 1969 (age 57); Southampton, England
- Nationality: British (English)

Career history

Great Britain
- 1985–1988, 1996: Eastbourne Eagles
- 1987: Wolverhampton Wolves
- 1988–1990: Ipswich Witches
- 1991–1992: Swindon Robins

Sweden
- 1992: Getingarna

Team honours
- 1986, 1987: National League Champion
- 1986, 1987: National League Knockout Cup Winner

Dean Michael Standing (born 20 June 1969) is an English former international motorcycle speedway rider. He earned four international caps for the England national speedway team.

== Biography ==
Standing, born in Southampton, began his British leagues career riding for Eastbourne Eagles during the 1985 National League season. He made extraordinary progress from one season to the next, rising from a 1.21 average to 7.06. The form helped contribute towards a league and cup double triumph in 1986.

The following year in 1987, Standing once again experienced a league and cup double success and also rode several times for Wolverhampton Wolves. After another solid season for Eastbourne in 1988, he signed for Ipswich Witches and gained individual recognition after reaching the finals of the 1989 and 1990 Speedway Under-21 World Championship.

Standing spent two seasons with Swindon Robins (1991 and 1992) before deciding to quit following a serious crash in September 1992, in which he suffered a broken collarbone and wrist injuries. He made a one-season comeback in 1996 for Eastbourne.

== Family ==
Standing's brother Darren was also a professional speedway rider.
