= Alan Mogridge =

English speedway rider

- Born: 6 November 1963 (age 63); London, England
- Nationality: British (English)

Career history
- 1981–1983: Wimbledon Dons
- 1982–1983: Crayford Kestrels
- 1984, 1986: Canterbury Crusaders
- 1984: Wolverhampton Wolves
- 1985–1988: Hackney Kestrels
- 1986: Rye House Rockets
- 1986, 1989–1990: Ipswich Witches
- 1988, 1994: Sheffield Tigers
- 1991–1992, 1995: Arena Essex Hammers
- 1993, 2006: Peterborough Panthers
- 1994: Middlesbrough Bears
- 1996: London Lions
- 1996–1997: Eastbourne Eagles
- 1999–2000: Berwick Bandits
- 2001: Swindon Robins
- 2002–2006: Stoke Potters
- 2006: Workington Comets

Individual honours
- 2001: British Championship finalist

Alan John Mogridge (born 6 November 1963) is a former speedway rider from England.

== Speedway career ==
Mogridge reached the final of the British Speedway Championship in 2001. He rode in the top tier of British Speedway from 1981 to 2006, riding for various clubs.

Mogridge became the captain of Arena Essex Hammers and after leaving them in 1992, he joined Peterborough Panthers.
