= Graham Jones (speedway rider) =

English speedway rider

- Born: 5 May 1963 (age 63); Oswestry, Shropshire, England
- Nationality: British (English)

Career history
- 1984–1988: Stoke Potters
- 1988–1993, 2003: Wolverhampton Wolves
- 1995–1996: Hull Vikings
- 2004: Glasgow Tigers

Individual honours
- 1989, 1990, 1992: British Championship finalist
- 1988: Pairs champion

Team honours
- 1991: British league winners

Graham Tudor Jones (born 5 May 1963) is a former international motorcycle speedway rider from England. He earned three international caps for the England national speedway team.

== Speedway career ==
Jones reached the final of the British Speedway Championship on three occasions in 1989, 1990 and 1992. He rode in the top tier of British Speedway from 1984 to 2004, riding for various clubs.

In 1988, Jones won the National League Pairs, partnering Steve Bastable for the Stoke Potters, during the 1988 National League season.

Jones was permanently signed by Wolverhampton Wolves from Stoke for a club record £15,000 in February 1989.
