= Alan Grahame =

British speedway rider (1954–2021)

- Born: 5 February 1954; Kingstanding, England
- Died: 3 October 2021 (aged 67); Worcester, England
- Nationality: English

Career history
- 1973–1977: Birmingham Brummies
- 1975, 1986: Swindon Robins
- 1975: Poole Pirates
- 1975: Wolverhampton Wolves
- 1975, 1995–1998: Hull Vikings
- 1978–1985, 1987–1991, 1993: Cradley Heathens
- 1992: Stoke Potters
- 1994: Oxford Cheetahs
- 1994: Peterborough Panthers

Individual honours
- 1984: Golden Hammer winner

Team honours
- 1974: British League Division Two Champion
- 1974: British League Division Two KO Cup Winner
- 1975: New National League Champion
- 1981, 1983: British League Champion
- 1979, 1980, 1982, 1983 1987, 1988, 1989: British League KO Cup Winner
- 1982, 1984: British League Cup
- 1980, 1983, 1984: Midland Cup
- 1994: Fours Championship winner

Alan William Grahame (5 February 1954 – 3 October 2021) was a British motorcycle speedway rider, who rode for the England national speedway team.

== Career ==
Grahame was born at Kingstanding, Birmingham, in February 1954 and made his British leagues debut riding for Birmingham Brummies during the 1973 British League Division Two season. He contributed towards the team when they won the league and cup double in 1974.

Grahame finished runner-up to his brother Andy Grahame in the 1982 British Speedway Championship, and qualified for the Speedway World Championship Final in 1984 as reserve and scored five points from two rides.

Grahame's most successful period was riding for Cradley Heath, where he won two league championships and seven Knockout Cups from 1978 to 1993.

In 1993, Grahame was signed by Oxford Cheetahs and during the final season of his career in 1994, he helped the Cheetahs win the Fours Championship during the 1994 British League Division Two season.

At retirement, Grahame had earned 42 international caps for the England national speedway team.

Grahame died at the age of 67 on 3 October 2021, from injuries sustained in a motocross racing crash at Bromyard Moto Parc the previous month.

== World Final Appearances ==
- 1984 – (Sweden) Gothenburg, Ullevi – Reserve – 5pts
