= Richard Knight (speedway rider) =

British speedway rider

- Born: 26 May 1959 (age 67); Cambridge, England
- Nationality: British (English)

Career history
- 1978–1983: Mildenhall Fen Tigers
- 1979, 1982, 1983: Wimbledon Dons
- 1983: Poole Pirates
- 1984–1986: Ipswich Witches
- 1987–1990 1993–1994: King's Lynn Stars
- 1991–1992: Berwick Bandits

Individual honours
- 1990: World finalist
- 1986, 1988, 1990 1991, 1993, 1994: British finalist
- 1983: National League Riders' runner-up

Team honours
- 1985: World Cup bronze
- 1984: British League Champion
- 1984: Knockout Cup Winner
- 1979: National League Champion

Richard John Knight (born 26 May 1959) is a former international motorcycle speedway rider, who represented the England team which finished third in the 1985 World Team Cup. He earned 20 international caps for the England national speedway team.

== Career ==
Knight, born in Cambridge, first rode in the British speedway leagues riding for Mildenhall Fen Tigers during the 1978 National League season. The following season, he remained with Mildenhall but also appeared for Wimbledon Dons in the highest league.

Knight significantly improved his average with Mildenhall and by 1983, his last season with the club, he was averaging 8.98. It was in 1984, that his career received a major boost when he was signed by Ipswich Witches. The Suffolk club were one of the leading clubs in the world at the time and he contributed to a league and cup double winning season.

Knight's career continued to blossom and he was selected by England to represent them in the 1985 Speedway World Team Cup, where they reached the final and won the bronze medal.

Knight joined King's Lynn Stars after the 1986 season and was the club's leading rider in 1987 and 1989. He also won the South African (Open) Championship in 1989. He would continue riding until the end of the 1994 season before he announced his retirement. He rode for Berwick Bandits from 1991 to 1992 and for King's Lynn again from 1993 to 1994.

In 2008, Knight returned to speedway to become Team Manager of Mildenhall Fen Tigers following the club's takeover in August of that year.

== World Final Appearances ==
=== Individual World Championship ===
- 1990 - (England) Bradford, Odsal Stadium - 10th - 7pts

=== World Team Cup ===
- 1985 – (United States) Long Beach, Veterans Memorial Stadium (with Jeremy Doncaster / Phil Collins / Kelvin Tatum / John Davis) – 3rd – 13pts (2)
