= Andy Phillips (speedway rider) =

English speedway rider

- Born: 10 October 1968 (age 58); Worcester, England
- Nationality: British (English)

Career history
- 1986–1989, 1991: Wolverhampton Wolves
- 1990: Coventry Bees
- 1992: Poole Pirates
- 1992: Cradley Heathens

Individual honours
- 1989: British Championship finalist

Andrew David Phillips (born 10 October 1968) is a former speedway rider from England.

== Speedway career ==
Phillips rode in the top tier of British Speedway from 1986 to 1992, riding for various clubs. In 1986, he started his career with Wolverhampton Wolves after being promoted from the junior ranks for the 1986 British League season. After four years with Wolverhampton, he signed for local rivals Coventry Bees on loan for the 1990 season.

Phillips reached the final of the British Speedway Championship in 1989.
