= Andy Grahame =

British motorcycle speedway rider

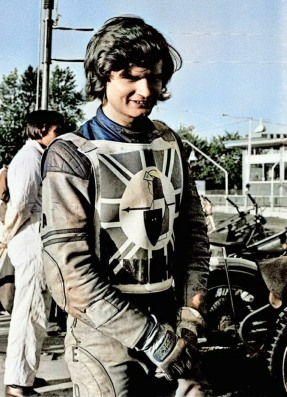
- Born: 10 September 1957 (age 69); Birmingham, England
- Nationality: British (English)

Career history
- 1976-1983: Birmingham Brummies
- 1978-1979: Milton Keynes Knights
- 1984, 1988: Wolverhampton Wolves
- 1985-1987, 1989, 1994: Oxford Cheetahs
- 1990: Wimbledon Dons
- 1991-1992: Eastbourne Eagles
- 1992-1994: Cradley Heathens

Individual honours
- 1982: British Champion
- 1990: National League Riders Champion

Team honours
- 1979: National League Best Pairs Champion
- 1985, 1986, 1989: British League Champion
- 1985, 1986 (shared): British League KO Cup winner
- 1986 (shared): British League Cup
- 1987: British League Pairs Champion
- 1985, 1986: Midland Cup

Andrew George Grahame (born 10 September 1957 in Birmingham, England) is a former motorcycle speedway rider. He earned 16 international caps for the England national speedway team.

== Career ==
Grahame began his British leagues career when he joined his older brother Alan Grahame at Birmingham Brummies for the 1976 British League season. Over the next three seasons he would only make a handful of appearances for the Midlands club so doubled up with Milton Keynes Knights in 1978, where he managed a 6.17 average. In 1979, he significantly improved his average for Birmingham and was the top rider at Milton Keynes. He also won the 1979 National League Pairs, partnering Bob Humphreys, during the 1979 National League season.

From 1980 to 1983, Grahame only rode for Birmingham and finished second in the team averages three seasons running behind Danish superstar Hans Nielsen. Grahame won the British Speedway Championship in 1982 and made it to the World Final in 1982 in Los Angeles as reserve but did not ride.

In 1984, Grahame rode for Wolverhampton before being signed by Oxford Cheetahs for the 1985 British League season. At Oxford he teamed up again with Hans Nielsen and the pair formed a formidable partnership at positions 1 and 2 in the team. He was part of the league and cup double winning team in both 1985 and 1986.

In 1987, Grahame teamed up with Nielsen to win the British League Pairs Championship, held at Smallmead Stadium. He spent a year at Wolverhampton in 1988 after signing fo £12,000 before returning to Oxford again for the 1989 British League season, where he won another league title.

In 1990, Grahame left Oxford to drop down a division and joined Wimbledon Dons. He won the National League Riders' Championship, held on 15 September 1990 at Brandon Stadium and also topped Wimbledon's averages.

Grahame would reach his seventh British final in 1993 and continued to ride until the end of 1994.

=== World Final Appearances ===
- 1982 - (United States) Los Angeles, Memorial Coliseum - Reserve - did not ride

== Brothers ==
Grahame's brother Alan also rode for the Oxford Cheetahs in 1993 and 1994 and both rode together for the Cradley Heathens in 2009. Another brother John Grahame also rode professional speedway.

== Popular culture ==
Grahame's image is depicted on Proof of Youth an album released in 2007 by the Brighton band The Go! Team.
