= Jeremy Doncaster =

British speedway rider

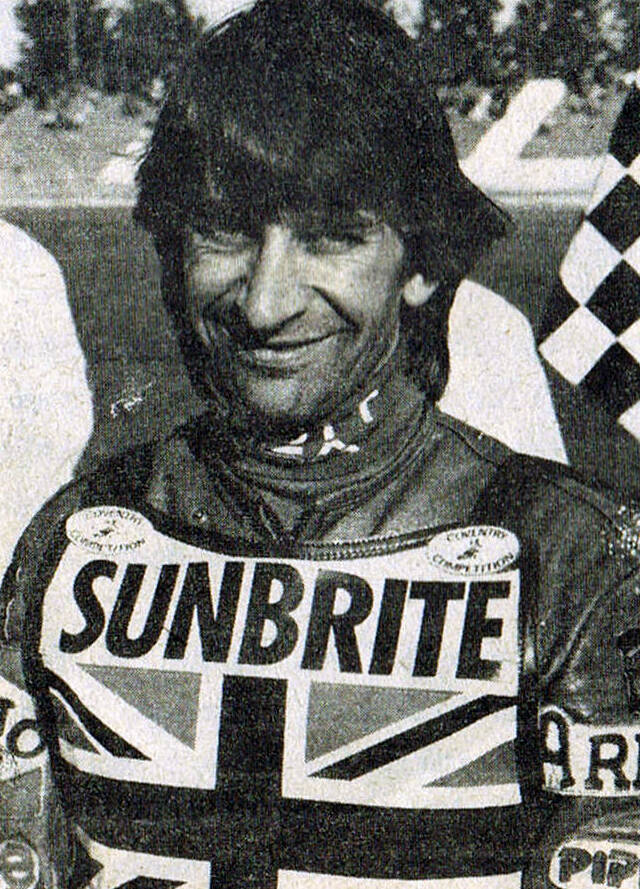
- Born: 16 June 1961 (age 65); Grimsby, England
- Nationality: British (English)

Career history

Great Britain
- 1982–1988, 1995–2002: Ipswich Witches
- 1989–1994: Reading Racers

Sweden
- 1995: Bysarna

Individual honours
- 1986, 1991: Commonwealth Champion

Team honours
- 1989: World Team Cup
- 1984, 1990, 1992: League champion
- 1984, 1990: KO Cup winner

Jeremy Doncaster (born 16 June 1961 in Grimsby, England) is a former international motorcycle speedway rider, who won the World Team Cup with England.

== Speedway career ==
Doncaster began riding for the Ipswich Witches during the 1982 British League season. He quickly built up his average and became a heat leader for the Suffolk club. He was instrumental in helping Ipswich seal the league and cup double during the 1984 British League season.

Doncaster's good form continued and by 1985 was considered one of the league's leading riders, during 1986 he recorded a 10.38 average. Ipswich dropped down to the second tier National League in 1988, resulting in Doncaster joining the Reading Racers, where he topped the team averages.

In 1989, Doncaster top scored for the England national speedway team with 13 points. He also finished in third place in the 1989 World Final. Doncaster finished equal on 12 points with countryman Simon Wigg who defeated him in a run-off for second place.

Doncaster also rode in the Swedish League for Bysarna. He had also twice won the Golden Helmet of Pardubice (CZE) in 1989 and 1990.

Doncaster experienced more success, this time with Reading, when the team won the league and cup double during the 1990 British League season and the league title during the 1992 British League season. In 1994, he rejoined Ipswich and despite being considered a veteran he continued to compete as a heat leader from 1994 to 1996. After 1997, his average had dropped to around the six mark and he took a break from conventional speedway to concentrate on longtrack. He returned to race for Ipswich for three more seasons from 2000 to 2002 and was considered an Ipswich legend when he retired.

At retirement, Doncaster had earned 52 international caps for England.

== World Final appearances ==
=== Individual World Championship ===
- 1987 – (Netherlands) Amsterdam, Olympic Stadium – 6th – 20pts
- 1989 – (Germany) Munich, Olympic Stadium – 3rd – 12pts + 2pts
- 1991 – (Sweden) Gothenburg, Ullevi – 15th – 2pts

=== World Pairs Championship ===
- 1986 - (West Germany) Pocking, Rottalstadion (with Simon Wigg) - 7th - 23pts (12)

=== World Team Cup ===
- 1985 – USA Long Beach, Veterans Memorial Stadium (with Phil Collins / Kelvin Tatum / Richard Knight / John Davis) – 3rd – 13pts (6)
- 1986 – (Sweden) Gothenburg, Ullevi, (Denmark) Vojens, Speedway Center and (England) Bradford, Odsal Stadium (with Simon Wigg / Neil Evitts / Kelvin Tatum / Chris Morton / Marvyn Cox) – 3rd – 81pts (10)
- 1987 – (Denmark) Fredericia, Fredericia Speedway, (England) Coventry, Brandon Stadium and (Czechoslovakia) Prague, Marketa Stadium (with Kelvin Tatum / Simon Wigg / Simon Cross / Marvyn Cox) – 2nd – 101pts (24)
- 1989 – (England) Bradford, Odsal Stadium (with Kelvin Tatum / Paul Thorp / Simon Wigg / Simon Cross) – Winner – 48pts (13)

== World Longtrack Championship ==
Finalist

- 1984 (West Germany) Herxheim 11th – 7pts
- 1985 (Denmark) Esbjerg 9th – 9pts
- 1995 (Germany) Scheeßel 11th – 9pts

Grand-Prix Years

- 1997 54pts – 10th (Five Rounds)
- 1999 42pts – 11th (Five Rounds)
- 2001 0pts – 21st (One Round)

== European Grasstrack Championship ==
- 1982 (Belgium) Damme Winner
- 1983 (West Germany) Nandlastadt 5th

== British Grasstrack Championship ==
500cc

- 1980 – Third
- 1988 – Third
- 1991 – Second
- 1992 – Third
- 1996 – Third

250cc

- 1979 – Second
- 1980 – First
