= Kelvin Tatum =

British motorcycle speedway rider

Kelvin Tatum MBE
- Born: 8 February 1964 (age 62); Epsom, Surrey, England
- Nationality: British (English)

Career history

Great Britain
- 1983–1984: Wimbledon Dons
- 1985–1990: Coventry Bees
- 1991: Berwick Bandits
- 1992–1993: Bradford Dukes
- 1994, 2002–2004: Arena Essex Hammers
- 1995, 1998: Poole Pirates
- 1996: London Lions
- 1997: Peterborough Panthers

Poland
- 1991–1992: Wrocław

Sweden
- 1989–1998: Örnarna
- 2000–2001: Indianerna

Individual honours
- 1987, 1990: British Champion
- 1987, 1988, 1990, 1992: Commonwealth Champion
- 1989: Intercontinental Champion
- 1991, 1997: Overseas Champion
- 1995, 1998, 2000: Long Track World Champion
- 1991, 1999: Australian Long track Grand Prix
- 1994, 1995: Ace of Aces Grasstrack Champion
- 1995: European Grasstrack Champion
- 1996, 1999, 2000, 2001 (shared): British Masters 500cc Solo Grasstrack Champion
- 1987, 1990: Pride of the East

Team honours
- 1989: World Team Cup Winner
- 1987, 1988, 1995: British League Champion
- 1992, 1993: British League KO Cup Winner
- 1992, 1993, 1994, 1996: Elitserien Champion
- 1985, 1987: British League Cup Winner

Kelvin Martin Tatum MBE (born 8 February 1964) is a former British international motorcycle speedway and grasstrack rider. He earned 65 international caps for the England national speedway team.

== Career ==
Tatum attended Brighton College from 1977 to 1980. He started riding speedway bikes at Hackney's training school at Hackney Wick Stadium in the winter of 1982-83. He was given his first team place at Hackney's London rivals, Wimbledon Dons, riding in the top flight British League in 1983. He finished the season with an average of over six points per meeting.

In 1985, Tatum signed for Coventry Bees from Wimbledon for £18,000, staying there for the next six seasons. While at Coventry, Tatum formed a formidable partnership with Tommy Knudsen, starring for the Bees and recording averages of 9.09, 8.69, 10.06, 10.04, 9.49 and 8.93 over the six seasons. He helped Coventry win back to back league titles during the 1987 British League season and 1988 British League seasons.

Stints then followed at Berwick Bandits, Bradford Dukes, Arena Essex Hammers, Poole Pirates, Peterborough Panthers and the ill-fated London Lions, with brother Neville Tatum among his teammates.

Tatum became British Champion twice; in 1987 and 1990. In 1989, he won the Intercontinental Final.

In 1990, Tatum was the highest placed British rider in the World Final at the Odsal Stadium in Bradford, finishing in seventh place with nine points from his five rides. In the 1990 World Final qualifying rounds, Tatum had won the Commonwealth Final at the Belle Vue Stadium in Manchester. It was his third Commonwealth Final win after having done so in 1987 and 1988. Tatum would add a fourth Commonwealth crown to his trophy cabinet in 1992.

== Longtrack and grasstrack ==
Later in his career, Tatum turned his attention to grasstrack and longtrack to much success. He won the World Long Track Championship three times, in 1995, 1998 and 2000, and missed out on a fourth title in 2004 when his bike broke down whilst leading the final. Tatum was also the European Grasstrack Champion in 1995 and British Grasstrack Champion four times: in 1996, 1999, 2000 and jointly in 2001, and was almost unbeatable in domestic grasstrack events in the latter stage of his career, winning four British Masters Championships. Fittingly, Tatum won his last grasstrack event, the Bonfire Burnup in 2006 at Collier Street in Kent.

Tatum also won the Australian Long track Grand Prix in 1991 at the 800 metres (870 yards) Bathurst Showground, and again in 1999 at the Tamworth Showground.

== After retirement ==
Tatum coached the Lakeside Hammers in 2016 before becoming a television presenter, appearing on BT Sport speedway programmes as a presenter and commentator and is currently the lead expert commentator for Speedway Grand Prix and Speedway World Cup broadcasts. He began commentating when taking a break from the sport, but continued when he returned to ride for the Arena Essex Hammers in 2002. He was appointed a Member of the Order of the British Empire (MBE) in the 2003 New Year Honours for services to speedway.

== World Final appearances ==
=== Individual World Championship ===
- 1985 - (England) Bradford, Odsal Stadium - 8th - 8pts
- 1986 - (Poland) Chorzów, Silesian Stadium - 3rd - 12pts
- 1988 - (Denmark) Vojens, Speedway Center - 8th - 8pts
- 1989 - (West Germany) Munich, Olympic Stadium - 5th - 10pts
- 1990 - (England) Bradford, Odsal Stadium - 7th - 9pts
- 1991 - (Sweden) Gothenburg, Ullevi - 8th - 8pts
- 1992 - (Poland) Wrocław, Olympic Stadium - 10th - 6pts

=== World Pairs Championship ===
- 1985 - (Poland) Rybnik, Rybnik Municipal Stadium (with Kenny Carter) - 2nd - 27pts (13)
- 1987 - (Czechoslovakia) Pardubice, Svítkov Stadion (with Simon Wigg) - 2nd - 44pts (24)
- 1988 - (England) Bradford, Odsal Stadium (with Simon Cross) - 2nd - 41pts (21)
- 1989 - (Poland) Leszno, Alfred Smoczyk Stadium (with Paul Thorp) - 3rd - 37pts (21)
- 1990 - (West Germany) Landshut, Ellermühle Stadium (with Simon Cross) - 8th - 20pts (20)
- 1992 - (Italy) Lonigo, Pista Speedway (with Gary Havelock / Martin Dugard) - 2nd - 23+2pts (8)

=== World Team Cup ===
- 1985 - USA Long Beach, Veterans Memorial Stadium (with Jeremy Doncaster / Phil Collins / Richard Knight / John Davis) – 3rd – 13pts (3)
- 1986 - (Sweden) Göteborg, Ullevi, (Denmark) Vojens, Speedway Center and (England) Bradford, Odsal Stadium (with Simon Wigg / Neil Evitts / Jeremy Doncaster / Chris Morton / Marvyn Cox) - 3rd - 81pts (19)
- 1987 - (Denmark) Fredericia, Fredericia Speedway, (England) Coventry, Brandon Stadium and (Czech Republic) Prague, Markéta Stadium (with Simon Wigg / Jeremy Doncaster / Simon Cross / Marvyn Cox) - 2nd - 101pts (25)
- 1988 - (United States) Long Beach, Veterans Memorial Stadium (with Simon Wigg / Simon Cross / Chris Morton / Gary Havelock) - 4th - 22pts (7)
- 1989 - (England) Bradford, Odsal Stadium (with Jeremy Doncaster / Paul Thorp / Simon Wigg / Simon Cross) - Winner - 48pts (12)
- 1990 - (Czechoslovakia) Pardubice, Svítkov Stadion - 2nd - 34pts (11)
- 1992 - (Sweden) Kumla, Kumla Speedway - 3rd - 31pts (3)
- 1993 - (England) Coventry, Brandon Stadium - 4th - 14pts (2)

== British Speedway Championship ==
Finals

- 1985 @ Brandon Stadium (4th) 12pts
- 1986 @ Brandon Stadium (6th) 8pts
- 1987 @ Brandon Stadium (Champion) 13pts
- 1988 @ Brandon Stadium (Runner-up) 13pts
- 1989 @ Brandon Stadium (Runner-up) 12pts
- 1990 @ Brandon Stadium (Champion) 13pts
- 1991 @ Brandon Stadium (Runner-up) 13pts
- 1992 @ Brandon Stadium (5th) 10pts
- 1994 @ Brandon Stadium (11th) 6pts
- 1996 @ Brandon Stadium (4th) 10pts
- 1997 @ Brandon Stadium (8th) 8pts
- 1998 @ Brandon Stadium (6th) 9pts

== World Longtrack Championship ==
Finals

- 1994 - (Czech Republic) Mariánské Lázně (11th) 9pts
- 1995 - (Germany) Scheeßel (Champion) 20pts * Note Tatum beat Simon Wigg in a run-off for the championship
- 1996 - (Germany) Herxheim bei Landau/Pfalz (5th) 14pts

Grand-Prix

- 1998 - 5 apps (Champion) 104pts
- 1999 - 5 apps (Third) 79pts
- 2000 - 5 apps (Champion) 102pts
- 2001 - 4 apps (Second) 76pts
- 2002 - 5 apps (Second) 96pts
- 2003 - 6 apps (Second) 120pts
- 2004 - 5 apps (Second) 101pts
- 2005 - 2 apps (11th) 34pts

World Longtrack Best Grand-Prix Results

- (England) - Abingdon-on-Thames First 1998
- (Netherlands) - Aduard First 1998
- (Germany) - Berghaupten Third 1999
- (Germany) - Bielefeld First 2002, Second 2003
- (France) - Saint-Colomb-de-Lauzun Second 2002
- (Netherlands) - Eenrum First 1999, 2000
- (Germany) - Harsewinkel First 2000
- (Germany) - Jübek First 2000, Second 1999
- (France) - Marmande First 2003, 2004
- (Germany) - Morizès First 2001, 2004, Second 2000, 2002, Third 2003
- (New Zealand) - New Plymouth First 2003
- (England) - Tonbridge First 2003, Third 2001
- (Germany) - Pfarrkirchen First 2004
- (Germany) - Parchim Second 2001, 2005
- (Germany) - Scheeßel First 1998, Second 2002

== European Grasstrack Championship ==
Finals

- 1995 (Netherlands) - Joure (Champion) 24pts
- 2004 (Netherlands) - Eenrum (Did not start)

== British Masters Grasstrack Championship ==
Podium Finishes

- 1993 Third @ Tonbridge & Wimborne
- 1994 Third @ Severn Valley & Tonbridge
- 1995 Second @ North Berks & Severn Valley
- 1996 First @ Andover & North Berks
- 1997 Second @ Wainfleet & Andover
- 1999 First @ North Berks
- 2000 First @ Astra
- 2001 Equal First @ North Berks
- 2003 Third @ Astra
