= Neil Evitts =

British motorcycle speedway rider

- Born: 25 September 1964 (age 62); Birmingham, England
- Nationality: British (English)

Career history
- 1980: Stoke Potters
- 1980, 1981-1983: Birmingham Brummies
- 1981, 1993: Wolverhampton Wolves
- 1984-1985: Halifax Dukes
- 1986-1990: Bradford Dukes
- 1991-1992: Sheffield Tigers

Individual honours
- 1986: British Champion

Team honours
- 1991, 1992, 1993: British League KO Cup Winner

Neil Clive Evitts (born 25 September 1964 in Birmingham, England) is a former English international motorcycle speedway rider. He was the 1986 British champion and earned 27 international caps for the England national speedway team.

== Career ==
Evitts began his British leagues career riding for Stoke Potters during the 1980 National League season. In 1981, he doubled up riding for Birmingham Brummies in the British League and Wolverhampton Wolves in the National League. By the end of 1983, he had improved his average to 6.88 and moved on to join the Halifax Dukes.

In 1986, Halifax became Bradford and Evitts recorded a 9.32 season average in 1986. It was also during 1986 that he experienced individual success becoming the champion of Britain after winning the British Speedway Championship. His win surprised many defeating the likes of Jeremy Doncaster, Chris Morton and Simon Wigg but he proved that it was no fluke by qualifying for the 1986 Individual Speedway World Championship final, where he finished in eighth place.

In 1987, Evitts finished runner-up in the British Championship and became the captain of the England speedway team. On the domestic front, he continued to ride for Bradford until 1991, when he joined the Sheffield Tigers for the 1991 British League Division Two season.

Evitts finished his career in 1995 after riding a few times for Belle Vue Aces. He had been troubled by a persistent a knee injury.

== World final appearances ==
=== Individual World Championship ===
- 1986 – (Poland) Chorzów, Silesian Stadium – 8th – 8pts

=== World Team Cup ===
- 1986 - (Sweden) Gothenburg, Ullevi and (Denmark) Vojens, Speedway Center (with Simon Wigg / Kelvin Tatum / Jeremy Doncaster / Chris Morton) – 3rd – 81pts (8)
