= John Davis (speedway rider) =

British motorcycle speedway rider

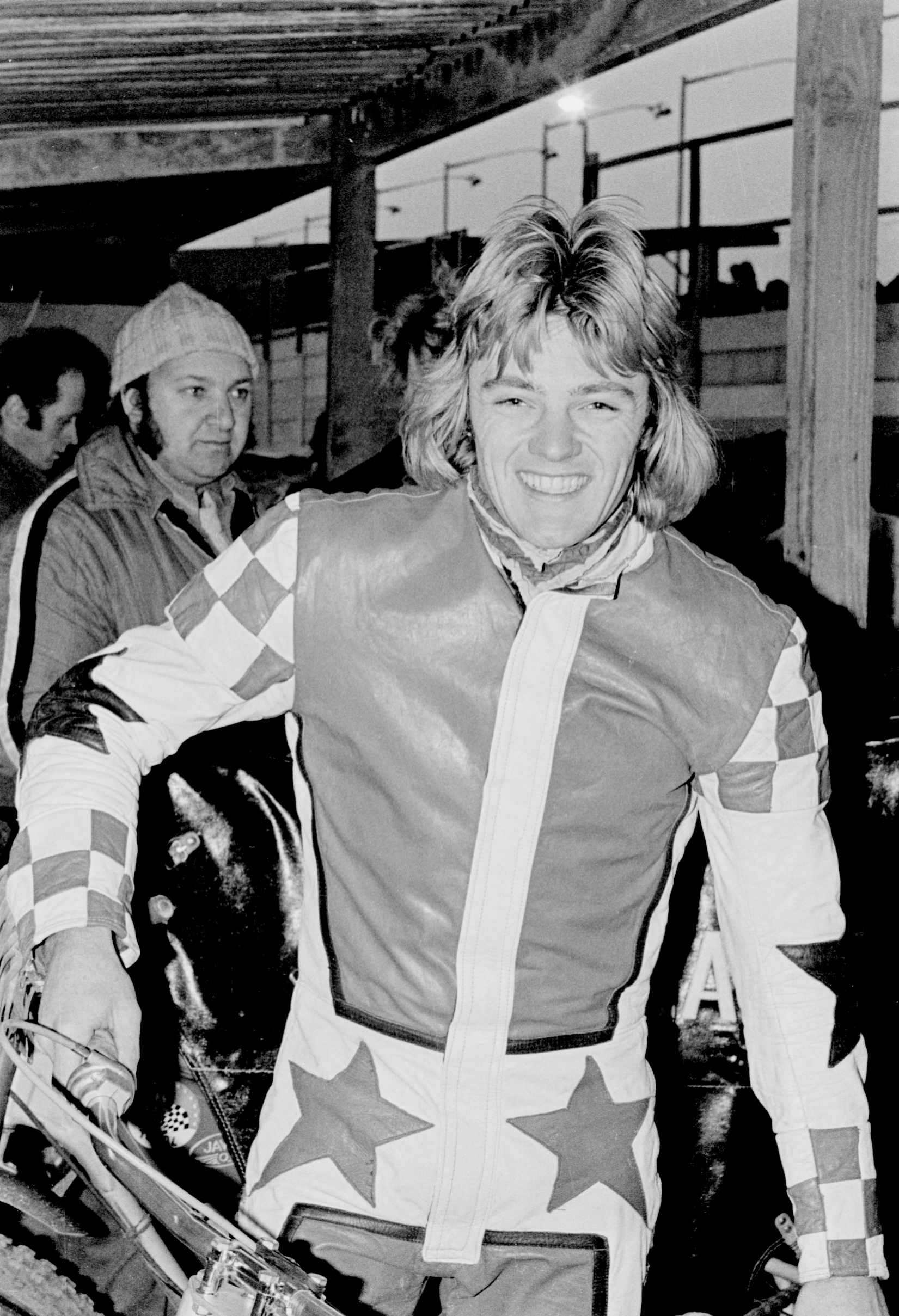
- Born: 10 November 1954 (age 72); Oxford, England
- Nationality: British (English)

Career history

Great Britain
- 1971-1973: Peterborough Panthers
- 1971, 1981-1983: Poole Pirates
- 1971: West Ham Hammers
- 1971-1974: Oxford Cheetahs/Rebels
- 1972: Exeter Falcons
- 1975-1981, 1985-1987: Reading Racers
- 1983: Sheffield Tigers
- 1984, 1991: Wimbledon Dons
- 1988-1989: Kings Lynn Stars
- 1989-1991: Swindon Robins
- 1991: Eastbourne Eagles

Sweden
- 1989-1990: Dackarna

Poland
- 1991: Gdańsk

Individual honours
- 1984: Golden Helmet of Pardubice
- 1978, 1981: The Laurels
- 1980: Spring Classic

Team honours
- 1977: World Team Cup Winner
- 1980: British League champion
- 1977: Spring Gold Cup Winner

John Henry Davis (born 10 November 1954 in Oxford, England) is a former international motorcycle speedway rider who represented England, when they won the World Team Cup in 1977 and 1980.

== Career ==
Davis was capped for the England national speedway team 68 times, and was the first Englishman to win the prestigious Czech Golden Helmet of Pardubice. He also raced in the Swedish and Polish Leagues for Dackarna and Wybrzeże Gdańsk. He raced for Diedenbergen in the German League for ten seasons, winning four German titles, where he was consistently the top performer. He qualified for 16 consecutive British Final appearances, his best finish being second to the late Kenny Carter; this was when England ruled The Speedway World.

Davis started his career with Peterborough Panthers, during the 1971 British League Division Two season and improved over the next two seasons to the extent that he became a regular for his home city club, the Oxford Rebels.

In 1975, Davis left Oxford after being caught up in the wrangle over whether Ole Olsen would ride for Oxford, and was in the strange position of guesting for himself in a couple of matches at the start of the season. Eventually, the Speedway Control Board ruled that Olsen would stay with Wolverhampton Wolves and Dag Lovaas would ride at Oxford, allowing Davis to join Reading Racers. He would spend seven years at Smallmead Stadium and consistently produced a high average including 10.32 in 1979. He helped Reading win the league title during the 1980 British League season.

From 1981 to 1983, Davis rode for Poole Pirates as their main heat leader before switching to Wimbledon for the 1984 season. He returned to Reading for three more years (1985–1987) and then rode for King's Lynn Stars and Swindon Robins respectively before retiring after the 1991 season.

== Retirement ==
After the end of his speedway career, Davis started a burger business in 1994, which progressed into event catering over the south of the country.

== World final appearances ==
=== Individual World Championship ===
- 1977 – (Sweden) Gothenburg, Ullevi – Reserve – did not ride
- 1980 – (Sweden) Gothenburg, Ullevi – 6th – 9pts
- 1988 – (Denmark) Vojens, Speedway Center – 12th – 3pts

=== World Team Cup ===
- 1977 – (Poland) Wrocław, Olympic Stadium (with Peter Collins / Malcolm Simmons / Michael Lee / Dave Jessup) – Winner – 37pts (6)
- 1981 – (West Germany) Olching, Olching Speedwaybahn (with Dave Jessup / Chris Morton / Kenny Carter / Gordon Kennett) – 2nd – 29pts (5)
- 1985 – USA Long Beach, Veterans Memorial Stadium (with Jeremy Doncaster / Phil Collins / Kelvin Tatum / Richard Knight) – 3rd – 13pts (0)

== European Grasstrack Championship ==
Final

- 1983 – (Germany) Nandlastadt 11pts (8th)
