= Andrew Silver (speedway rider) =

British motorcycle speedway rider

- Born: 13 January 1967; London, England
- Nationality: British (English)

Career history

Great Britain
- 1983–1985, 2009: Rye House Rockets
- 1984: Oxford Cheetahs
- 1984: Poole Pirates
- 1984: Wolverhampton Wolves
- 1985–1986: Cradley Heathens
- 1986–1987: Arena Essex Hammers
- 1988–1991: Swindon Robins
- 1992–1993: Eastbourne Eagles

Sweden
- 1990: Smederna

Individual honours
- 1987: National League Riders Championship
- 1987: National League Grand Slam Winner

Andrew George Silver (born 13 January 1967) is a former international motorcycle speedway rider from England. He earned 22 international caps for the England national speedway team.

== Family ==
Silver's father is former rider and speedway promoter Len Silver.

== Career ==
Silver took his first rides in 1983 at father Len's Rye House circuit, making rapid progress from reserve to heat leader in three years. When Len, decided to sell his interest in the Rockets, Andrew was widely expected to make the move into top flight British League racing – so it was a shock when he moved across to the Arena Essex Hammers for a reported £9,000.

Silver was capped by England at senior level, qualified for successive British Finals from 1986 to 1989, with a best place finish of seventh. He also recorded an average of 10.66 during the 1987 National League season for Arena Essex.

Silver also enjoyed individual success during his tenure with the Hammers, winning the National League Riders' Championship in 1987, held on 12 September at Brandon Stadium, to add to the Grand Slam title he won earlier that year at Oxford.

In 1988, Silver moved into top flight racing, signing for British League Swindon. His career stuttered from this point on and despite four seasons in Robins' colours he failed to live up to expectations. He moved to Eastbourne in 1992 and was joined by his father in 1993 before retiring at the start of the 1994 season. He retired from speedway early to take up a post in his father's ski holiday company.

After a long break from the sport, Silver made a successful comeback as a member of the 2009 Rye House Rockets team in the Premier League and scored a six-ride maximum for the Rockets in their victory over Stoke on 2 September 2009. At the end of the 2009 season, Silver retired once again.
