= 1984 Individual Speedway World Championship =

Motorcycle speedway world championship season

Seasons
- ← 1983 1985 →

The 1984 Individual Speedway World Championship was the 39th edition of the official World Championship to determine the world champion rider.

Without former champions Ivan Mauger, Ole Olsen, Peter Collins, Michael Lee, and Bruce Penhall, the 1984 World Final, held for the eighth time at the Ullevi Stadium in Gothenburg, Sweden, was seen by some as the battle of the second tier riders. Though history would ultimately prove the first and second placed riders as among the best Motorcycle speedway has ever seen, winning every World Final between them until the end of the 1980s.

Dane Erik Gundersen won his first Speedway World Championship from countryman Hans Nielsen who defeated American Lance King in a run-off for second and third places. Defending champion Egon Müller of West Germany could not reproduce his 1983 World Final form and finished 14th with just 3 points from his 5 rides. 1983 runner-up Billy Sanders of Australia, the track record holder at Ullevi, fared marginally better, finishing 11th with just 5 points.

== First round ==
=== British qualification ===
Date	Venue	Winner	2nd	3rd
Preliminary Round
8 April	Mildenhall Stadium, Mildenhall	Richard Knight	Kevin Jolly	Robert Henry
8 April	Boston Sports Stadium, Boston	Dave Perks	Colin Cook	Steve Lomas
10 April	Wessex Stadium, Weymouth	Marvyn Cox	Martin Yeates	Alun Rossiter
13 April	Powderhall Stadium, Edinburgh	Kenny McKinna	Dave Trownson	Charlie McKinna
17 April	Milton Keynes Stadium, Milton Keynes	Trevor Banks	Barry Thomas	Keith White
Quarter-Final
29 April	The Shay, Halifax	Kevin Jolly	Marvyn Cox	Barry Thomas

=== Swedish qualification ===
- Top 6 in each heat to Swedish final

(6 May, Gamla Målilla Motorstadion Målilla)
Pos	Rider	Points
1	Björn Andersson	14
2	Anders Kling	13
3	Alf Trofast	11
4	Hans Danielsson	11
5	Mikael Blixt	11
6	Lillebror Johansson	10
7	Kenneth Nyström	10
8	Erik Stenlund	9
9	Hans Wahlström	7
10	Tony Gudbrand	6
11	Thomas Hydling	5
12	Conny Ivarsson	5
13	Gert Carlsson	4
14	Dick Jegård	2
15	Tommy Celander	1
16	Roger Gustavsson	0

(5 May, Linköping Motorstadion Linköping)
Pos	Rider	Points
1	Jan Andersson	15
2	Per Jonsson	14
3	Uno Johansson	11
4	Mikael Aniander	11
5	Tommy Johansson	11
6	Patrik Karlsson	8
7	Göran Waltersson	8
8	Lars Andersson	8
9	Jan Davidsson	8
10	[Jan Ericsson	7
11	Tony Olsson	7
12	Mikael Reinholdsson	4
13	Åke Fridell	3
14	Bengt Jansson	2
15	Sören Brolin	2
16	Mats Olsson	0

(6 May, Orionparken Stadium Hallstavik)
Pos	Rider	Points
1	Pierre Brannefors	15
2	Leif Wahlman	13
3	Mikael Messing	12
4	Tommy Nilsson	12
5	Magnus Jonsson	11
6	Lars Hammarberg	9
7	Börje Ring	9
8	Per-Ove Gudmundsson	9
9	Ulf Blomqvist	7
10	Lars Ericsson	6
11	Patric Ericsson	6
12	Kent Rickardsson	4
13	Niclas Johansson	3
14	Jimmie Magnusson	2
15	Stefan Karlsson	1
16	Mikael Löfqvist	1

== Second round ==
=== Continental preliminary round ===
Date	Venue	Winner	2nd	3rd
22 April	(Socialist Federal Republic of Yugoslavia) Matija Gubec Stadium, Krško	(Poland) Edward Jancarz	(West Germany) Georg Gilgenreiner	(Poland) Jerzy Rembas
22 April	(Hungary) Hajdú Volán Stadion, Debrecen	(Czechoslovakia) Jiří Štancl	(Poland) Wojciech Żabiałowicz	(Hungary) János Oreskó
22 April	(Czechoslovakia) Slaný Speedway Stadium, Slaný	(Czechoslovakia) Václav Verner	(Poland) Maciej Jaworek	(Czechoslovakia) Stanislav Urban
22 April	(West Germany) Olching Speedwaybahn, Olching	(West Germany) Josef Aigner	(West Germany) Peter Wurtele	(Italy) Armando Castagna

=== British semi-finals ===
- 16 May
- (England) Wimborne Road, Poole
- Top 8 to British final

Pos.	Rider	Points
1	Michael Lee	15
2	Chris Morton	13
3	Phil Collins	12
4	Les Collins	11
5	Dave Jessup	9
6	Jeremy Doncaster	9
7	Mark Courtney	9
8	John Davis	8
9	Gordon Kennett	8
10	Kevin Smith	7
11	Kevin Jolly	6
12	Colin Richardson	5
13	Kenny McKinna	4
14	Alun Rossiter	3
15	Barry Thomas	1
16	John Barker	0

- 25 May
- (England) Oxford Stadium, Oxford
- Top 8 to British final

Pos.	Rider	Points
1	Neil Evitts	12+3
2	Andy Grahame	12+2
3	Kenny Carter	11
4	Martin Yeates	10
5	John Louis	10
6	Alan Grahame	10
7	Malcolm Simmons	10
8	Peter Collins	9
9	Simon Wigg	8
10	Marvyn Cox	7
11	Steve Bastable	7
12	Neil Collins	5
13	Richard Knight	3
14	Dave Perks	3
15	Colin Cook	2
16	Sean Willmott	1

== Third round ==
=== Continental quarter-finals ===
- Top 32 to Continental semi-finals

Date	Venue	Winner	2nd	3rd
5 May	(Poland) Stadion Wybrzeże, Gdańsk	(Czechoslovakia) Antonín Kasper Jr.	(Poland) Boleslaw Proch	(Czechoslovakia) Petr Ondrašík
5 May	(West Germany) Ellermühle Stadium, Landshut	(West Germany) Egon Muller	(West Germany) Karl Maier	(Czechoslovakia) Jiří Štancl
6 May	(Austria) Stadion Wiener Neustadt	(West Germany) Josef Aigner	(Poland) Andrzej Huszcza	(West Germany) Alois Wiesböck
6 May	(Hungary) Napos út, Szeged	(Soviet Union) Mikhail Starostin	(Poland) Edward Jancarz	(Czechoslovakia) Aleš Dryml Sr.

=== British Final ===
- 20 June 1984
- (England) Brandon Stadium, Coventry
- First 8 to Overseas final

Placing	Rider	Total	1	2	3	4	5	6	7	8	9	10	11	12	13	14	15	16	17	18	19	20	Pts	Pos	21
1	(England) (5) Kenny Carter	13		3			3					1					3					3	13	1	
2	(England) (10) Andy Grahame	12			3			2						3			1		3				12	2	
3	(England) (15) Dave Jessup	11				2			3			2						2	2				11	3	
4	(England) (4) Les Collins	10	2							3				1				3				1	10	4	
5	(England) (2) Martin Yeates	10	1					3				3				1				2			10	5	
6	(England) (1) Alan Grahame	9	3				3				0				3				T				9	6	
7	(England) (3) Simon Wigg	8	E						0				3				2				3		8	7	
8	(England) (7) Jeremy Doncaster	8		0					2					2	1					3			8	8	
9	(England) (14) Peter Collins	7				1		1					1		2							2	7	9	3
10	(England) (16) Neil Evitts	7				3				2	2						0			0			7	10	2
11	(England) (11) Gordon Kennett	6			2				1		1					2						0	6	11	
12	(England) (9) Chris Morton	5			E		1						2					1		1			5	12	
13	(England) (13) John Louis	4				X	2							0		0					2		4	13	
14	(England) (8) Phil Collins	3		X						0			E			3			E				3	14	
15	(England) (12) John Davis	3			1					1		0			0						1		3	15	
16	(England) (6) Mark Courtney	2		2				0			0							0			0		2	16	
R1	(England) (R1) Kevin Hawkins	1																	1				1	R1	
Placing	Rider	Total	1	2	3	4	5	6	7	8	9	10	11	12	13	14	15	16	17	18	19	20	Pts	Pos	21

m - exclusion for exceeding two minute time allowance • t - exclusion for touching the tapes • x - other exclusion • e - retired or mechanical failure • f - fell • ns - non-starter • nc - non-classify

gate A - inside	gate B	gate C	gate D - outside

=== American Final ===
- 9 June 1984
- (United States) Veterans Memorial Stadium, Long Beach,
- First 3 to Overseas final plus 1 reserve

Placing	Rider	Total	1	2	3	4	5	6	7	8	9	10	11	12	13	14	15	16	17	18	19	20	Pts	Pos	21
1	(United States) (11) Bobby Schwartz	15			3				3		3					3						3	15	1	
2	(United States) (6) Kelly Moran	14		3				3			2							3			3		14	2	
3	(United States) (12) Shawn Moran	13			2					3		3			3						2		13	3	
4	(United States) (1) Lance King	11	3				3				1				1				3				11	4	
5	(United States) (4) John Cook	10	2							2				3				2				1	10	5	
6	(United States) (7) Rick Miller	10		1					2					2	2					3			10	6	
7	(United States) (13) Mike Faria	9				3	2							1		2					1		9	7	
8	(United States) (8) Sam Ermolenko	6		2						E			3			0			1				6	8	
9	(United States) (5) Robert Pfetzing	6		0			1					2					3					F	6	9	
10	(United States) (15) Mike Curosco	5				1			1			0						1	2				5	10	
11	(United States) (14) Dennis Sigalos	4				2		2					F		-							-	4	11	
12	(United States) (3) Brad Oxley	3	0						E				2				1				0		3	12	
13	(United States) (9) Buddy Robinson	3			0		0						1					0		2			3	13	
14	(United States) (2) John Sandoma	4	1					0				1				1				1			4	14	
15	(United States) (10) Dubb Farrell	2			1			1						0			0		0				2	15	
16	(United States) (16) Alan Christian	0				X				-	-						-			-			0	16	
R1	(United States) (R1) Jim Lawson	4									0				0		2					2	4	R1	
R2	(United States) (R2) Keith Christo	1								1										0			1	R2	
Placing	Rider	Total	1	2	3	4	5	6	7	8	9	10	11	12	13	14	15	16	17	18	19	20	Pts	Pos	21

m - exclusion for exceeding two minute time allowance • t - exclusion for touching the tapes • x - other exclusion • e - retired or mechanical failure • f - fell • ns - non-starter • nc - non-classify

gate A - inside	gate B	gate C	gate D - outside

=== Australian Final ===
- 29 January 1984
- (Australia) Olympic Park, Mildura
- First 2 to Overseas final plus 1 reserve

Pos.	Rider	Heat Scores	Total
1	Phil Crump	(3,3,3,3,3)	15
2	Billy Sanders	(3,2,3,2,3)	13
3	Gary Guglielmi	(F,3,3,3,2)	11
4	John Titman	(3,3,2,1,1)	10
5	Rod Hunter	(0,2,2,3,3)	10
6	Steve Regeling	(1,3,0,3,2)	9
7	Steve Baker	(2,F,1,2,3)	8
8	Stan Bear	(2,1,0,2,2)	7
9	Glyn Taylor	(3,2,0,F,1)	6
10	Mark Fiora	(1,1,3,0,0)	5
11	David Jackson	(2,2,1,F,X)	5
12	Ray Palmer	(2,X,2,0,1)	5
13	Brent Nott	(0,2,2,1,0)	5
14	David Cheshire	(1,0,0,1,2)	4
15	Ashley Norton	(F,-,-,-,-)	0
16	John McNeill	(-,-,-,-,-)	0
R1	Greg Barrett	(1,1,1,0)	3
18	Chris Schmidt	(0,1,0,1,0)	2

=== New Zealand Final ===
- 4 February 1984
- (New Zealand) Ruapuna Speedway, Christchurch
- First 2 to Overseas final plus 1 reserve

Pos.	Rider	Total
1	Mitch Shirra	15
2	Larry Ross	14
3	David Bargh	13
4	Barry Briggs	11
5	Alan Mason	11
6	Peter Nightingale	9
7	Chris Martin	9
8	Mike Fullerton	8
9	Robin Hampton	7
10	Alan Fisher	6
11	Greg de Kok	5
12	Steve Duckworth	5
13	Alan Crosbie	4
14	Wayne Brown	2
15	Greg Holloway	1
16	Mark Richards	0

=== Danish Final ===
- (Denmark) Fladbro Speedway, Randers
- Top 6 to Nordic final

Date	Winner	2nd	3rd
6 May	Bo Petersen	Erik Gundersen	Hans Nielsen

=== Norwegian Final ===
- (Norway) Geiteryggen Speedwaybane, Skien
- 11 May 1984, first 2 to Nordic final

Pos.	Rider	Total
1	Tormod Langli	15
2	Einar Kyllingstad	13+3
3	Roy Otto	13+2
4	Ingvar Skogland	11
5	Dag Haland	11
6	Arne Svendsen	9
7	Kurt Ualand	8
8	Willy Tjessem	8
9	Asgeir Bjerga	7
10	Geir Aasland	7

=== Finland Final ===
- (Finland) Yyterin speedwaystadion, Pori
- 25 August 1983, top 1 (+2 seeded riders) to 1984 Nordic final

Pos.	Rider	Total
1	Ari Koponen	15
2	Juha Moksunen	14
3	Olli Tyrvainen	13
4	Kai Niemi	11
5	Pekka Hautamaki	11
6	Heimo Kaikko	11
7	Esa Mattila	9
8	Jorma Reima	8
9	Seppo Keskinen	8
10	Henry Kivela	5
11	Ossi Henriksson	3
12	Hannu Larronmaa	3
13	Harri Lankinen	3
14	Pentti Kallio (res)	3
15	Veli Pekka Kunelius	2
16	Rauli Makinen	1
17	Isto Maja	0

=== Swedish Finals ===
- (Sweden) Top 5 to Nordic final
- R1 (22 May, Sannaheds Motorstadion, Kumla)
- R2 (23 May, Ljungheden, Vastervik)
- R3 (24 May, Ullevi, Gothenburg)

Pos.	Rider	R1	R2	R3	Total
1	Jan Andersson	15	15	14	44
2	Pierre Brannefors	12	14	14	40
3	Björn Andersson	13	12	11	36
4	Mikael Blixt	11	12	9	32
5	Tommy Nilsson	12	10	8	30
6	Leif Wahlman	7	10	8	25+3
7	Per Jonsson	8	6	11	25+2
8	Patrik Karlsson	8	9	7	24
9	Hans Danielsson	8	8	8	24
10	Alf Trofast	6	8	8	22
11	Uno Johansson	4	6	8	18
12	Anders Kling	5	3	4	12
13	Göran Waltersson	2	2	4	8
14	Magnus Jonsson	4	2	0	6
15	Lillebror Johansson	5	-	-	5
16	Mikael Aniander	0	3	0	3

== Fourth round ==
=== Continental semi-finals ===
- 10 June
- (West Germany) Motodrom Halbemond, Norden
- Top 8 to Continental final

Pos.	Rider	Points
1	(West Germany) Egon Müller	14
2	(Czechoslovakia) Jiří Štancl	12
3	(West Germany) Karl Maier	12
4	(Czechoslovakia) Václav Verner	12
5	(West Germany) Peter Würtele	10
6	(West Germany) Georg Hack	10
7	(West Germany) Josef Aigner	9
8	(Netherlands) Henny Kroeze	8
9	(Poland) Andrzej Huszcza	7
10	(Italy) Armando Dal Chiele	7
11	(Poland) Roman Jankowski	5
12	(Poland) Leonard Raba	4
13	(Soviet Union) Igor Stolyarov	4
14	(Poland) Jan Krzystyniak	3
15	(Italy) Armando Castagna	3
16	(Czechoslovakia) Emil Sova	0

- 10 June
- (Czechoslovakia) Speedway Žarnovica, Žarnovica
- Top 8 to Continental final

Pos.	Rider	Points
1	(Poland) Zenon Kasprzak	13
2	(Czechoslovakia) Petr Ondrašík	11
3	(Czechoslovakia) Lubomir Jedek	11
4	(Soviet Union) Michail Starostin	11
5	(Czechoslovakia) Aleš Dryml Sr.	10
6	(Poland) Edward Jancarz	9
7	(Czechoslovakia) Zdeněk Schneiderwind	9
8	(Poland) Zenon Plech	8+3
9	(Poland) Boleslaw Proch	8+2
10	(Hungary) Istvan Rusz	8+1
11	(Czechoslovakia) Antonín Kasper Jr.	6
12	(Poland) Wojciech Zabialowicz	5
13	(West Germany) Fritz Bauer	5
14	(Czechoslovakia) Petr Kucera	4
15	(Soviet Union) Gennady Potechin	1

=== Nordic Final ===
- 12 June 1984
- (Sweden) Norrköping Motorstadion, Norrköping
- First 6 +1 reserve to Intercontinental final

Placing	Rider	Total	1	2	3	4	5	6	7	8	9	10	11	12	13	14	15	16	17	18	19	20	Pts	Pos	21
1	(Denmark) (13) Hans Nielsen	14				2	3							3		3					3		14	1	
2	(Denmark) (11) Erik Gundersen	12			3				2		3					2						2	12	2	
3	(Sweden) (15) Mikael Blixt	11				3			1			1						3	3				11	3	3
4	(Sweden) (5) Jan Andersson	11		3			X					3					2					3	11	4	2
5	(Finland) (14) Kai Niemi	11				1		3					3		3							1	11	5	1
6	(Denmark) (3) Bo Petersen	11	1						3				2				3				2		11	6	0
7	(Sweden) (2) Tommy Nilsson	10	3					2				2				X				3			10	7	
8	(Finland) (8) Ari Koponen	8		2						2			1			1			2				8	8	
9	(Denmark) (16) Peter Ravn	7				0				3	2						0			2			7	9	
10	(Denmark) (1) Jens Rasmussen	7	2				2				0				2				1				7	10	
11	(Sweden) (6) Pierre Brannefors	6		1				1			1							2			1		6	11	
12	(Sweden) (12) Bjorn Andersson	4			2					1		0			1						0		4	12	
13	(Denmark) (10) John Eskildsen	3			F			X						2			1		0				3	13	
14	(Finland) (4) Pekka Hautamaki	2	0							0				1				1				0	2	14	
15	(Norway) (9) Einar Kyllingstad	2			1		1						0					0		0			2	15	
16	(Norway) (7) Ray Otto	1		0					0					0	0					1			1	16	
R1	(Sweden) (R1) Patrick Karsson	0						0															0	R1	
Placing	Rider	Total	1	2	3	4	5	6	7	8	9	10	11	12	13	14	15	16	17	18	19	20	Pts	Pos	21

m - exclusion for exceeding two minute time allowance • t - exclusion for touching the tapes • x - other exclusion • e - retired or mechanical failure • f - fell • ns - non-starter • nc - non-classify

gate A - inside	gate B	gate C	gate D - outside

=== Overseas Final ===
- 15 July 1984
- (England) Hyde Road, Manchester
- First 10 to the Intercontinental Final plus 1 reserve

Placing	Rider	Total	1	2	3	4	5	6	7	8	9	10	11	12	13	14	15	16	17	18	19	20	Pts	Pos	21
1	(United States) (2) Lance King	15	3					3				3				3				3			15	1	
2	(Australia) (7) Phil Crump	12		3					3					3	2					1			12	2	
3	(United States) (10) Shawn Moran	11			3			E						3			2		3				11	3	
4	(Australia) (4) Billy Sanders	10	1							3				1				3				2	10	4	
5	(England) (8) Alan Grahame	10		2						2			1			3			2				10	5	
6	(New Zealand) (9) Mitch Shirra	9			1		3						3					2		0			9	6	
7	(England) (11) Kenny Carter	8			2				2		3					0						1	8	7	
8	(England) (14) Simon Wigg	8				1		1					2		1							3	8	8	
9	(New Zealand) (16) Larry Ross	7				2				1	1						1			2			7	9	
10	(United States) (5) Kelly Moran	6		1			1					2					2					0	6	10	3
11	(England) (15) Les Collins	6				3			1			0						1	1				6	11	2
12	(England) (13) Jeremy Doncaster	5				X	0							E		2					3		5	12	
13	(England) (1) Andy Grahame	5	2				1				2				0				0				5	13	
14	(United States) (12) Bobby Schwartz	3			0					0		1			E						2		3	14	
15	(England) (6) Dave Jessup	3		0				2			0							0			1		3	15	
16	(England) (3) Martin Yeates	0	0						0				0				0				0		0	16	
R1	(United States) (R1) John Cook	0																					0	R1	
Placing	Rider	Total	1	2	3	4	5	6	7	8	9	10	11	12	13	14	15	16	17	18	19	20	Pts	Pos	21

m - exclusion for exceeding two minute time allowance • t - exclusion for touching the tapes • x - other exclusion • e - retired or mechanical failure • f - fell • ns - non-starter • nc - non-classify

gate A - inside	gate B	gate C	gate D - outside

== Fifth round ==
=== Continental Final ===
- 22 July 1984
- (Soviet Union) Rivne Speedway Stadium, Rivne
- First 5 to World Final plus 1 reserve

Placing	Rider	Total	1	2	3	4	5	6	7	8	9	10	11	12	13	14	15	16	17	18	19	20	Pts	Pos	21
1	(West Germany) (14) Egon Muller	14				2		3					3		3							3	14	1	3
2	(West Germany) (5) Karl Maier	14		3			3					3					3					2	14	2	2
3	(Czechoslovakia) (2) Jiří Štancl	11	3					2				2				3				1			11	3	3
4	(Czechoslovakia) (11) Václav Verner	11			3				3		2					2						1	11	4	2
5	(Poland) (9) Edward Jancarz	10			2		2						2					2		2			10	5	
6	(Czechoslovakia) (16) Petr Ondrašík	9				0				1	3						2			3			9	6	
7	(West Germany) (6) Georg Hack	8		1				F			1							3			3		8	7	
8	(Czechoslovakia) (13) Aleš Dryml Sr.	7				1	1							2		1					2		7	8	
9	(Czechoslovakia) (8) Lubomir Jedek	6		0						3			1			0			2				6	9	
10	(Netherlands) (10) Henny Kroeze	6			F			1						3			1		1				6	10	
11	(Soviet Union) (7) Mikhail Starostin	6		2					2					F	2					0			6	11	
12	(Poland) (4) Andrzej Huszcza	4	1							2				1				X				0	4	12	
13	(Poland) (15) Zenon Plech	3				3			0			F						X	-				3	13	
14	(Czechoslovakia) (1) Zdenek Schneiderwind	2	2				F				0				0				0				2	14	
15	(West Germany) (3) Peter Wurtele	1	0						1				0				-				X		1	15	
16	(Poland) (12) Zenon Kasprzak	1			1					0		-			-						-		1	16	
R1	(Poland) (R1) Boleslaw Proch	5										1			1				3				5	R1	
Placing	Rider	Total	1	2	3	4	5	6	7	8	9	10	11	12	13	14	15	16	17	18	19	20	Pts	Pos	21

m - exclusion for exceeding two minute time allowance • t - exclusion for touching the tapes • x - other exclusion • e - retired or mechanical failure • f - fell • ns - non-starter • nc - non-classify

gate A - inside	gate B	gate C	gate D - outside

=== Intercontinental Final ===
- 20 July 1984
- (Denmark) Vojens Speedway Center, Vojens
- First 11 to World Final plus 1 reserve

Placing	Rider	Total	1	2	3	4	5	6	7	8	9	10	11	12	13	14	15	16	17	18	19	20	Pts	Pos	21
1	(United States) (12) Shawn Moran	13			3					3		2			3						2		13	1	
2	(England) (10) Simon Wigg	12			1			2						3			3		3				12	2	
3	(United States) (9) Lance King	11			2		3						2					2		2			11	3	
4	(Denmark) (14) Bo Petersen	9				3		3					0		2							1	9	4	
5	(New Zealand) (15) Mitch Shirra	9				1			3			1						3	1				9	5	
6	(United States) (5) Kelly Moran	8		3			F					3					2					0	8	6	
7	(Finland) (16) Kai Niemi	8				2				0	3						0			3			8	7	
8	(Denmark) (13) Hans Nielsen	8				0	E							2		3					3		8	8	
9	(Denmark) (8) Erik Gundersen	8		2						2			3			1			0				8	9	
10	(Sweden) (1) Jan Andersson	7	2				2				1				0				2				7	10	
11	(Australia) (11) Billy Sanders	7			0				1		2					2						2	7	11	
12	(England) (4) Alan Grahame	6	1							1				1				0				3	6	12	3
13	(England) (3) Kenny Carter	6	3						0				1				1				1		6	13	2
14	(Australia) (7) Phil Crump	5		1					2					0	1					1			5	14	
15	(New Zealand) (2) Larry Ross	1	0					1				0				0				0			1	15	
16	(Sweden) (6) Mikael Blixt	1		F				0			0							1			0		1	16	
Placing	Rider	Total	1	2	3	4	5	6	7	8	9	10	11	12	13	14	15	16	17	18	19	20	Pts	Pos	21

m - exclusion for exceeding two minute time allowance • t - exclusion for touching the tapes • x - other exclusion • e - retired or mechanical failure • f - fell • ns - non-starter • nc - non-classify

gate A - inside	gate B	gate C	gate D - outside

== World Final ==
- 1 September 1984
- (Sweden) Ullevi, Gothenburg.

Placing	Rider	Total	1	2	3	4	5	6	7	8	9	10	11	12	13	14	15	16	17	18	19	20	Pts	Pos	21
1	(Denmark) (5) Erik Gundersen	14		2			3					3					3					3	14	1	
2	(Denmark) (3) Hans Nielsen	13	3						3				3				1				3		13	2	3
3	(United States) (14) Lance King	13				3		3					2		3							2	13	3	2
4	(United States) (10) Kelly Moran	11			2			2						2			2		3				11	4	
5	(New Zealand) (7) Mitch Shirra	10		3					2					1	1					3			10	5	
6	(England) (11) Simon Wigg	9			3				1		2					3						0	9	6	
7	(Denmark) (2) Bo Petersen	9	2					1				2				2				2			9	7	
8	(United States) (6) Shawn Moran	7		1				0			3							1			2		7	8	
9	(West Germany) (12) Karl Maier	7			0					3		1			2						1		7	9	
10	(Sweden) (4) Jan Andersson	6	0							2				3				0				1	6	10	
11	(Australia) (1) Billy Sanders	5	1				2				1				0				1				5	11	
12	(Finland) (9) Kai Niemi	4			1		1						0					2		0			4	12	
13	(Czechoslovakia) (16) Petr Ondrašík	3				2				0	0						E			1			3	13	
14	(West Germany) (8) Egon Muller	3		0						1			1			1			F				3	14	
15	(Czechoslovakia) (13) Jiří Štancl	1				1	0							0		0					0		1	15	
16	(Czechoslovakia) (15) Václav Verner	0				0			0			E						-	-				0	16	
R1	(England) (R1) Alan Grahame	5																3	2				5	R1	
Placing	Rider	Total	1	2	3	4	5	6	7	8	9	10	11	12	13	14	15	16	17	18	19	20	Pts	Pos	21

m - exclusion for exceeding two minute time allowance • t - exclusion for touching the tapes • x - other exclusion • e - retired or mechanical failure • f - fell • ns - non-starter • nc - non-classify

gate A - inside	gate B	gate C	gate D - outside
