= 1983 Individual Speedway World Championship =

World motorcycle speedway competition

Seasons
- ← 1982 1984 →

The 1983 Individual Speedway World Championship was the 38th edition of the official World Championship to determine the world champion rider. It was the first time the World Final had been held in West Germany.

== Final summary ==
A near-capacity crowd of around 50,000 at the 400 metres (440 yards) long Motodrom Halbemond circuit, saw local favourite Egon Müller became the first German rider to win the World Championship. Australian champion Billy Sanders, scored his best ever World Championship placing by finishing second, with England's 1980 World Champion Michael Lee finishing third.

With both Sanders and former champion Lee in good form, and with the winner of the previous two world finals Bruce Penhall having retired from speedway while on the podium at the 1982 world final, the 1983 final was expected to be one of the most open in years. Others including Kenny Carter, Dennis Sigalos, and Danes Ole Olsen, Hans Nielsen and Erik Gundersen, were all expected to challenge. Like surprise winner Jerzy Szczakiel who won at home in Poland in 1973, Egon Müller was expected to do well in front of his home crowd, but wasn't among the pre-meeting favourites.

In his last world final appearance Ole Olsen, the 1971, 1975 and 1978 World Champion, finished 6th with 10 points. Olsen won his last ride, defeating Gundersen, Czechoslovakia's Jiří Štancl, and American Lance King in heat 18.

== First round ==
=== New Zealand qualification ===
Date	Event	Venue	Winner	2nd	3rd
??	South Island final	Oreti Park Speedway, Invercargill	Ivan Mauger	Larry Ross	Alan Mason
??	North Island final	Meeanee Speedway, Napier	David Bargh	Mitch Shirra	Craig Pendlebury

=== British qualification ===
Date	Venue	Winner	2nd	3rd
Preliminary Round
12 April	Wessex Stadium, Weymouth	Kevin Smith	Mike Ferreira	Melvyn Taylor
15 April	Powderhall Stadium, Edinburgh	Alan Emerson	Martin Dixon	Bobby Beaton
19 April	Milton Keynes Stadium, Milton Keynes	Charlie McKinna	Neil Middleditch	Peter Carr
21 April	Oxford Stadium, Oxford	Simon Wigg	Barry Thomas	Sean Willmott
27 April	Long Eaton Stadium, Long Eaton	Colin Richardson	David Gagen	Joe Owen
Quarter-Final
30 April	King's Lynn Stadium, King's Lynn	Simon Wigg	Sean Willmott	Melvyn Taylor

=== Swedish qualification ===
- Top 6 in each heat to Swedish final

(7 May, Nässjö Motorstadion Nässjö)
Pos	Rider	Points
1	Hans Danielsson	14
2	Lennart Bengtsson	12
3	Björn Andersson	12
4	Kent Bäär	11
5	Karl-Erik Claesson	9+3
6	Dick Jegård	9+2
7	Per-Ove Gudmundsson	9+1
8	Lars Hammarberg	8
9	Börje Klingberg	6
10	Kenneth Gustafsson	6
11	Kent Björk	6
12	Anders Eriksson	5
13	Jon Hovind	3
14	Stefan Andersson	3
15	Håkan Andersson	2
16	Peder Messing	2

(9 May, Motala Arena Motala)
Pos	Rider	Points
1	Lillebror Johansson	13
2	Bernt Persson	12
3	Conny Samuelsson	12
4	Tommy Nilsson	11
5	Ulf Blomqvist	11
6	Hans Hallén	10
7	Erik Stenlund	8
8	Jan Ericsson	8
9	Magnus Jonsson	8
10	Börje Ring	6
11	Per Blom	6
12	Alf Trofast	5
13	Sören Brolin	5
14	Jan Davidsson	4
15	Eddie Davidsson	1
16	Sören Karlsson	0

(9 May, Gamla Målilla Motorstadion Målilla)
Pos	Rider	Points
1	Uno Johansson	13
2	Pierre Brannefors	12
3	Mikael Blixt	12
4	Anders Kling	11
5	Gert Carlsson	11
6	Göran Waltersson	10
7	Mikael Messing	8
8	Mats Olsson	7
9	Lars Rosberg	6
10	Lars Carlsson	6
11	Åke Fridell	4
12	Lars Ericsson	4
13	Karl-Henry Boo	4
14	Bengt Jansson	4
15	Steinar Rydén	4
16	Conny Gustafsson	4

== Second round ==
=== Continental preliminary round ===
Date	Venue	Winner	2nd	3rd
23 April	(West Germany) Ruhpoldinger Stadion, Ruhpolding	(Italy) Giuseppe Marzotto	(Czechoslovakia) Petr Kucera	(Poland) Andrzej Huszcza
24 April	(Hungary) Napos út, Szeged	(Czechoslovakia) Milan Špinka	(Poland) Boleslaw Proch	(Poland) Jerzy Rembas
24 April	(Socialist Federal Republic of Yugoslavia) Petišovci Stadium, Lendava	(Czechoslovakia) Petr Ondrašík	(Italy) Armando Dal Chiele	(Hungary) János Oreskó
24 April	(West Germany) Anton Treffer Stadion, Neustadt	(Soviet Union) Vladimir Klychkov	(Soviet Union) Piotr Belyaev	(West Germany) Peter Wurterle

=== British semi-finals ===
- 8 May
- (England) Arlington Stadium, Eastbourne
- Top 8 to British final

Pos.	Rider	Points
1	John Davis	13
2	Paul Woods	12
3	Dave Jessup	10+3
4	Malcolm Simmons	10+2
5	Gordon Kennett	10+1
6	Phil Collins	9
7	Sean Willmott	9
8	Colin Richardson	8+3
9	Alan Grahame	8+2
10	Joe Owen	8+1
11	Jeremy Doncaster	7
12	John Louis	5
13	Louis Carr	4
14	Kevin Smith	3
15	Neil Middleditch	2
16	Kevin Jolly	2

- 17 May
- (England) Leicester Stadium, Leicester
- Top 8 to British final

Pos.	Rider	Points
1	Peter Collins	13
2	Simon Wigg	12
3	Neil Collins	11+3
4	Michael Lee	11+2
5	Kenny Carter	11+1
6	Chris Morton	10
7	Les Collins	9+3
8	Andy Grahame	9+2
9	Mark Courtney	9+f
10	Steve Bastable	6
11	Melvyn Taylor	5
12	Reg Wilson	4
13	Malcolm Holloway	4
14	Tim Hunt	3
15	Mike Ferreira	2
16	Nigel Flatman	1

== Third round ==
=== Continental quarter-finals ===
- Top 32 to Continental semi-finals

Date	Venue	Winner	2nd	3rd
6 May	(Austria) Stadion Wiener Neustadt	(West Germany) Karl Maier	(Czechoslovakia) Jiří Štancl	(Poland) Marek Kepa
8 May	(Hungary) Borsod Volán Stadion, Miskolc	(Soviet Union) Mikhail Starostin	(Poland) Bogusław Nowak	(Soviet Union) Rif Saitgareev
8 May	(Bulgaria) Shumen Motopista, Shumen	(Czechoslovakia) Petr Ondrašík	(Soviet Union) Viktor Kuznetsov	(Italy) Armando Dal Chiele
8 May	(Italy) Santa Marina Stadium, Lonigo	(West Germany) Egon Muller	(Poland) Roman Jankowski	(Poland) Zenon Plech

=== Sweden Finals ===
- (Sweden) Top 5 over three meetings + Jan Andersson (seeded) to Nordic final
- R1 (24 May, Kalvholmen Motorstadion, Karlstad)
- R2 (25 May, Gubbängens IP, Stockholm)
- R3 (27 May, Snälltorpet, Eskilstuna)

Pos.	Rider	R1	R2	R3	Total
1	Tommy Nilsson	13	13	14	40
2	Pierre Brannefors	10	15	13	38
3	Uno Johansson	12	11	10	33
4	Anders Kling	10	12	8	30
5	Bernt Persson	5	10	14	29
6	Lillebror Johansson	13	5	9	27
7	Karl Erik Claesson	13	9	2	24
8	Hans Danielsson	3	9	11	23
9	Conny Samuelsson	7	4	8	19
10	Gert Carlsson	6	8	4	18
11	Goran Waltersson	8	4	3	15
12	Per Ove Gudmundsson	-	9	6	15
13	Ulf Blomqvist	8	3	3	14
14	Lennart Bengtsson	1	-	9	10
15	Hans Hallén	2	6	0	8
16	Bent Baar	4	2	0	6
17	Dick Jaglard	2	2	0	4
18	Mikael Messing	4	-	-	4

=== Norwegian qualifying ===
- (Norway) Elgane Speedway, Varhaug
- 24 April, top 2 to Nordic final

Pos.	Rider	Points
1	Tormod Langli	15
2	Dag Haland	11+3
3	Dagfinn Jorgensen	11+2
4	Roy Otto	11+1
5	Asgeir Bjerga	10
6	Jörn Haugvaldstad	9
7	Geir Aasland	7
8	Kurt Ueland	7
9	Sigvart Pedersen	7
10	Kjell Gimre	6
11	Tom Fjeldberg	6
12	Arne Svendsen	6
13	Ingve Madland	5
14	Roy Martinsen	4
15	Lars Otto Holt	3
16	Nils O. Haraldsen	0

=== Finland Final ===
- (Finland) Iinat Motor Sports Center, Oulu
- 8 August 1982, top 3 to 1983 Nordic final

Pos.	Rider	Total
1	Kai Niemi	15
2	Ari Koponen	14
3	Olli Tyrvainen	13
4	Veijo Tuoriniemi	11
5	Hannu Lehtonen	11
6	Pekka Hautamaki	8
7	Jari Kortelainen	8
8	Markku Haapala	7
9	Heimo Kaikko	7
10	Seppo Keskinen	7
11	Timo Kiansten	7
12	Kari Valtonen	4
13	Ismo Kivela	3
14	Ari Heinonen	3
15	Pasi Valtonen	1
16	Pekka Turkia	1
17	Markku Parkkari (res)	0
18	Isto Maja (res)	0
19	Seppo Nykanen (res)	0

=== Danish Final ===
- 9 May 1983
- (Denmark) Fjelsted Speedway Stadium, Harndrup
- First 6 to Nordic final

Pos.	Rider	Total
1	Hans Nielsen	15
2	Erik Gundersen	13
3	Ole Olsen	12+3
4	Tommy Knudsen	12+2
5	Peter Ravn	11
6	Finn Rune Jensen	8
7	Preben Eriksen	8
8	Hans Ove Cristinsen	7
9	Kent Noer	7
10	Jens Rasmussen	6
11	Finn Thomsen	6
12	Flemming Pedersen	6
13	Alf Busk	6
14	Hans Albert Klinge	2
15	Bent Juul Larsen	1
16	Kjeld Hansen	0

=== British Final ===
- 1 June 1983
- (England) Brandon Stadium, Coventry
- First 8 to Overseas final

Placing	Rider	Total	1	2	3	4	5	6	7	8	9	10	11	12	13	14	15	16	17	18	19	20	Pts	Pos	21
1	(England) (4) Chris Morton	12	2							2				3				2				3	12	1	
2	(England) (12) Michael Lee	11			0					3		2			3						3		11	2	
3	(England) (9) Andy Grahame	10			2		0						2					3		3			10	3	3
4	(England) (5) Kenny Carter	10		2			3					0					3					2	10	4	2
5	(England) (1) Peter Collins	10	1				1				3				2				3				10	5	1
6	(England) (13) John Davis	10				2	2							2		2					2		10	6	0
7	(England) (2) Phil Collins	9	0					3				1				3				2			9	7	
8	(England) (15) Les Collins	8				0			2			3						1	2				8	8	
9	(England) (3) Paul Woods	7	3						1				1				1				1		7	9	
10	(England) (11) Dave Jessup	6			3				3		F					M						M	6	10	
11	(England) (14) Simon Wigg	6				3		0					3		0							E	6	11	
12	(England) (6) Gordon Kennett	6		3				1			2							0			0		6	12	
13	(England) (16) Colin Richardson	6				1				1	1						2			1			6	13	
14	(England) (10) Malcolm Simmons	5			1			2						1			0		1				5	14	
15	(England) (7) Sean Willmott	2		1					0					0	1					0			2	15	
16	(England) (8) Neil Collins	1		0						0			E			1			0				1	16	
R1	(England) (R1) Kevin Hawkins	1														0						1	1	R1	
Placing	Rider	Total	1	2	3	4	5	6	7	8	9	10	11	12	13	14	15	16	17	18	19	20	Pts	Pos	21

m - exclusion for exceeding two minute time allowance • t - exclusion for touching the tapes • x - other exclusion • e - retired or mechanical failure • f - fell • ns - non-starter • nc - non-classify

gate A - inside	gate B	gate C	gate D - outside

=== American Final ===
- 11 June 1983
- (United States) Veterans Memorial Stadium, Long Beach
- First 4 to Overseas final

Pos.	Rider	Total
1	Dennis Sigalos	15
2	Mike Faria	11+3
3	Lance King	11+2
4	Shawn Moran	10+3
5	Rick Miller	10+2
6	John Cook	10+1
7	Dubb Ferrell	9
8	Ron Preston	8
9	Mike Bast	7
10	Kelly Moran	7
11	Bobby Schwartz	7
12	Brad Oxley	5
13	Steve Lucero	3
14	Shawn McConnell	3
15	Alan Christian	2
16	Gene Woods	1

=== Australian Final ===
- 21 January 1983
- (Australia) Speedway Park, Adelaide
- First 2 to Overseas final

Pos.	Rider	Heat Scores	Total
1	Billy Sanders	(3,3,3,3,3)	15
2	Glyn Taylor	(3,2,2,3,3)	13
3	Phil Crump	(3,3,3,X,3)	12
4	Gary Guglielmi	(2,1,3,2,3+3)	11+3
5	Rod Hunter	(2,2,2,3,2+2)	11+2
6	Danny Kennedy	(1,1,3,3,0)	8
7	Les Sawyer	(1,3,1,2,1)	8
8	Steve Baker	(3,0,2,0,2)	7
9	Mark Fiora	(2,2,0,1,2)	7
10	John Titman	(X,2,1,2,2)	7
11	Steve Regeling	(0,3,0,2,1)	6
12	David Jackson	(1,2,0,1,0)	4
13	Dean Johnson	(0,1,1,2,1)	4
14	Rob Ashton	(2,0,1,1,0)	4
15	Kevin O'Connell (Res)	(-,-,2,-,-)	2
16	Wayne Baxter	(0,0,0,0,1)	1
17	Tony Boyle (Res)	(1,-,-,-,-)	1
18	Chris Higgs	(0,0,0,0,0)	0

=== New Zealand final ===
- 21 February 1983
- (New Zealand) Ruapuna Speedway, Christchurch
- First 2 to overseas final

Pos.	Rider	Total
1	Mitch Shirra	14
2	Larry Ross	14
3	David Bargh	13
4	Ivan Mauger	13
5	Alan Mason	11
6	Chris Martin	10
7	Robin Hampton	7
8	Roger Wright	7
9	Barry Free	7
10	Craig Blackett	6
11	Max Brown	6
12	Peter Nightingale	5
13	Craig Williamson	3
14	Merv Salt	2
15	Martin Waygang	2
16	Alan Crosbie	0

== Fourth round ==
=== Continental semi-finals ===
- 12 July
- (West Germany) Rottalstadion, Pocking
- Top 8 to Continental final

Pos.	Rider	Points
1	(West Germany) Egon Müller	15
2	(Netherlands) Henny Kroeze	13
3	(Poland) Roman Jankowski	10
4	(Hungary) Zoltan Hajdu	10
5	(Soviet Union) Michail Starostin	10
6	(Czechoslovakia) Aleš Dryml Sr.	9
7	(Soviet Union) Rif Saitgareev	9
8	(Czechoslovakia) Emil Sova	8+3
9	(Poland) Zenon Plech	8+2
10	(Czechoslovakia) Milan Špinka	7
11	(Poland) Boguslaw Nowak	7
12	(Italy) Ottaviano Righetto	
13	(Poland) Jerzy Rembaz	3
14	(Hungary) Zoltán Adorján	3
15	(Poland) Zbignew Zabialowicz	1
16	(West Germany) Georg Hack	1

- 12 July
- (Czechoslovakia) Slaný Speedway Stadium, Slaný
- Top 8 to Continental final

Pos.	Rider	Points
1	(West Germany) Karl Maier	15
2	(Czechoslovakia) Jiří Štancl	12
3	(Czechoslovakia) Antonín Kasper Jr.	12
4	(Poland) Andrzej Huszcza	12
5	(Italy) Armando Dal Chiele	11
6	(Soviet Union) Valerij Gordeev	10
7	(Soviet Union) Viktor Kuznetsov	9
8	(Czechoslovakia) Petr Ondrašík	8
9	(Poland) Miroslaw Berlinski	7
10	(Czechoslovakia) Pavel Karnas	7
11	(Poland) Marek Kepa	7
12	(Bulgaria) Nikolaj Manev	3
13	(Bulgaria) Angel Eftimov	3
14	(Czechoslovakia) Stanislav Urban	1
15	(Bulgaria) Orlin Jankiev	1
16	(West Germany) Christian Brandt	1
17	(Hungary) Janos Oresko (res)	1

=== Overseas Final ===
- 17 July 1983
- (England) Hyde Road, Manchester
- First 10 to the Intercontinental Final plus 1 reserve

Placing	Rider	Total	1	2	3	4	5	6	7	8	9	10	11	12	13	14	15	16	17	18	19	20	Pts	Pos	21
1	(England) (11) Phil Collins	12			1				3		3					2						3	12	1	
2	(England) (16) Kenny Carter	11				3				3	0						2			3			11	2	3
3	(New Zealand) (1) Mitch Shirra	11	2				2				1				3				3				11	3	2
4	(New Zealand) (8) Larry Ross	10		3						2			2			3			0				10	4	
5	(Australia) (2) Billy Sanders	10	3					3				3				1				F			10	5	
6	(United States) (6) Dennis Sigalos	9		0				2			2							2			3		9	6	
7	(England) (7) Chris Morton	9		1					2					3	1					2			9	7	
8	(England) (4) Andy Grahame	9	1							1				2				3				2	9	8	
9	(England) (5) Michael Lee	8		2			3					1					1					1	8	9	
10	(United States) (15) Lance King	8				2			1			2						1	2				8	10	
11	(United States) (14) Shawn Moran	7				1		1					3		2							0	7	11	
12	(England) (10) Les Collins	6			2			0						0			3		1				6	12	
13	(England) (12) John Davis	4			3					0		0			0						1		4	13	
14	(England) (3) Peter Collins	3	E						0				1				0				2		3	14	
15	(Australia) (9) Glyn Taylor	2			E		1						0					0		1			2	15	
16	(United States) (13) Mike Faria	1				0	0							1		E					F		1	16	
Placing	Rider	Total	1	2	3	4	5	6	7	8	9	10	11	12	13	14	15	16	17	18	19	20	Pts	Pos	21

m - exclusion for exceeding two minute time allowance • t - exclusion for touching the tapes • x - other exclusion • e - retired or mechanical failure • f - fell • ns - non-starter • nc - non-classify

gate A - inside	gate B	gate C	gate D - outside

=== Nordic Final ===
- 12 June 1983
- (Norway) Elgane Speedway, Varhaug
- First 6 to Intercontinental final plus 1 reserve

Placing	Rider	Total	1	2	3	4	5	6	7	8	9	10	11	12	13	14	15	16	17	18	19	20	Pts	Pos	21
1	(Denmark) (4) Hans Nielsen	15	3							3				3				3				3	15	1	
2	(Denmark) (12) Erik Gundersen	14			3					2		3			3						3		14	2	
3	(Denmark) (14) Ole Olsen	12				2		3					3		2							2	12	3	
4	(Denmark) (5) Peter Ravn	11		3			3					1					3					1	11	4	
5	(Sweden) (9) Jan Andersson	11			2		2						2					2		3			11	5	
6	(Sweden) (13) Pierre Brannefors	10				3	1							2		2					2		10	6	3
7	(Finland) (2) Kai Niemi	10	2					1				2				3				2			10	7	2
8	(Denmark) (6) Tommy Knudsen	8		1				2			3							1			1		8	8	
9	(Denmark) (15) Finn Rune Jensen	7				1			3			0						F	3				7	9	
10	(Finland) (8) Ari Koponen	5		2						0			1			0			2				5	10	
11	(Sweden) (11) Tommy Nilsson	5			0				2		2					1						0	5	11	
12	(Norway) (3) Tormod Langli	3	0						1				0				2				0		3	12	
13	(Sweden) (16) Uno Johansson	3				0				1	1						0			1			3	13	
14	(Finland) (10) Olli Tyrväinen	3			1			0						1			1		0				3	14	
15	(Norway) (1) Dag Haaland	2	1				0				0				0				1				2	15	
16	(Sweden) (7) Anders Kling	1		0					0					0	1					0			1	16	
Placing	Rider	Total	1	2	3	4	5	6	7	8	9	10	11	12	13	14	15	16	17	18	19	20	Pts	Pos	21

m - exclusion for exceeding two minute time allowance • t - exclusion for touching the tapes • x - other exclusion • e - retired or mechanical failure • f - fell • ns - non-starter • nc - non-classify

gate A - inside	gate B	gate C	gate D - outside

== Fifth round ==
=== Continental Final ===
- 6 August 1983
- (Poland) Rybnik Municipal Stadium, Rybnik
- First 5 to World Final plus 1 reserve

Placing	Rider	Total	1	2	3	4	5	6	7	8	9	10	11	12	13	14	15	16	17	18	19	20	Pts	Pos	21
1	(Poland) (2) Zenon Plech	15	3					3				3				3				3			15	1	
2	(West Germany) (11) Egon Muller	14			3				3		3					2						3	14	2	
3	(Czechoslovakia) (4) Jiří Štancl	12	1							3				3				3				2	12	3	
4	(Czechoslovakia) (3) Petr Ondrašík	11	2						2				2				3				2		11	4	
5	(Czechoslovakia) (13) Antonín Kasper Jr.	10				3	3							2		1					1		10	5	
6	(West Germany) (16) Karl Maier	9				2				2	1						2			2			9	6	3
7	(Netherlands) (14) Henny Kroeze	9				1		1					3		3							1	9	7	2
8	(Poland) (6) Andrzej Huszcza	8		3				E			2							E			3		8	8	
9	(Soviet Union) (9) Valery Gordeev	7			2		1						1					2		1			7	9	
10	(Soviet Union) (7) Mikhail Starostin	5		2					0					1	2					0			5	10	
11	(Czechoslovakia) (5) Aleš Dryml Sr.	5		E			2					2					1					0	5	11	
12	(Hungary) (8) Zoltan Hajdu	4		1						1			0			0			2				4	12	
13	(Czechoslovakia) (10) Emil Sova	4			1			2						0			0		1				4	13	
14	(Soviet Union) (1) Rif Saitgareev	3	0				0				0				0				3				3	14	
15	(Soviet Union) (12) Viktor Kuznetsov	2			0					0		1			1						0		2	15	
16	(Italy) (15) Armando Dal Chiele	2				0			1			0						1	X				2	16	
Placing	Rider	Total	1	2	3	4	5	6	7	8	9	10	11	12	13	14	15	16	17	18	19	20	Pts	Pos	21

m - exclusion for exceeding two minute time allowance • t - exclusion for touching the tapes • x - other exclusion • e - retired or mechanical failure • f - fell • ns - non-starter • nc - non-classify

gate A - inside	gate B	gate C	gate D - outside

=== Intercontinental Final ===
- 7 August 1983
- (England) White City Stadium, London
- First 11 to World Final plus 1 reserve

Placing	Rider	Total	1	2	3	4	5	6	7	8	9	10	11	12	13	14	15	16	17	18	19	20	Pts	Pos	21
1	(Denmark) (1) Hans Nielsen	14	3				3				3				2				3				14	1	
2	(England) (8) Michael Lee	12		3						2			3			2			2				12	2	
3	(Denmark) (7) Erik Gundersen	11		0					3					3	3					2			11	3	
4	(United States) (14) Dennis Sigalos	10				3		2					2		X							3	10	4	
5	(England) (4) Kenny Carter	10	0							3				2				3				2	10	5	
6	(Australia) (13) Billy Sanders	10				1	2							1		3					3		10	6	
7	(Denmark) (2) Ole Olsen	9	2					3				3				1				0			9	7	
8	(New Zealand) (16) Mitch Shirra	9				2				1	2						1			3			9	8	
9	(England) (6) Chris Morton	7		2				1			0							2			2		7	9	
10	(United States) (3) Lance King	7	1						2				1				3				0		7	10	
11	(England) (12) Phil Collins	6			2					0		2			1						1		6	11	
12	(Denmark) (10) Peter Ravn	6			3			E						0			2		1				6	12	
13	(Sweden) (9) Jan Andersson	3			0		1						0					1		1			3	13	
14	(Sweden) (11) Pierre Brannefors	3			1				0		1					0						1	3	14	
15	(England) (15) Andy Grahame	2				0			1			1						0	0				2	15	
16	(New Zealand) (5) Larry Ross	1		1			E					0					0					0	1	16	
Placing	Rider	Total	1	2	3	4	5	6	7	8	9	10	11	12	13	14	15	16	17	18	19	20	Pts	Pos	21

m - exclusion for exceeding two minute time allowance • t - exclusion for touching the tapes • x - other exclusion • e - retired or mechanical failure • f - fell • ns - non-starter • nc - non-classify

gate A - inside	gate B	gate C	gate D - outside

== World Final ==
- 4 September 1983
- (West Germany) Motodrom Halbemond, Norden.
- Referee: ( (Sweden) ) Rolf Randborg

Placing	Rider	Total	1	2	3	4	5	6	7	8	9	10	11	12	13	14	15	16	17	18	19	20	Pts	Pos
1	(West Germany) (12) Egon Müller	15			3					3		3			3						3		15	1
2	(Australia) (5) Billy Sanders	12		3			3					2					2					2	12	2
3	(England) (4) Michael Lee	11	3							2				0				3				3	11	3
4	(Denmark) (16) Erik Gundersen	10				3				0	2						3			2			10	4
5	(England) (10) Kenny Carter	10			2			3						3			1		1				10	5
6	(Denmark) (7) Ole Olsen	10		1					3					1	2					3			10	6
7	(Denmark) (13) Hans Nielsen	9				2	2							2		3					e		9	7
8	(United States) (1) Dennis Sigalos	8	2				1				3				0				2				8	8
9	(West Germany) (15) Karl Maier	8				1			1			1						2	3				8	9
10	(England) (8) Chris Morton	7		2						1			3			1			0				7	10
11	(New Zealand) (3) Mitch Shirra	7	1						2				2				0				2		7	11
12	(United States) (2) Lance King	4	0					2				0				2				0			4	12
13	(England) (14) Phil Collins	4				0		1					1		1							1	4	13
14	(Czechoslovakia) (6) Antonín Kasper Jr.	3		0				0			1							1			1		3	14
15	(Poland) (11) Zenon Plech	1			1				0		0					0						0	1	15
16	(Czechoslovakia) (9) Jiří Štancl	1			0		0						0					0		1			1	16
	(Denmark) (17) Peter Ravn	0																					0	
	(Netherlands) (18) Henny Kroeze	0																					0	
Placing	Rider	Total	1	2	3	4	5	6	7	8	9	10	11	12	13	14	15	16	17	18	19	20	Pts	Pos

m - exclusion for exceeding two minute time allowance • t - exclusion for touching the tapes • x - other exclusion • e - retired or mechanical failure • f - fell • ns - non-starter • nc - non-classify

gate A - inside	gate B	gate C	gate D - outside
