= 1982 British League season =

British speedway season

- League: British League
- No. of competitors: 15
- Champions: Belle Vue Aces
- Knockout Cup: Cradley Heath Heathens
- League Cup: Cradley Heath Heathens
- Individual: Kenny Carter
- Midland Cup: Coventry Bees
- Highest average: Kenny Carter
- Division/s below: 1982 National League

The 1982 British League season was the 48th season of the top tier of motorcycle speedway in the United Kingdom and the 18th known as the British League.

== Summary ==
Hull Vikings had disbanded following the loss of their home at the Boulevard.

After a ten-year drought Belle Vue Aces won the league pushing defending champions Cradley Heath into second place. A special performance was going to be needed to finish ahead of the star-studded Cradley Heath team and it was the consistency of the support riders which helped Belle Vue achieve this. England international Chris Morton was the heat leader but he was supported by a group of consistent scorers throughout the season that included Larry Ross (a former 5 times New Zealand champion), the former world champion Peter Collins, the Carr brothers Louis and Peter, Dane Peter Ravn and Scot Jim McMillan. Cradley Heath went on to win their third Knockout Cup in four years and the League Cup. The Midlands' club had been in position to take the league title, but their heat leader Bruce Penhall quit speedway immediately after winning his second world title in September to pursue an acting career (specifically for a role in CHiPs).

Hackney Wick Stadium was subject to a second fatal accident within three years when American Denny Pyeatt lost his life in a league match on 16 July. Pyeatt riding for Reading Racers crashed into a lamp standard. Swindon rider Martin Hewlett suffered a stroke after the Swindon versus Birmingham fixture in September and died four days later on 15 September.

== Final table ==
| Pos | Team | PL | W | D | L | Pts |
|---|---|---|---|---|---|---|
| 1 | Belle Vue Aces | 28 | 23 | 0 | 5 | 46 |
| 2 | Cradley Heath Heathens | 28 | 20 | 0 | 8 | 40 |
| 3 | Ipswich Witches | 28 | 16 | 2 | 10 | 34 |
| 4 | Coventry Bees | 28 | 16 | 2 | 10 | 34 |
| 5 | Sheffield Tigers | 28 | 14 | 3 | 11 | 31 |
| 6 | Birmingham Brummies | 28 | 13 | 1 | 14 | 27 |
| 7 | Hackney Hawks | 28 | 12 | 3 | 13 | 27 |
| 8 | Swindon Robins | 28 | 13 | 1 | 14 | 27 |
| 9 | Reading Racers | 28 | 12 | 2 | 14 | 26 |
| 10 | Leicester Lions | 28 | 13 | 0 | 15 | 26 |
| 11 | Wimbledon Dons | 28 | 12 | 2 | 14 | 26 |
| 12 | Eastbourne Eagles | 28 | 11 | 3 | 14 | 25 |
| 13 | Halifax Dukes | 28 | 10 | 1 | 17 | 21 |
| 14 | King's Lynn Stars | 28 | 9 | 3 | 16 | 21 |
| 15 | Poole Pirates | 28 | 3 | 3 | 22 | 9 |

M = Matches; W = Wins; D = Draws; L = Losses; Pts = Total Points

== Fixtures and results ==
| Home \ Away | BV | BIR | COV | CH | EAS | HAC | HAL | IPS | KL | LEI | PP | RR | SHE | SWI | WIM |
|---|---|---|---|---|---|---|---|---|---|---|---|---|---|---|---|
| Belle Vue | | 45–33 | 45–33 | 48–30 | 48–30 | 53–25 | 52–26 | 37–41 | 50–28 | 53–25 | 44–34 | 52–26 | 40–38 | 56–21 | 53–25 |
| Birmingham | 38–40 | | 37–41 | 35–43 | 41–37 | 42–36 | 48–30 | 41–37 | 49–29 | 47–31 | 46–31 | 45–32 | 42–36 | 43–35 | 41–37 |
| Coventry | 38–40 | 33–45 | | 40–38 | 46–32 | 42–36 | 46–32 | 40–38 | 43–35 | 47–31 | 49–29 | 45–33 | 46–32 | 41–37 | 49–29 |
| Cradley Heath | 46–32 | 45–32 | 45–33 | | 49–29 | 48–30 | 46–32 | 40–37 | 46–32 | 47–31 | 45–33 | 40–38 | 50–28 | 49–29 | 48–29 |
| Eastbourne | 35–43 | 46–32 | 49–29 | 39–38 | | 38–40 | 43–35 | 39–39 | 45–33 | 50–28 | 54–24 | 45–33 | 39–39 | 44–34 | 51–27 |
| Hackney | 35–43 | 36–41 | 34–4 | 40–38 | 43–34 | | 49–29 | 42–36 | 45–33 | 41–37 | 42.5–35.5 | 42–36 | 47–31 | 47–31 | 39–39 |
| Halifax | 38–39 | 40–38 | 37–40 | 42–36 | 54–24 | 49–28 | | 38–40 | 51–27 | 54–24 | 45–33 | 46–32 | 39–39 | 36–41 | 56–22 |
| Ipswich | 36–42 | 42–36 | 37–41 | 40–38 | 40–38 | 38–40 | 46–32 | | 47–30 | 43–35 | 47–31 | 39–39 | 49–29 | 54–24 | 51.5–26.5 |
| King's Lynn | 35–42 | 44–34 | 39–39 | 30–48 | 42–36 | 39–39 | 44–34 | 41–37 | | 40–38 | 43–35 | 45–33 | 46–32 | 37–41 | 46–32 |
| Leicester | 41–37 | 49–29 | 42–36 | 41–37 | 48–30 | 43–35 | 38–40 | 38–40 | 45–32 | | 43–35 | 40–38 | 40–38 | 38–40 | 50–28 |
| Poole | 36–42 | 39–39 | 41–37 | 32–46 | 39–39 | 39–39 | 50–28 | 36–42 | 43–35 | 38–40 | | 38–40 | 38–40 | 35–43 | 37–41 |
| Reading | 38–40 | 42–36 | 47–30 | 32–46 | 41–37 | 43–35 | 49–29 | 37–41 | 44–34 | 41–37 | 55–23 | | 42–36 | 40–38 | 42–36 |
| Sheffield | 50–28 | 44–34 | 39–39 | 43–35 | 46–31 | 52–26 | 48–30 | 40–38 | 45–33 | 47–31 | 51–27 | 50–28 | | 41–37 | 47–31 |
| Swindon | 36–42 | 41–37 | 42–36 | 33–45 | 30–48 | 41–37 | 41–37 | 41–37 | 44–34 | 42–36 | 46–32 | 39–39 | 44–34 | | 36–42 |
| Wimbledon | 40–38 | 43–35 | 40–38 | 32–46 | 41–37 | 48–30 | 41–37 | 31–47 | 39–39 | 37–41 | 42–36 | 40–37 | 49–29 | 43–35 | |

Legend: Blue = home team win; Yellow = draw; Red = away team win.

== Top ten riders (league averages) ==
| | Rider | Nat | Team | C.M.A. |
|---|---|---|---|---|
| 1 | Kenny Carter | (England) | Halifax Dukes | 11.05 |
| 2 | Erik Gundersen | (Denmark) | Cradley Heathens | 10.75 |
| 3 | Hans Nielsen | (Denmark) | Birmingham Brummies | 10.49 |
| 4 | Bruce Penhall | (United States) | Cradley Heathens | 10.39 |
| 5 | Dennis Sigalos | (United States) | Ipswich Witches | 10.26 |
| 6 | Bobby Schwartz | (United States) | Reading Racers | 10.11 |
| 7 | Chris Morton | (England) | Belle Vue | 9.98 |
| 8 | Shawn Moran | (United States) | Sheffield Tigers | 9.98 |
| 9 | Kelly Moran | (United States) | Eastbourne Eagles | 9.97 |
| 10 | Billy Sanders | (Australia) | King's Lynn Stars | 9.93 |

== British League Knockout Cup ==
The 1982 Speedway Star British League Knockout Cup was the 44th edition of the Knockout Cup for tier one teams. Cradley Heath Heathens were the winners.

First round

| Date | Team one | Score | Team two |
|---|---|---|---|
| 08/06 | Leicester | 45-33 | Kings Lynn |
| 06/06 | Eastbourne | 46-32 | Swindon |
| 05/06 | Kings Lynn | 48-30 | Leicester |
| 29/05 | Halifax | 45-33 | Hackney |
| 28/05 | Hackney | 38-40 | Halifax |
| 28/05 | Ipswich | 46-31 | Coventry |
| 27/05 | Sheffield | 42-36 | Cradley Heath |
| 22/05 | Coventry | 40-38 | Ipswich |
| 22/05 | Cradley Heath | 43-35 | Sheffield |
| 22/05 | Swindon | 38-40 | Eastbourne |
| 17/05 | Reading | 38-40 | Belle Vue |
| 15/05 | Belle Vue | 57-18 | Reading |
| 12/05 | Poole | 44-34 | Birmingham |
| 30/04 | Birmingham | 48-30 | Poole |

Quarter-finals

| Date | Team one | Score | Team two |
|---|---|---|---|
| 19/08 | Wimbledon | 40-38 | Eastbourne |
| 09/08 | Cradley Heath | 41-37 | Ipswich |
| 01/08 | Eastbourne | 43-35 | Wimbledon |
| 29/07 | Ipswich | 38.5-39.5 | Cradley Heath |
| 19/07 | Birmingham | 43-35 | Kings Lynn |
| 17/07 | Kings Lynn | 43-35 | Birmingham |
| 11/07 | Halifax | 41-37 | Belle Vue |
| 10/07 | Belle Vue | 44-34 | Halifax |
| 25/09 | Kings Lynn | 42-36 | Birmingham |
| 13/09 | Birmingham | 40-38 | Kings Lynn |

Semi-finals

| Date | Team one | Score | Team two |
|---|---|---|---|
| 03/10 | Kings Lynn | 36-42 | Belle Vue |
| 02/10 | Belle Vue | 49-29 | Kings Lynn |
| 19/09 | Eastbourne | 41-36 | Cradley Heath |
| 18/09 | Cradley Heath | 48-30 | Eastbourne |

Final

First leg

23 October 1982

| Cradley Heath Erik Gundersen 15 Lance King 13 Phil Collins 7 Simon Wigg 5 Andy Reid 3 Alan Grahame 3 Wayne Jackson 0 | 46 - 32 | Belle Vue Aces Chris Morton 12 Peter Collins 6 Peter Ravn 6 Larry Ross 4 Louis Carr 2 Peter Carr 1 Jim McMillan 1 |

Dudley Wood Stadium

Second leg

30 October 1982

| Belle Vue Aces Chris Morton 10 Peter Collins 7 Peter Ravn 7 Larry Ross 6 Rod Hunter 6 Louis Carr 5 Andy Smith 2 | 43 - 35 | Cradley Heath Erik Gundersen 15 Lance King 8 Alan Grahame 8 Simon Wigg 2 Phil Collins 1 Andy Reid 1 |

Belle Vue Stadium

Cradley were declared Knockout Cup Champions, winning on aggregate 81-75.

== League Cup ==
The League Cup was split into North and South sections. The two-legged final was won by Cradley Heath Heathens beating Ipswich Witches in the final 83–73 on aggregate.

North Group

| Pos | Team | PL | W | D | L | Pts |
|---|---|---|---|---|---|---|
| 1 | Cradley Heathens | 12 | 8 | 2 | 2 | 18 |
| 2 | Coventry Bees | 12 | 9 | 0 | 3 | 18 |
| 3 | Belle Vue Aces | 12 | 6 | 2 | 4 | 14 |
| 4 | Halifax Dukes | 11 | 6 | 1 | 4 | 13 |
| 5 | Birmingham Brummies | 12 | 3 | 1 | 8 | 7 |
| 6 | Leicester Lions | 11 | 3 | 1 | 7 | 7 |
| 7 | Sheffield Tigers | 12 | 2 | 1 | 9 | 5 |

South Group

| Pos | Team | PL | W | D | L | Pts |
|---|---|---|---|---|---|---|
| 1 | Ipswich Witches | 14 | 12 | 0 | 2 | 24 |
| 2 | Eastbourne Eagles | 14 | 8 | 2 | 4 | 18 |
| 3 | Wimbledon Dons | 14 | 8 | 1 | 5 | 17 |
| 4 | Poole Pirates | 14 | 6 | 0 | 8 | 12 |
| 5 | Hackney Hawks | 14 | 6 | 0 | 8 | 12 |
| 6 | Reading Racers | 14 | 6 | 0 | 8 | 12 |
| 7 | King's Lynn Stars | 14 | 5 | 0 | 9 | 10 |
| 8 | Swindon Robins | 14 | 3 | 1 | 10 | 7 |

Final

| Date | Team one | Score | Team two |
|---|---|---|---|
| 19/06 | Cradley Heath | 42–36 | Ipswich |
| 24/06 | Ipswich | 37–41 | Cradley Heath |

North Group

| Home \ Away | BV | BIR | COV | CH | HAL | LEI | SHE |
|---|---|---|---|---|---|---|---|
| Belle Vue | | 45–33 | 49–29 | 37–41 | 46–32 | 43–35 | 44–34 |
| Birmingham | 38–40 | | 36–42 | 39–39 | 42–36 | 42–35 | 54–24 |
| Coventry | 44–34 | 46–32 | | 44–34 | 44–34 | 47–31 | 41–35 |
| Cradley | 42–36 | 41–37 | 34.5–43.5 | | 46–32 | 48–30 | 49–28 |
| Halifax | 45–33 | 51–26 | 46–32 | 39–39 | | 45–33 | 50–28 |
| Leicester | 39–39 | 41–37 | 40–38 | 35–43 | n–h | | 46–32 |
| Sheffield | 39–39 | 40–37 | 38–40 | 24–54 | 35–43 | 43–35 | |

Legend: Blue = home team win; Yellow = draw; Red = away team win.

South Group

| Home \ Away | EAS | HAC | IPS | KL | PP | REA | SWI | WIM |
|---|---|---|---|---|---|---|---|---|
| Eastbourne | | 40–38 | 33–45 | 51–27 | 46–32 | 44–34 | 49–29 | 39–39 |
| Hackney | 36–42 | | 42–35 | 44–34 | 45–32 | 46–32 | 48–30 | 38–40 |
| Ipswich | 44–32 | 54–24 | | 46–32 | 44–34 | 40–38 | 46–32 | 48–29 |
| King's Lynn | 38–40 | 45–33 | 38–40 | | 44–34 | 42–36 | 42–36 | 36–42 |
| Poole | 53–25 | 42–36 | 41–37 | 44–34 | | 48–30 | 37–41 | 45–33 |
| Reading | 37–41 | 43–35 | 38–40 | 40–38 | 44–34 | | 40–38 | 43–35 |
| Swindon | 39–39 | 37–41 | 35–43 | 38–40 | 46–32 | 39–38 | | 36–42 |
| Wimbledon | 44–34 | 43–35 | 38–40 | 47–31 | 44–34 | 38–40 | 46–32 | |

Legend: Blue = home team win; Yellow = draw; Red = away team win.

== Riders' Championship ==
Kenny Carter won the British League Riders' Championship for the second consecutive year, held at Hyde Road on 16 October.

| Pos. | Rider | Heat Scores | Total |
|---|---|---|---|
| 1 | (England) Kenny Carter | 3 3 3 3 3 | 15 |
| 2 | (United States) Shawn Moran | 2 3 3 3 3 | 14 |
| 3 | (Denmark) Hans Nielsen | 3 2 3 2 3 | 13 |
| 4 | (Denmark) Erik Gundersen | 2 3 2 0 3 | 10 |
| 5 | (United States) Bobby Schwartz | 3 1 2 2 1 | 9 |
| 6 | (England) Les Collins | 0 1 3 3 2 | 9 |
| 7 | (Sweden) Jan Andersson | 3 0 2 1 2 | 8 |
| 8 | (England) Steve Bastable | 2 3 1 1 0 | 7 |
| 9 | (Australia) Billy Sanders | 0 2 2 1 2 | 7 |
| 10 | (Denmark) Ole Olsen | 0 1 1 3 1 | 6 |
| 11 | (England) Chris Morton | 1 2 1 2 0 | 6 |
| 12 | (Denmark) Finn Thomsen | 1 1 0 2 1 | 5 |
| 13 | (United States) Dennis Sigalos | 2 0 r - | 4 |
| 14 | (England) Dave Jessup | 1 0 1 0 1 | 3 |
| 15 | (England) Gordon Kennett | 1 0 0 0 2 | 3 |
| 16 | (England) John Davis | 0 - - - - | 0 |
| 17 | (England) Andy Smith (res) | 0 0 1 0 - | 1 |
| 18 | (England) Lee Edwards (res) | 0 0 - - - | 0 |

- ef=engine failure, f=fell, x=excluded r-retired

== Final leading averages ==
| | Rider | Nat | Team | C.M.A. |
|---|---|---|---|---|
| 1 | Kenny Carter | (England) | Halifax | 11.03 |
| 2 | Bruce Penhall | (United States) | Cradley | 10.74 |
| =3 | Erik Gundersen | (Denmark) | Cradley | 10.18 |
| =3 | Chris Morton | (England) | Belle Vue | 10.18 |
| 5 | Dennis Sigalos | (United States) | Ipswich | 10.10 |
| 6 | Jan Andersson | (Sweden) | Reading | 9.96 |
| 7 | Hans Nielsen | (Denmark) | Birmingham | 9.89 |
| 8 | Bobby Schwartz | (United States) | Reading | 9.83 |
| 9 | Gordon Kennett | (England) | Eastbourne | 9.72 |
| 10 | Michael Lee | (England) | King's Lynn | 9.65 |

== Midland Cup ==
Coventry won the Midland Cup for the second consecutive year. The competition consisted of five teams.

First round

| Team one | Team two | Score |
|---|---|---|
| Swindon | Birmingham | 44–34, 41–37 |

Semi final round

| Team one | Team two | Score |
|---|---|---|
| Coventry | Leicester | 37–41, 44–34 |
| Cradley | Swindon | 49–29, 54–24 |

=== Final ===
First leg

4 October 1982

| Cradley Heath Erik Gundersen 15 Phil Collins 7 Lance King 6 Simon Wigg 6 Alan Grahame 5 Andy Reid 4 Bruce Penhall r/r | 43–35 | Coventry Tommy Knudsen 13 Gary Guglielmi 9 Ole Olsen 5 Mitch Shirra 3 Kevin Hawkins 2 Alf Busk 2 Charlie McKinna 1 |

Dudley Wood Stadium

Second leg

11 October 1982

| Coventry Mitch Shirra 12 Tommy Knudsen 11 Ole Olsen 11 Gary Guglielmi 5 Alf Busk 3 Kevin Hawkins 2 Charlie McKinna 0 | 44–34 | Cradley Heath Erik Gundersen 9 Simon Wigg 7 Lance King 5 Alan Grahame 5 Andy Reid 5 Phil Collins 3 Bruce Penhall r/r |

Brandon Stadium

Coventry won on aggregate 79–77

== Riders & final averages ==
Belle Vue

- (England) Chris Morton 10.18
- (New Zealand) Larry Ross 9.37
- (England) Peter Collins 8.78
- (England) Louis Carr 6.01
- (Denmark) Peter Ravn 5.65
- (Scotland) Jimmy McMillan 5.44
- (England) Peter Carr 4.98
- (England) Andy Smith 4.40

Birmingham

- (Denmark) Hans Nielsen 9.89
- (England) Andy Grahame 9.03
- (Finland) Ari Koponen 6.20
- (Czech Republic) Aleš Dryml Sr. 6.03
- (Denmark) John Eskildsen 6.03
- (Denmark) John Jorgensen 5.65
- (Czech Republic) Zdeněk Kudrna 5.23
- (England) Neil Evitts 5.03
- (Germany) Karl Maier 4.72
- (New Zealand) Bruce Cribb 3.56
- (Italy) Armando Dal Chiele 0.80

Coventry

- (Denmark) Tommy Knudsen 9.22
- (Denmark) Ole Olsen 9.09
- (New Zealand) Mitch Shirra 7.38
- (Australia) Gary Guglielmi 6.69
- (England) Kevin Hawkins 5.79
- (Denmark) Alf Busk 5.19
- (Denmark) Sam Nikolajsen 3.48
- (Scotland) Charlie McKinna 3.25

Cradley Heath

- (United States) Bruce Penhall 10.74
- (Denmark) Erik Gundersen 10.18
- (England) Alan Grahame 9.22
- (England) Phil Collins 7.29
- (England) Simon Wigg 6.67
- (United States) Lance King 6.30
- (England) Ian Gledhill 3.45
- (England) Andy Reid 3.02
- (England) Wayne Jackson 3.00
- (Czech Republic) Jan Verner 2.69
- (Australia) Bill Barrett 1.78

Eastbourne

- (England) Gordon Kennett 9.72
- (United States) Kelly Moran 9.62
- (United States) Ron Preston 9.18
- (England) Paul Woods 6.62
- (Sweden) Lillebror Johansson 3.55
- (England) Dave Kennett 3.55
- (Sweden) Lars Hammarberg 3.37
- (Sweden) Borge Ring 3.36
- (England) Keith Pritchard 3.27

Hackney

- (Denmark) Bo Petersen 9.38
- (Denmark) Finn Thomsen 7.29
- (Australia) John Titman 6.59
- (Czech Republic) Antonín Kasper Jr. 6.53
- (England) Sean Willmott 5.96
- (Denmark) Jens Rasmussen 5.53
- (England) Bob Garrad 4.00
- (England) Martin Hagon 3.52

Halifax

- (England) Kenny Carter 11.03
- (England) John Louis 7.52
- (England) Ian Cartwright 7.28
- (Australia) Merv Janke 6.39
- (England) Martin Dixon 5.51
- (England) Doug Wyer 5.36
- (Australia) Steve Baker 4.98
- (Australia) Rob Ashton 4.71
- (England) Rob Tate 0.80

Ipswich

- (United States) Dennis Sigalos 10.10
- (Denmark) Preben Eriksen 8.53
- (United States) John Cook 7.77
- (England) Kevin Jolly 6.98
- (England) Jeremy Doncaster 6.07
- (England) Nigel Flatman 5.79
- (England) Andy Hines 5.67
- (England) Mike Lanham 5.16
- (England) Carl Baldwin 4.40

King's Lynn

- (England) Michael Lee 9.65
- (Australia) Billy Sanders 9.09
- (Sweden) Richard Hellsen 7.00
- (England) Melvyn Taylor 5.78
- (England) Colin Richardson 4.90
- (England) Rob Hollingworth 4.04
- (Sweden) Peo Gudmundsson 3.00
- (England) Keven Dye 1.76
- (Czech Republic) Jiří Hnidak 1.58
- (England) Peter Framingham 0.44

Leicester

- (England) Les Collins 8.77
- (England) Neil Collins 7.07
- (Australia) Phil Herne 6.42
- (England) Joe Owen 5.93
- (England) Colin Cook 5.87
- (England) Mark Courtney 5.57
- (Denmark) Finn Jensen 5.41
- (Australia) Steve Regeling 5.09

Poole

- (England) John Davis 8.68
- (United States) Scott Autrey 8.13
- (England) Neil Middleditch 6.01
- (Czech Republic) Václav Verner 5.86
- (England) Kevin Smith 5.83
- (Australia) Danny Kennedy 5.30
- (Zimbabwe) Peter Prinsloo 4.49
- (Australia) Les Sawyer 4.20
- (England) Pete Ellams 3.29

Reading

- (Sweden) Jan Andersson 9.96
- (United States) Bobby Schwartz 9.83
- (United States) Steve Gresham 5.57
- (United States) Denny Pyeatt 5.28
- (Czech Republic) Jiří Štancl 5.23
- (England) Tim Hunt 5.08
- (England) Dave Trownson 4.66
- (England) Colin Ackroyd 4.00
- (England) John Grahame 3.87
- (Sweden) Uno Johansson 2.78

Sheffield

- (United States) Shawn Moran 9.55
- (New Zealand) David Bargh 6.84
- (England) Dave Morton 6.50
- (England) Reg Wilson 6.48
- (New Zealand) Wayne Brown 6.46
- (England) Phil White 5.57
- (Poland) Zenon Plech 4.95
- (Australia) Mark Fiora 3.82
- (Australia) Robbie Foy 1.71

Swindon

- (Australia) Phil Crump 9.47
- (England) Steve Bastable 7.58
- (Sweden) Bjorn Andersson 6.46
- (England) Malcolm Holloway 5.97
- (Zimbabwe) Mike Ferreira 5.26
- (Denmark) Steen Mastrup 5.19
- (England) Martin Yeates 4.18
- (England) Martin Hewlett 4.13
- (Czech Republic) Jan Verner 3.26

Wimbledon

- (England) Dave Jessup 8.77
- (England) Malcolm Simmons 8.75
- (Finland) Kai Niemi 8.04
- (Poland) Edward Jancarz 5.82
- (Sweden) Anders Eriksson 5.37
- (England) Roger Johns 5.37
- (United States) Brad Oxley 5.09
- (England) Richard Knight 4.08
- (England) Alan Mogridge 2.06

== See also ==
- List of United Kingdom Speedway League Champions
- Knockout Cup (speedway)
