= 1983 Overseas final =

Speedway competition in Manchester, England

1983 Overseas Final

Seasons
- ← 1982 1984 →

The 1983 Overseas Final was the third running of the Overseas Final as part of the qualification for the 1983 Speedway World Championship Final to be held in West Germany. The 1983 Final was run at the Belle Vue Stadium in Manchester, England, and was the second last qualifying round for Commonwealth and American riders.

The Top 10 riders qualified for the Intercontinental Final to be held at the White City Stadium in London. Manchester born Cradley Heathens rider Phil Collins won the Overseas Final.

== 1983 Overseas Final ==
- (United Kingdom) Manchester, Belle Vue Stadium
- Qualification: Top 10 plus 1 reserve to the Intercontinental Final in London

Pos.	Rider	Total
1	(England) Phil Collins	12
2	(England) Kenny Carter	11+2
3	(New Zealand) Mitch Shirra	11+2
4	(New Zealand) Larry Ross	10
5	(Australia) Billy Sanders	10
6	(United States) Dennis Sigalos	9
7	(England) Chris Morton	9
8	(England) Andy Grahame	9
9	(England) Michael Lee	8
10	(United States) Lance King	8
11	(United States) Shawn Moran	7
12	(England) Les Collins	6
13	(England) John Davis	4
14	(England) Peter Collins	3
15	(Australia) Glyn Taylor	2
16	(United States) Mike Faria	1

== See also ==
- Motorcycle Speedway
