= 1984 Overseas final =

1984 Overseas Final

Seasons
- ← 1983 1985 →

The 1984 Overseas Final was the fourth running of the Overseas Final as part of the qualification for the 1984 Speedway World Championship Final to be held at the Ullevi Stadium in Gothenburg, Sweden. The 1984 Final was run on 8 July at Belle Vue in Manchester, England, and was the second last qualifying round for Commonwealth and American riders.

The top 10 riders qualified for the Intercontinental Final to be held at the Speedway Center in Vojens, Denmark. Lance King became the first American rider to win the Overseas Final, winning with an unbeaten 15 point maximum.

In heat 4 Jeremy Doncaster lifted and crashed into Les Collins (actually running over his head). Doncaster was excluded and despite the crash Collins continued after receiving medical attention.

== 1984 Overseas Final ==
- 15 July
- (England) Manchester, Hyde Road
- Qualification: Top 10 plus 1 reserve to the Intercontinental Final in Vojens, Denmark

Pos.	Rider	Total
1	(United States) Lance King	15
2	(Australia) Phil Crump	12
3	(United States) Shawn Moran	11
4	(Australia) Billy Sanders	10
5	(New Zealand) Mitch Shirra	9
6	(England) Alan Grahame	9
7	(England) Kenny Carter	8
8	(New Zealand) Larry Ross	8
9	(England) Simon Wigg	8
10	(United States) Kelly Moran	6+3
11	(England) Les Collins	6+2
12	(England) Andy Grahame	6+1
13	(England) Jeremy Doncaster	5
14	(England) Dave Jessup	3
15	(United States) Bobby Schwartz	3
16	(England) Martin Yeates	2

== See also ==
- Motorcycle Speedway
