= 1985 Overseas final =

Speedway competition in Bradford, England

1985 Overseas Final

Seasons
- ← 1984 1986 →

The 1985 Overseas Final was the fifth running of the Overseas Final as part of the qualification for the 1985 Speedway World Championship Final, which like the Overseas Final was held at the Odsal Stadium in Bradford, England. The 1985 Final was run on 14 July and was the second last qualifying round for Commonwealth and American riders.

The Top 10 riders qualified for the Intercontinental Final to be held in Vetlanda, Sweden.

== 1985 Overseas Final ==
- 14 July
- (United Kingdom) Bradford, Odsal Stadium
- Qualification: Top 10 plus 1 reserve to the Intercontinental Final in Vetlanda, Sweden

Pos.	Rider	Total
1	(United States) Shawn Moran	14+3
2	(England) Kenny Carter	14+2
3	(United States) Lance King	12
4	(England) Andy Smith	11
5	(England) John Davis	11
6	(England) Kelvin Tatum	10
7	(United States) John Cook	8
8	(Australia) Phil Crump	8
9	(United States) Sam Ermolenko	7
10	(England) Phil Collins	6+3
11	(England) Chris Morton	6+2
12	(England) Neil Collins	5
13	(Australia) Stan Bear	5
14	(New Zealand) David Bargh	2
15	(United States) Rick Miller	1
16	(England) Les Collins	0

== See also ==
- Motorcycle Speedway
