= 1986 Overseas final =

1986 Overseas Final

Seasons
- ← 1985 1987 →

The 1986 Overseas Final was the sixth running of the Overseas Final as part of the qualification for the 1986 Speedway World Championship Final to be held in Chorzów, Poland. The 1986 Final was held at the Brandon Stadium in Coventry, England on 19 June and was the second last qualifying round for Commonwealth and American riders.

The Top 9 riders qualified for the Intercontinental Final to be held in Bradford, England.

== 1986 Overseas Final ==
- 19 June
- (United Kingdom) Coventry, Brandon Stadium
- Qualification: Top 9 plus 1 reserve to the Intercontinental Final in Bradford

Pos.	Rider	Total
1	(United States) Sam Ermolenko	14
2	(England) Jeremy Doncaster	12
3	(England) Neil Evitts	11
4	(England) Marvyn Cox	10
5	(England) Chris Morton	10
6	(New Zealand) Mitch Shirra	9
7	(England) Kelvin Tatum	9
8	(United States) Kelly Moran	8
9	(Australia) Steve Baker	7
10	(England) Paul Thorp	6
11	(Australia) Phil Crump	5
12	(United States) Bobby Schwartz	5
13	(New Zealand) Larry Ross	5
14	(United States) Rick Miller (Res)	5
15	(England) Malcolm Simmons	2
16	(United States) Lance King	1
17	(United States) Shawn Moran	0
18	(Australia) Steve Regeling (Res)	0

== Classification ==
Placing	Rider	Total	1	2	3	4	5	6	7	8	9	10	11	12	13	14	15	16	17	18	19	20	Pts	Pos	21
1	(United States) (7) Sam Ermolenko	14		3					3					3	3					2			14	1	
2	(England) (4) Jeremy Doncaster	12	3							3				1				2				3	12	2	
3	(England) (14) Neil Evitts	11				3		2					3		2							1	11	3	
4	(England) (1) Marvyn Cox	10	1				3				3				1				2				10	4	
5	(England) (2) Chris Morton	10	2					3				2				2				1			10	5	
6	(New Zealand) (8) Mitch Shirra	9		0						2			1			3			3				9	6	
7	(England) (12) Kelvin Tatum	9			2					1		3			X						3		9	7	
8	(United States) (15) Kelly Moran	8				2			2			1						3	0				8	8	
9	(Australia) (5) Steve Baker	7		2			2					0					3					0	7	9	
10	(England) (13) Paul Thorp	6				1	1							2		1					1		6	10	
11	(Australia) (10) Phil Crump	5			3			1						0			F		1				5	11	
12	(United States) (11) Bobby Schwartz	5			1				0		2					0						2	5	12	
13	(New Zealand) (3) Larry Ross	5	0						1				2				E				2		5	13	
14	(England) (6) Malcolm Simmons	2		1				0			1							0			0		2	14	
15	(United States) (9) Lance King	1			0		0						0					1		0			1	15	
16	(United States) (16) Shawn Moran	0				F				-	-						-			-			0	16	
R1	(United States) (R1) Rick Miller	5								0							2			3			5	R1	
R2	(Australia) (R2) Steve Regeling	0									F												0	R2	
Placing	Rider	Total	1	2	3	4	5	6	7	8	9	10	11	12	13	14	15	16	17	18	19	20	Pts	Pos	21

m - exclusion for exceeding two minute time allowance • t - exclusion for touching the tapes • x - other exclusion • e - retired or mechanical failure • f - fell • ns - non-starter • nc - non-classify

gate A - inside	gate B	gate C	gate D - outside

== See also ==
- Motorcycle Speedway
