= 1987 Overseas final =

1987 Overseas Final

Seasons
- ← 1986 1988 →

The 1987 Overseas Final was the seventh running of the Overseas Final as part of the qualification for the 1987 Speedway World Championship Final to be held in Amsterdam in the Netherlands. The 1987 Final was held at the Odsal Stadium in Bradford, England on 5 June and was the second last qualifying round for Commonwealth and American riders.

The Top 9 riders qualified for the Intercontinental Final to be held in Vojens, Denmark.

== 1987 Overseas Final ==
- 5 June
- (United Kingdom) Bradford, Odsal Stadium
- Qualification: Top 9 plus 1 reserve to the Intercontinental Final in Vojens, Denmark

Pos.	Rider	Total
1	(New Zealand) Mitch Shirra	12
2	(England) Jeremy Doncaster	11
3	(United States) Kelly Moran	10+3
4	(United States) Sam Ermolenko	10+2
5	(Australia) Steve Regeling	9
6	(England) Simon Cross	9
7	(England) Neil Evitts	8
8	(England) Marvyn Cox	8
9	(United States) John Cook	8
10	(England) Chris Morton	7+3
11	(England) Kelvin Tatum	7+2
12	(New Zealand) David Bargh	6
13	(United States) Robert Pfetzing	5
14	(United States) Mike Faria	5
15	(England) Paul Thorp	3
16	(England) Andrew Silver	2

== See also ==
- Motorcycle Speedway
