= 1983 Speedway World Team Cup =

24th edition of the annual motorcycle speedway World Cup competition

Seasons
- ← 1982 1984 →

The 1983 Speedway World Team Cup was the 24th edition of the FIM Speedway World Team Cup to determine the team world champions.

The final took place at the Vojens Speedway Center in Denmark. The host country Denmark won their third title.

== Qualification stage 1 ==
=== Commonwealth and Scandinavian rounds ===
- Commonwealth round (1st & 2nd to Intercontinental Final)
- (England) Smallmead Stadium, Reading
- 15 May
- Ref: Mr. J.M.Price (Eng)
- Att: 5,000
- Scandinavian round (1st & 2nd to Intercontinental Final)
- (Sweden) Gislaved Motorbana, Gislaved
- 15 May

Pos.	National team	Pts.	Riders
1st	United States	38	5.Bobby Schwartz - 7 (1,2,2,2); 6.Dennis Sigalos - 12 (3,3,3,3); 7.Shawn Moran - 10 (2,3,3,2); 8.Kelly Moran - 9 (2,2,3,2); 18.Lance King - NS
2nd	England	27	13.Peter Collins - 7 (2,1,1,3); 14.Kenny Carter - 8 (2,3,2,1); 15.Chris Morton - 6 (0,1,2,3); 16.Simon Wigg - 6 (0,-,3,3); 20.Dave Jessup - 0 (-,e,-,-)
3rd	New Zealand	20	9.Larry Ross - 6 (3,2,1,0); 10.Mitch Shirra - 8 (1,3,2,2); 11.David Bargh - 1 (0,0,0,1); 12.Ivan Mauger - 5 (3,2,0,0); 19.Alan Mason - NS
4	Australia	11	1.Billy Sanders - 6 (3,1,1,1); 2.Phil Crump - 2 (1,0,1,0); 3.John Titman - 2 (1,0,0,1); 4.Steve Regeling - 1 (0,1,0,-); 17.Rod Hunter - 0 (-,-,-,0)

Pos.	National team	Pts.	Riders
1st	Denmark	47	Erik Gundersen - 12; Hans Nielsen - 12; Ole Olsen - 12; Tommy Knudsen - 11
2nd	Sweden	24	Jan Andersson - 8 Tommy Nilsson - 7 Bjorn Andersson - 6 Hans Danielsson - 3 Lennart Bengtsson - 0
3rd	Finland	19	Kai Niemi - 8 Ari Koponen - 6 Pekka Hautamaki - 3 Hannu Lehtonen - 1 Olli Tyrväinen - 1
4	Norway	5	Dag Haaland - 3 Tormod Langli - 1 Roy Otto - 1 Jorn Haugvalstad - 0 Dagfinn Jorgensen - 0

=== Continental rounds ===
- Quarter final (1st & 2nd to Continental Semi-Final)
- (Hungary) Gázvezeték Street Sports Complex, Debrecen
- 16 May
- Quarter final (1st & 2nd to Continental Semi-Final)
- (Italy) Giavera del Montello Municipal Stadium, Treviso
- 15 May

Pos.	National team	Pts.	Riders
1st	Hungary	35	Zoltán Adorján - 11; Zoltan Hajdu - 11; Janos Oresko - 7 József Petrikovics - 3 Istvan Sziraczki - 3
2nd	Poland	30	Roman Jankowski - 12; Boleslaw Proch - 7 Zenon Plech - 6 Wojciech Żabiałowicz - 3 Edward Jancarz - 2
3rd	Bulgaria	22	Nikolai Manev - 8 Vesselin Markov - 8 Angel Eftimov - 4 Orlin Janakiev - 2
4	Austria	8	Walter Nebel - 3 Siegfried Eder - 2 Adi Funk - 2 Toni Pilotto - 1 Hubert Fischbacher - 0

Pos.	National team	Pts.	Riders
1st	Czechoslovakia	43	Aleš Dryml Sr. - 12; Petr Ondrašík - 8 Milan Špinka - 8 Jiří Štancl - 8 Emil Sova - 7
2nd	Italy	32	Ottaviano Righetto - 10; Armando Dal Chiele - 9 Gianni Famari - 7 Giovanni Brizzolari - 5 Valentino Furlanetto - 0
3rd	Netherlands	15	Henny Kroeze - 5 Henk Steman - 5 Wil Stroes - 3 Leo Bathoorn - 1 Anne Elzinga - 1
4	Yugoslavia	6	Albert Kocmut - 3 Krešo Omerzel - 2 Zvonko Pavlic - 1 Artur Horvat - 0 Joze Zibert - 0

Semi final

- 26 June
- (Czechoslovakia) Svítkov Stadium, Pardubice

Pos.	National team	Pts.	Riders
1st	Czechoslovakia	44	Aleš Dryml Sr. - 12; Jiří Štancl - 12; Václav Verner - 12; Antonín Kasper Jr. - 8
2nd	Poland	25	Roman Jankowski - 9 Edward Jancarz - 8 Andrzej Huszcza - 7 Jan Krzystyniak - 1 Bogusław Nowak - 1
3rd	Italy	15	Ottaviano Righetto - 6 Gianni Famari - 4 Armando Dal Chiele - 4 Valentino Furlanetto - 1 Mauro Ferraccioli - 0
4	Hungary	11	Zoltan Hajdu - 3 Zoltán Adorján - 3 Janos Oresko - 3 Ferenc Farkas - 1 Istvan Sziraczki - 1

== Qualification stage 2 ==
=== Intercontinental final ===
- (England) Wimbledon Stadium, London
- 26 June
- Ref: R.Randborg

Pos.	National team	Pts.	Riders
1st	Denmark	35	9.Ole Olsen - 1 (1,-,-,-); 10.Erik Gundersen - 12 (3,3,3,3); 11.Tommy Knudsen - 5 (0,1,2,2); 12.Hans Nielsen - 12 (3,3,3,3); 19.Finn Thomsen - 5 (-,2,1,2)
2nd	United States	31	5.Dennis Sigalos - 9 (2,1,3,3); 6.Bobby Schwartz - 6 (2,3,9,1); 7.Kelly Moran - 2 (2,f,-,-); 8.Shawn Moran - 10 (3,3,2,2); 18.Lance King - 4 (-,-,3,1)
3rd	England	26	1.Peter Collins - 0 (0,-,-,-); 2.Kenny Carter - 7 (2,2,1,2); 3.Chris Morton - 8 (3,2,2,1); 4.Simon Wigg - 3 (1,1,1,-); 17.Dave Jessup - 8 (-,2,2,3\1)
4	Sweden	4	13.Jan Andersson - 2 (1,1,0,0); 14.Lillebror Johansson - 0 (0,0,-,-); 15.Tommy Nilsson - 1 (0,0,1,0); 16.Pierre Brannefors - 1 (1,0,0,0); 20.Anders Eriksson - 0 (-,-,0,0)

=== Continental final ===
- (West Germany) Altes Stadion, Abensberg
- 10 July
- Att: 12,000

Pos.	National team	Pts.	Riders
1st	England	40	1.Peter Collins - 9 (3,3,3,e); 2.Kenny Carter - 12 (3,3,3,3); 3.Chris Morton - 5 (1,2,2,-); 4.Dave Jessup - 11 (3,3,2,3); 17.Les Collins - 3 (-,-,-,3)
2nd	Czechoslovakia	27	9.Antonín Kasper Jr. - 7 (2,2,3,-); 10.Jiří Štancl - 6 (f,1,3,2); 11.Aleš Dryml Sr.- 6 (3,1,1,1); 12.Václav Verner - 6 (2,1,1,2); 19.Petr Ondrašík - 2 (-,-,-,2)
3rd	West Germany	17	5.Egon Muller - 9 (1,3,2,3); 6.Karl Maier - 5 (2,0,2,1); 7.Josef Aigner - 3 (1,0,-,2); 8.Peter Würtele - 0 (x,0,f,0); 18.Stefan Deser - 0 (-,-,0,-)
4	Soviet Union	12	13.Anatoly Maksimov - NS; 14.Mikhail Starostin - 3 (0,2,1,0); 15.Rif Saitgareev - 1 (1,0,0,0); 16.Viktor Kuznetsov - 4 (2,1,0,1); 20.Valery Gordeev - 4 (0,2,1,1)

== World final ==
- (Denmark) Speedway Center, Vojens
- 12 August
- Att: 25,000
- Ref : Gunther Sorber (W.Ger)

Pos.	National team	Pts.	Riders
1st	Denmark	37	9.Ole Olsen - 7 (2,1,2,2); 10.Erik Gundersen - 12 (3,3,3,3); 11.Finn Thomsen - 0 (0,-,-,-); 12.Hans Nielsen - 11 (2,3,3,3); 19.Peter Ravn - 7 (-,1,3,3)
2nd	England	29	13.Kenny Carter - 8 (3,2,2,1); 14.Michael Lee - 11 (3,3,3,2); 15.Dave Jessup - 2 (e,-,-,2); 16.Chris Morton - 7 (1,2,2,2); 20.Peter Collins - 1 (-,1,0,-)
3rd	United States	27	1.Dennis Sigalos - 9 (2,2,2,3); 2.Bobby Schwartz - 6 (3,1,1,1); 3.Lance King - 6 (2,2,1,1); 4.Kelly Moran - 6 (1,3,1,1); 17.Rick Miller - NS
4	Czechoslovakia	3	5.Antonín Kasper Jr. - 0 (0,0,e,-); 6.Jiří Štancl - 2 (1,0,1,0); 7.Aleš Dryml Sr. - 0 (0,0,0,0); 8.Václav Verner - 1 (1,0,0,0); 18.Petr Ondrašík - 0 (-,-,-,0)

== See also ==
- 1983 Individual Speedway World Championship
- 1983 Speedway World Pairs Championship
