= Vojens Municipality =

Former municipality in Denmark

Coordinates: 55°15′N 9°19′E

Vojens Municipality (German: Woyens), was a municipality (Danish, kommune) in the former South Jutland County on the Jutland peninsula in south Denmark. The municipality, which existed from 1970 to 2006, covered an area of 298 km^{2} (115 sq mi), and had a total population of 16,792 (2005). Its last mayor was Nis Mikkelsen, a member of the Venstre (Liberal Party) political party.

The site of its municipal council was the town of Vojens.

The municipality was created in 1970 due to a kommunalreform ("Municipality Reform") that combined a number of existing parishes:

- Hammelev Parish
- Jegerup Parish
- Magstrup Parish
- Nustrup Parish
- Oksenvad Parish
- Skrydstrup Parish
- Sommersted Parish
- Vedsted Parish
- Vojens Parish

On 1 January 2007 Vojens municipality ceased to exist, as the result of Kommunalreformen ("The Municipality Reform" of 2007). It merged with existing Gram and Haderslev municipalities, as well as Bjerning, Hjerndrup, Fjelstrup and Bevtoft parishes of Christiansfeld municipality to form the new Haderslev municipality.
