= Mikael Blixt =

Swedish speedway rider (born 1964)

- Born: 8 August 1964 (age 62); Nyköping, Sweden
- Nationality: Swedish

Career history

Sweden
- 1980–1987, 1996: Vargarna
- 1988–1989, 1991–1992: Indianerna

Great Britain
- 1982: Poole Pirates
- 1991: Peterborough Panthers
- 1991: Berwick Bandits

Individual honours
- 1991: Speedway World Championship reserve
- 1985: Swedish U21 champion

Team honours
- 1991: Elitserien champion
- 1983: Allsvenskan Div 1 (South) Champion
- 1981: Allsvenskan Div 2 (South) Champion
- 1996: Allsvenskan Div 1 (A) Champion

Mikael Blixt (born 8 August 1964) is a former speedway rider from Sweden. He earned 18 caps for the Sweden national speedway team.

== Speedway career ==
Blixt rode in the top tier of British Speedway during the 1982 British League season, riding for the Poole Pirates. He returned nine years later to compete in the 1991 British League season for the Berwick Bandits and Peterborough Panthers. In the Swedish Speedway Team Championship, he rode for Indianerna.

Blixt stood as reserve for the final of the Speedway World Championship in the 1991 Individual Speedway World Championship following a successful qualification through the Nordic final and his high placing in the World semi final.

Blixt won the silver medal in 1989 at the Swedish Championship.
