= Anders Eriksson (speedway rider) =

Swedish speedway rider

- Born: 6 April 1960; Nässjö, Sweden
- Died: 2002 (aged 41–42)
- Nationality: Swedish

Career history

Sweden
- 1979–1980: Njudungarna
- 1981–1983: Lejonen

Great Britain
- 1981–1982: Wimbledon Dons
- 1983: Eastbourne Eagles

Individual honours
- 1981: Swedish U21 Championship silver medal

Anders Eriksson (6 April 1960 – 2002) was a motorcycle speedway rider from Sweden. He earned eight caps for the Sweden national speedway team.

== Career ==
Eriksson came to prominence after reaching two finals of the Speedway Under-21 World Championship, in 1979 and 1981 respectively.

Eriksson made his British leagues debut in 1981, when he joined Wimbledon Dons for the 1981 British League season. In addition to reaching the World U21 final, he also won the silver medal in the Swedish Junior Speedway Championship.

In 1981, Eriksson continued to ride for Wimbledon and improved his average. The following season, he moved to ride for the Eastbourne Eagles during the 1982 British League season.

Also in 1982, Eriksson represented the Sweden national speedway team during the 1982 Speedway World Team Cup. The following season, he rode again for Sweden in the 1983 Speedway World Team Cup
