= Rick Miller (speedway rider) =

American speedway rider

- Born: 12 January 1961 (age 65); Reseda, California
- Nationality: American

Career history

Great Britain
- 1983–1992: Coventry Bees

Sweden
- 1990–1992: Örnarna

Individual honours
- 1982: Ventura track championship
- 1982: US Open National Champion
- 1986: West End International winner
- 1991: American Final winner

Team honours
- 1990: World Team Cup
- 1985, 1987: British League Cup
- 1986: Premiership Trophy
- 1987, 1988: British League Champion
- 1992: Elitserien Champion

Richard Leonard Miller (born 12 January 1961) is a former American international motorcycle speedway rider, and an automotive and motorcycle stuntman. He earned 34 caps for the United States national speedway team.

== Career ==
Miller won two national BMX titles as a Webco-sponsored rider in his early teens. Miller then rode motocross in the southern California area before switching to Speedway. Miller started his speedway career in 1981, became pro the next year and won rookie of the year. Speedway credits for 1982 include the Ventura track championship and the US Open National Championship in Owego, New York.

In 1986, Miller won the inaugural West End Speedway International at the Wayville Showground in Adelaide, South Australia. He would come back a year later and finish third at Wayville behind 1986 World Champion Hans Nielsen and Tommy Knudsen (both from Denmark).

Miller was also a frequent member of the USA speedway team in the World Team Cup, finishing third in 1983 in Vojens, Denmark, second in the three round 1986 series, third in the 1987 series held again over three rounds, second in 1988 at the Veterans Memorial Stadium in Long Beach, fourth in 1989 at the Odsal Stadium in Bradford, England, before finally becoming a World Champion by winning the 1990 Speedway World Team Cup in Pardubice, Czechoslovakia alongside Kelly Moran, Sam Ermolenko, Shawn Moran and Billy Hamill. Miller's last appearance in the World Team Cup Final was in 1991 in Vojens, helping Team USA to third place where he scored four points as the team reserve.

Miller rode in two Individual World Finals during his career. His first World Final appearance came at the Odsal Stadium in 1990 where he finished in ninth place with seven points from his five rides. His second and last World Final came in 1992 at the Olympic Stadium in Wrocław, Poland where he finished a disappointing 11th after scoring six points.

Miller rode in the United Kingdom for the Coventry Bees from 1983 to 1992, and was honoured with a testimonial in 1992. The Bees won two league titles in 1987 and 1988, going undefeated in the 1987 season, a feat never done before or since. Miller also rode for the Örnarna Eagles in Mariestad, Sweden, and helped them in winning the 1992 Elitserien Championship. He also rode for Polish 2nd Division club Polonia Bydgoszcz.

Miller retired from speedway at the end of the 1992 season and started a new career as a stuntman.

Miller was stunt double for Ryan Gosling in The Place Beyond the Pines, and has worked as a stuntman in over fifty feature films.

== World Final appearances ==
=== Individual World Championship ===
- 1990 - (England) Bradford, Odsal Stadium - 9th - 7pts
- 1992 - (Poland) Wrocław, Olympic Stadium - 11th - 6pts

=== World Team Cup ===
- 1983 - (Denmark) Vojens, Speedway Center - 3rd - 27pts (0 - Reserve)
- 1986 - (Sweden) Gothenburg, Ullevi, (Denmark) Vojens, Speedway Center and (England) Bradford, Odsal Stadium (with Bobby Schwartz / Sam Ermolenko / Lance King / Shawn Moran) - 2nd - 76pts (2)
- 1987 - (Denmark) Fredericia, Fredericia Speedway, (England) Coventry, Brandon Stadium and (Czech Republic) Prague, Marketa Stadium (with Shawn Moran / Sam Ermolenko / Lance King / Kelly Moran / John Cook) - 3rd - 93pts (22)
- 1988 - (United States) Long Beach, Veterans Memorial Stadium (with Sam Ermolenko / Lance King / Shawn Moran / Kelly Moran) - 2nd - 32pts (0)
- 1989 - (England) Bradford, Odsal Stadium (with Kelly Moran / Greg Hancock / Ronnie Correy / Lance King) - 4th - 8pts (0)
- 1990 - (Czech Republic) Pardubice, Svítkov Stadion - Winner - 37pts (0)
- 1991 - (Denmark) Vojens, Speedway Center - 3rd - 28pts (4 - Reserve)
