= Lance King (speedway rider) =

American speedway rider

- Born: 13 August 1963 (age 63); Carson City, Nevada, United States

Career history
- 1982-1984: Cradley Heathens
- 1986, 1987: Bradford Dukes
- 1988, 1989: King's Lynn Stars

Individual honours
- 1984: World Championship bronze
- 1984: Overseas Champion
- 1983: Golden Hammer
- 1984: Midland Riders Champion

Team honours
- 1985: World Team Cup silver
- 1983, 1984: World Team Cup bronze
- 1983: British League Champion
- 1982, 1983: Knockout Cup winner
- 1982, 1984: British League Cup winner
- 1983, 1984: Midland Cup winner

Lance Alan King (born 13 August 1963) is a former speedway rider from the United States. He earned 47 international caps for the United States national speedway team.

== Speedway career ==
King first rode in the British leagues when he joined Cradley Heath Heathens for the 1982 British League season and won the British League Knockout Cup and league Cup in his first season with them. He improved his average to 8.74 the following season and helped Cradley win the league title and knockout cup double in addition to the Midland Cup.

King won bronze medals at both the 1983 and 1984 Speedway World Team Cup and a silver medal in 1985.

By the 1984 season, King was recognised as one of the world's leading riders, and his career peaked with him winning the 1984 Overseas Final on his way to a bronze medal in the 1984 Individual Speedway World Championship behind Erik Gundersen and Hans Nielsen. With Cradley, he won two more trophies, the League Cup and Midland Cup but was forced to leave the club at the end of the season because of the league's points limits rules.

King later rode for both Bradford Dukes and King's Lynn Stars from 1986 until 1989.

== World Final appearances ==
=== Individual World Championship ===
- 1983 - (Germany) Norden, Motodrom Halbemond - 12th - 4pts
- 1984 - (Sweden) Gothenburg, Ullevi - 3rd - 13pts + 2pts
- 1985 - (England) Bradford, Odsal Stadium - 11th - 6pts

=== World Team Cup ===
- 1983 - (Denmark) Vojens, Speedway Center (with Dennis Sigalos / Bobby Schwartz / Kelly Moran) – 3rd – 27pts (6)
- 1984 - (Poland) Leszno, Alfred Smoczyk Stadium (with Shawn Moran / Bobby Schwartz / Kelly Moran / John Cook) – 3rd – 20pts (5)
- 1985 - (United States) Long Beach, Veterans Memorial Stadium (with Shawn Moran / Bobby Schwartz / John Cook / Sam Ermolenko) – 2nd – 35pts (9)
- 1986 - (Sweden) Gothenburg, Ullevi, (Denmark) Vojens, Speedway Center and (England) Bradford, Odsal Stadium (with Bobby Schwartz / Sam Ermolenko / Rick Miller / Shawn Moran) - 2nd - 76pts (19)
- 1987 - (Denmark) Fredericia, Fredericia Speedway, (England) Coventry, Brandon Stadium (with Shawn Moran / Sam Ermolenko / Rick Miller / Kelly Moran) - 3rd - 93pts (8)
