= Martin Yeates =

British speedway rider

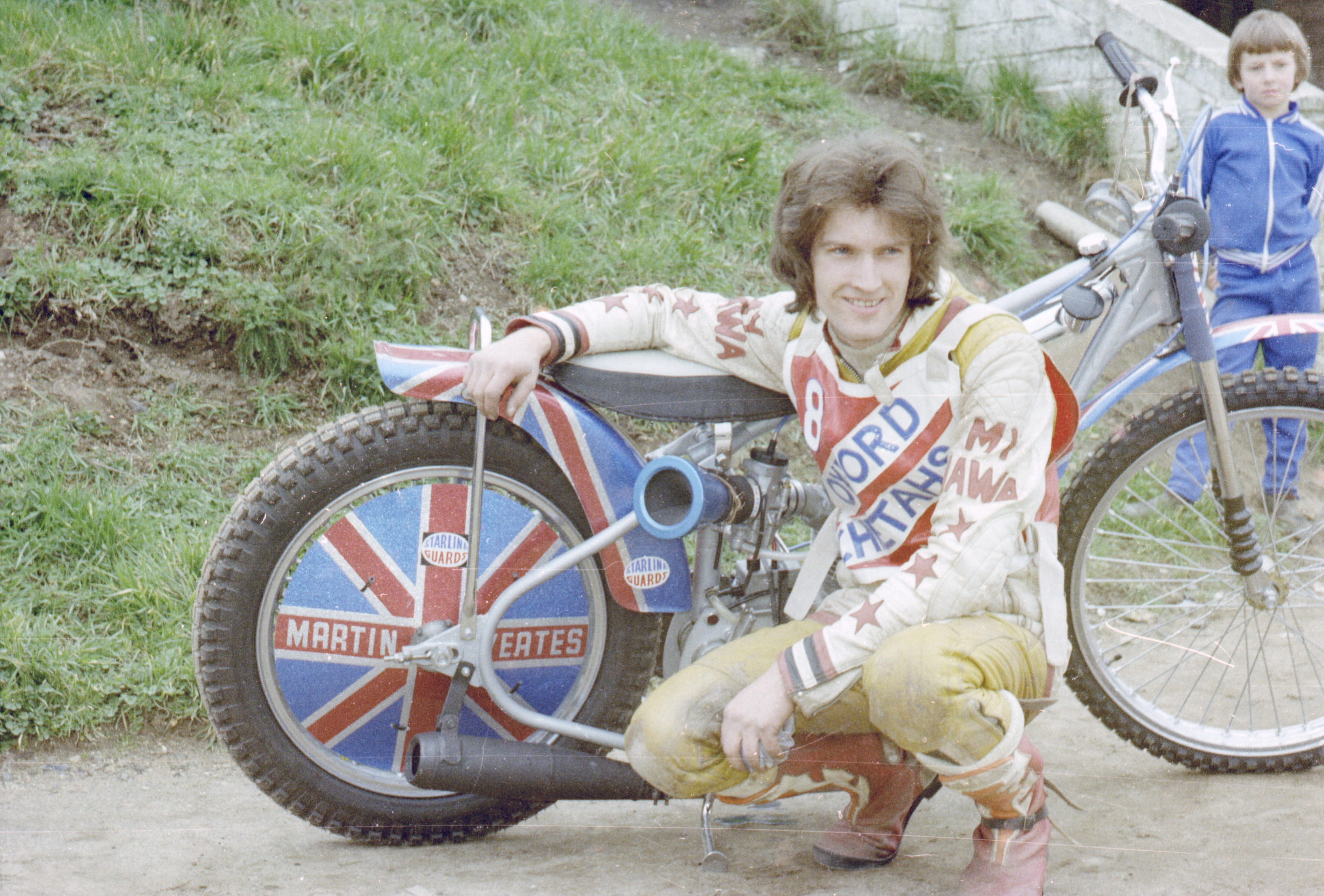
- Born: 24 November 1953 (age 72); Salisbury, England
- Nationality: British (English)

Career history
- 1972-1980: Poole Pirates
- 1973: Chesterton Potters
- 1973-1974: Eastbourne Eagles
- 1974: Oxford Rebels
- 1975-1976: Weymouth Wizards
- 1977, 1984: Oxford Cheetahs
- 1980-1984: Weymouth Wildcats
- 1980-1985: Swindon Robins
- 1985-1986: Poole Wildcats

Individual honours
- 1977, 1980: National League Riders' runner-up

Team honours
- 1982, 1983: National League Pairs Champion

Martin Yeates (born 24 November 1953 in Salisbury, England) is a former motorcycle speedway rider from England.

== Career ==
Yeates prominently rode for the Poole Pirates, Weymouth Wildcats and Oxford Cheetahs.

In 1980, Yeates signed for Weymouth from Poole for a National League record at the time of £7,000.

In 1982, Yeates won the National League Pairs, partnering Simon Wigg for Weymouth, during the 1982 National League season. The following season, he helped Weymouth retain the pairs title, but this time rode with Simon Cross.

In 1984, Yeates reached the 1984 Overseas final round of the Speedway World Championship, becoming the first National League rider to reach that stage.

Yeates' involvement with Speedway continued with association with Swindon Robins as Team Manager and Co-Promoter.

== Personal life ==
Retiring at the end of the 1987 season, Yeates set up his own business - Martin Yeates Caravans - just outside Salisbury, later renamed as Salisbury Caravan Centre.
