= Peter Würtele =

German speedway rider

- Born: 16 September 1959 (age 67); Memmingen, West Germany
- Nationality: German

Career history

Germany
- 1980–1982: Krumbach

Great Britain
- 1981: Reading Racers

Peter Würtele (born 16 September 1959) is a former motorcycle speedway rider from Germany. He earned six international caps for the West German national speedway team.

== Career ==
Würtele came to prominence when representing the West German national team during three consecutive World Cups in 1983, 1984 and 1985. He also appeared in the 1984 Speedway World Pairs Championship for West Germany.

Würtele started racing in the British leagues during the 1981 British League season, when riding for the Reading Racers.
