= Ventura Raceway =

Racetrack in Ventura, California

- Location: 10 West Harbor Blvd. Ventura, Ca. 93001
- Coordinates: 34°16′32″N 119°18′16″W
- Former names: Seaside Park Speedway
- Major events: Turkey Night Grand Prix

Oval Track
- Surface: Clay
- Length: 0.321 km (0.199 mi)
- Turns: 2
- Banking: High

Ventura Raceway is a 1/5 mile, high-banked clay oval racetrack located at the Ventura County Fairgrounds in Ventura, California, United States. On a weekly basis the track is home to many types of dirt track racecars including wingless sprint cars, midgets, dwarf cars, stock cars, modifieds, sport compacts, and karts. It is owned and operated by Jim Naylor and is also home to Cory Kruseman's Sprint Car Driving School and the Ventura Racing Association sprint cars.

== History ==
A 1/2 mile dirt oval operated at the fairgrounds from July 28, 1924 through around 1927 (this track had run motorcycles from 1910 through 1923). A 1/5 mile dirt oval was used for midgets on November 11, 1934.

A 1/10 mile dirt oval operated from July 4, 1978 through 1984 (this was originally used for speedway motorcycles beginning in 1969.) The 1/5 mile oval opened in 1985.

In the 1990s and into the 2000s motocross racing was held at Ventura Raceway on motocross tracks built on the infield of the oval track. These races were attend by local racers, as well as professionals such as off-road champion Jim Holley, Kyle Lewis, Randy Moody, and World Champion Bobby Moore.

The stadium was a significant venue for motorcycle speedway and hosted important events, including the American final of the Speedway World Championship in 1994.

A 1/5 mile dirt figure 8 was added in 2000.

The track has also operated as Seaside Park Speedway.

In 2010. Jim was inducted into the Ventura County Sports Hall of Fame for being the oldest and only successful professional sports franchise in Ventura County history.

Since 2016, it has served as the home of the Turkey Night Grand Prix, which draws professional drivers from around the world to compete in this prestigious event. Past winners for the event include Billy Boat (1997), Kyle Larson (2016, 2019 & 2023), Christopher Bell (2017 & 2018), Logan Seavey (2021), Justin Grant (2022), and Corey Day (2024 & 2025)..

Also since 2023, American Flat Track has run events in spring time.
