= Sean Willmott =

English speedway rider

- Born: 23 May 1961 (age 65); Bristol, England
- Nationality: British (English)

Career history
- 1977–1978: Weymouth Wizards/Wildcats
- 1977, 1985: Halifax Dukes
- 1979–1983: Hackney Hawks
- 1984: Exeter Falcons
- 1986–1988: Bradford Dukes

Individual honours
- 1983: British Championship finalist

Sean Willmott (born 23 May 1961) is a former speedway rider from England.

== Speedway career ==
Willmott rode in the top two tiers of British Speedway from 1977 to 1988, riding for various clubs.

Willmott started his career with Weymouth from 1977 to 1978 before joining Hackney Hawks in 1979. He spent five seasons with the London club, switching to Exeter Falcons in 1984. Willmott reached the final of the British Speedway Championship in 1983.

Willmott moved to join Halifax Dukes and then Bradford Dukes until his retirement after the 1988 season.
