= Kelly Moran (speedway rider) =

American speedway rider

- Born: September 21, 1960; Huntington Beach, California
- Died: April 4, 2010 (aged 49); Huntington Beach, California
- Nickname: JellyMan
- Nationality: American

Career history
- 1978–1979: Hull Vikings
- 1980: Birmingham Brummies
- 1981–1982: Eastbourne Eagles
- 1986–1988: Sheffield Tigers
- 1989–1992: Belle Vue Aces
- 1992: Swindon Robins

Individual honours
- 1983, 1984: North American Champion
- 1984: Ventura Raceway Track Champion
- 1985: Bruce Penhall Classic winner
- 1986: US Spring Classic Champion

Team honours
- 1982, 1990: Speedway World Team Cup
- 1984: US Pairs Champion

Kelly Michael Moran (September 21, 1960 – April 4, 2010) was an American professional speedway rider who earned 47 caps for the United States national speedway team. His younger brother Shawn Moran was also a successful speedway rider.

== Career ==
Moran was known as "Jelly Man" and "the Wizard of Balance" for the way he would hang off his machine when cornering. He arrived in England to race for Hull in 1978 as a teenager, but his season was curtailed when he crashed heavily at the Hackney Wick Stadium and suffered multiple injuries. However, the following year he qualified for his first World Championship Final at the Silesian Stadium in Poland. After finishing equal third with 11 points from his five rides (two wins, two seconds and a third), Moran was involved in a four-way run-off for third and fourth places with England's Michael Lee, Australian Billy Sanders, and defending champion Ole Olsen from Denmark. Lee won the run-off from Moran, Sanders and Olsen.

A dispute over terms saw Moran make a late start to his British season with Birmingham. But he was on the move again in 1981 when he joined the Eastbourne Eagles where he became a spectacular crowd pleaser. He then qualified for his second World Championship Final in 1982 where he again finished fourth, this time in front of his home crowd at the Los Angeles Memorial Coliseum.

Despite experiencing his best ever season in 1982, Moran decided to remain in California for the next three years. During this period he won back-to-back US National Championships in 1983 and 1984, and qualified for his third and last World Championship Final in 1984 at the Ullevi stadium in Gothenburg, Sweden. Once more he finished fourth with 11 points.

In 1986, Moran joined his younger brother Shawn at the Sheffield Tigers where he had three successful years and helped himself to 1012.5 points at an average of 8.88. He represented his country on several occasions and it was his partnership with Shawn that helped United States team to win the 1982 and 1990 Speedway World Team Cups.

Following Sheffield's closure, Moran moved to the Belle Vue Aces with his brother, where he remained until a dip in form saw him move from Belle Vue to Swindon early in 1992. A broken collar bone interrupted his spell at Swindon, but he struggled for form in a team that was rooted at the foot of the league. He retired from speedway at the end of the season, but he made a brief comeback in 2003 racing in North America. However, his comeback lasted just the one season.

== Death ==
Moran, a heavy cigarette smoker, died in his home town, Huntington Beach, California, on April 4, 2010, from complications of emphysema. He was 49 years old at the time of his passing.

A public memorial service was held for Moran on April 10, 2010, at his home track, the Costa Mesa Speedway in Los Angeles, organised by close friend and long time sponsor Peter Rovazzini of Rovazzini Electric. Among those who attended and gave speeches about Moran were Bruce Penhall, Bobby Schwartz, Dennis Sigalos, Ron Preston, John Cook, and Briggs. Condolence messages sent from Australian rider John Titman and 15 time World Champion Ivan Mauger were read out by those present.

== World Final appearances ==
=== Individual World Championship ===
- 1979 – (Poland) Chorzów, Silesian Stadium – 4th – 11pts + 2pts
- 1982 – (United States) Los Angeles, Memorial Coliseum – 4th – 11pts
- 1984 – (Sweden) Gothenburg, Ullevi – 4th – 11pts

=== World Pairs Championship ===
- 1986 - (West Germany) Pocking, Rottalstadion (with Sam Ermolenko) - 2nd - 46+4pts (23+4)
- 1987 - (Czechoslovakia) Pardubice, Svítkov Stadion (with Sam Ermolenko) - 3rd - 36pts (18)

=== World Team Cup ===
- 1982 - (England) London, White City Stadium (with Bruce Penhall / Bobby Schwartz / Shawn Moran / Scott Autrey) - Winner - 34pts (10)
- 1983 - (Denmark) Vojens, Speedway Center (with Dennis Sigalos / Lance King / Bobby Schwartz) – 3rd – 27pts (6)
- 1984 - (Poland) Leszno, Alfred Smoczyk Stadium (with Shawn Moran / Bobby Schwartz / Lance King / John Cook) – 3rd – 20pts (5)
- 1987 - (England) Coventry, Brandon Stadium and (Czech Republic) Prague, Marketa Stadium (with Shawn Moran / Sam Ermolenko / Lance King / Rick Miller / John Cook) - 3rd - 93pts (14)
- 1988 - (United States) Long Beach, Veterans Memorial Stadium (with Sam Ermolenko / Lance King / Shawn Moran / Rick Miller) - 2nd - 32pts (5)
- 1989 - (England) Bradford, Odsal Stadium (with Greg Hancock / Ronnie Correy / Rick Miller / Lance King) - 4th - 8pts (6)

== See also ==
- United States national speedway team
