= Kevin Smith (speedway rider) =

English speedway rider

- Born: 29 July 1961 (age 65); Canterbury, England
- Nationality: British (English)

Career history
- 1978: Weymouth Wildcats
- 1978–1980: Rye House Rockets
- 1979–1980: Hackney Hawks
- 1981–1987: Poole Pirates
- 1984, 1986: Swindon Robins
- 1985: Cradley Heathens

Individual honours
- 1981: British Championship finalist
- 1986: Poole Blue Riband

Team honours
- 1980: National League Champion
- 1979: National League KO Cup Winner

Kevin James Smith (born 29 July 1961) is a former motorcycle speedway rider from England. He earned three international caps for the England national speedway team.

== Speedway career ==
Smith began his league career riding as a 16-year-old for Weymouth Wildcats and Rye House Rockets.

Smith reached the final of the British Speedway Championship in 1981.

Smith rode in the top two tiers of British Speedway riding for various clubs, including Hackney Hawks, Poole Pirates, Swindon Robins and Cradley Heathens.

Arguably, Smiths best season was helping Rye House Rockets win the 1980 league title, when he also averaged 8.43 for the season.
