= Les Collins =

British motorcycle speedway rider

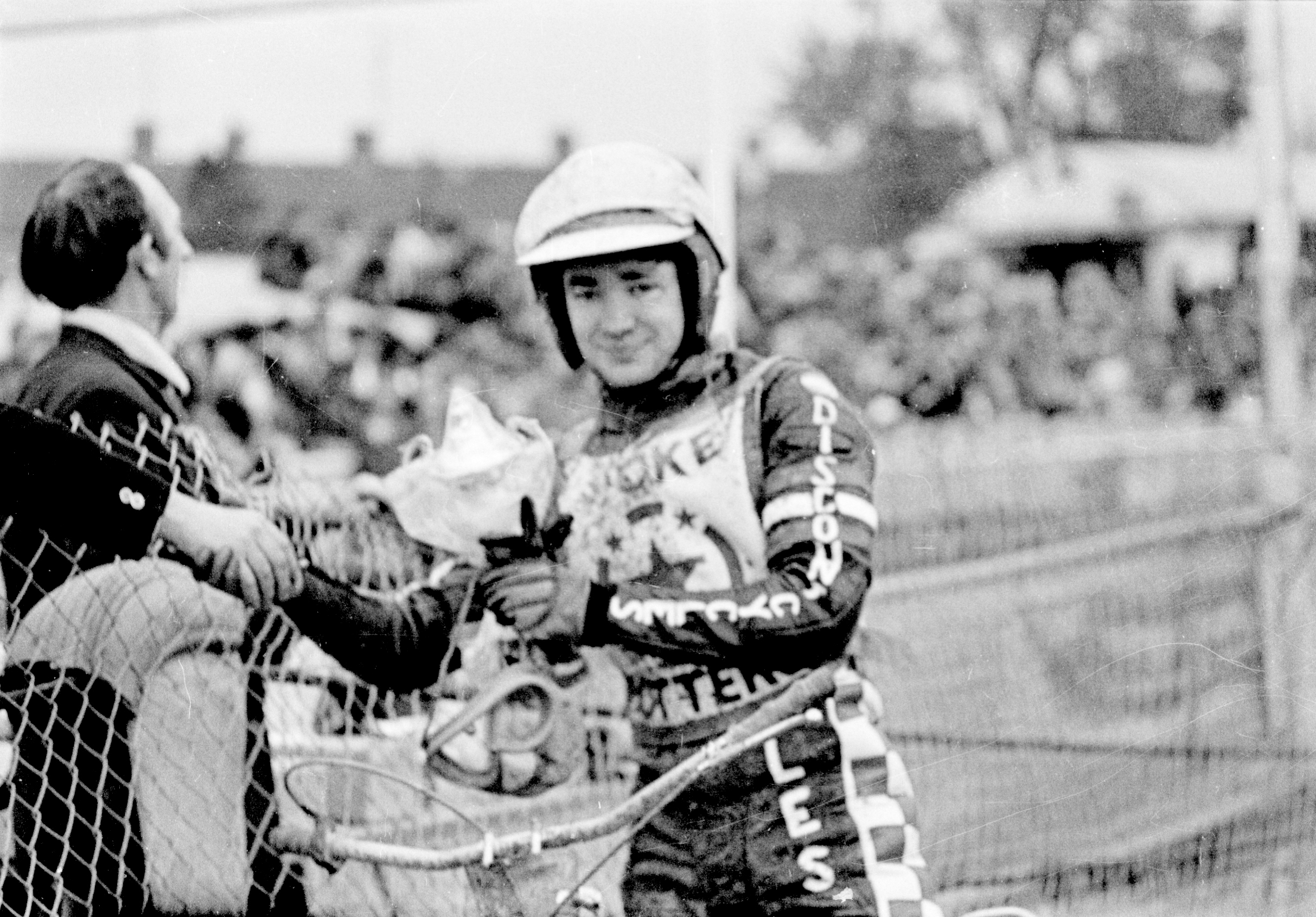
- Born: 24 May 1958 (age 68); Manchester, England
- Nationality: British (English)

Career history
- 1975: Crewe Kings
- 1975–1979, 1988: Belle Vue Aces
- 1976, 1997: Stoke Potters
- 1980–1983: Leicester Lions
- 1984–1986: Sheffield Tigers
- 1986, 1988: King's Lynn Stars
- 1986–1995: Edinburgh Monarchs
- 1996: Cradley/Stoke Heathens
- 1999–2001, 2003: Glasgow Tigers
- 2002: Workington Comets

Individual honours
- 1977: British Under-21 Champion
- 1980: British League Riders Champion
- 1982: Intercontinental Champion
- 1980: Olympique
- 1986: Scottish Open Champion
- 1983: Littlechild Trophy

Team honours
- 1977, 1978: Northern Trophy
- 1993: Fours Championship winner
- 1986: National League Pairs Champion

Leslie Collins (born 24 May 1958) is a former motorcycle speedway rider from England. He finished runner-up in the 1982 Speedway World Championship as well as winning the Intercontinental Final in 1982, the British Under-21 Championship in 1977 and the British League Riders' Championship in 1980. At retirement he had earned 31 international caps for the England national speedway team.

== Career ==
=== Crewe, Stoke & Belle Vue ===
Born in Manchester, England, Collins started his career with the Crewe Kings before moving Belle Vue Aces. He was loaned to the Stoke Potters in 1976 but in 1977 he made a place with the Aces his own, riding alongside brother Peter and family friend Chris Morton.

=== Leicester Lions & 1982 World Individual Final ===
Collins moved to the Leicester Lions in 1980 where he stayed until 1983. He won the British League Riders' Championship, held at Hyde Road on 18 October 1980.

During the 1982 season, Collins qualified for his first and only Speedway World Championship final, winning the Intercontinental Final title on the way. He finished runner-up that day, despite being the only rider to beat the eventual and defending champion, home town (Los Angeles) hero Bruce Penhall. The final was held at Los Angeles Memorial Coliseum.

An incident involving Penhall and the late Kenny Carter in heat 14 saw Carter excluded. Both riders were being beaten by Peter Collins at the point of the crash. Despite protests by Carter it was he who was excluded rather than Penhall; If Penhall had been excluded then the title may have headed in Les's direction, although that's a strange conclusion to come to given Carter had more points than Penhall at that stage, and would have been favourite to win a re-run Heat 14. Older brother Peter had been comfortably leading the race when Carter fell. Penhall won the re-run from Peter Collins and Australia's Phil Crump.

=== Sheffield & Edinburgh ===
In 1984, Collins moved to the Sheffield Tigers, still in the top flight British League. In 1986, he dropped down to the National League and signed for the Edinburgh Monarchs, where he rode for ten seasons. In his first season with the Monarchs he became National League Pairs champion with Doug Wyer, during the 1986 National League season.

In 1993, Collins helped Edinburgh win the Fours Championship during the 1993 British League Division Two season.

=== Cradley Heath, Stoke ===
1996 saw Collins riding in the top flight again, with the Cradley Heathens at Stoke followed by a year in the Premier League back with the Stoke Potters. Collins missed the whole of the 1998 season but in 1999 he returned to the sport with Edinburgh's rivals, the Glasgow Tigers.

=== Glasgow ===
It was at Glasgow in the 2001 and 2002 seasons Collins rode with his son Aidan. The 2002 team was unique as there was a second father and son connection. Former Leicester teammate Mark Courtney was also in the line-up with his son Scott.

Collins had a spell in 2002 with the Workington Comets but returned to Glasgow in 2003 where he was again ever present, as he was in 2000 and 2001.

== Family ==
Collins has four brothers all of whom were speedway riders, 1976 World Champion Peter, Phil, Neil and Stephen. His son Aidan and nephew Chris were also riders but have both retired from the sport.

== World Final Appearances ==
=== Individual World Championship ===
- 1982 - (United States) Los Angeles, Memorial Coliseum - 2nd - 13pts

=== Individual Under-21 World Championship ===
- 1977* - (Denmark) Vojens, Speedway Center - 3rd - 7pts

* Known as the European Under-21 Championship. Meeting declared after 12 heats due to rain.

== World Longtrack ==
Finalist

- 1983 (Czechoslovakia) Mariánské Lázně 3pts (15th)
- 1984 (West Germany) Herxheim 4pts (17th)

== European Grasstrack Championship ==
Finalist

- 1979 (Netherlands) Assen 11pts (7th)
- 1980 (West Germany) Bad Waldsee 15pts (5th)
