= Chris Morton =

English motorcycle speedway rider (born 1956)

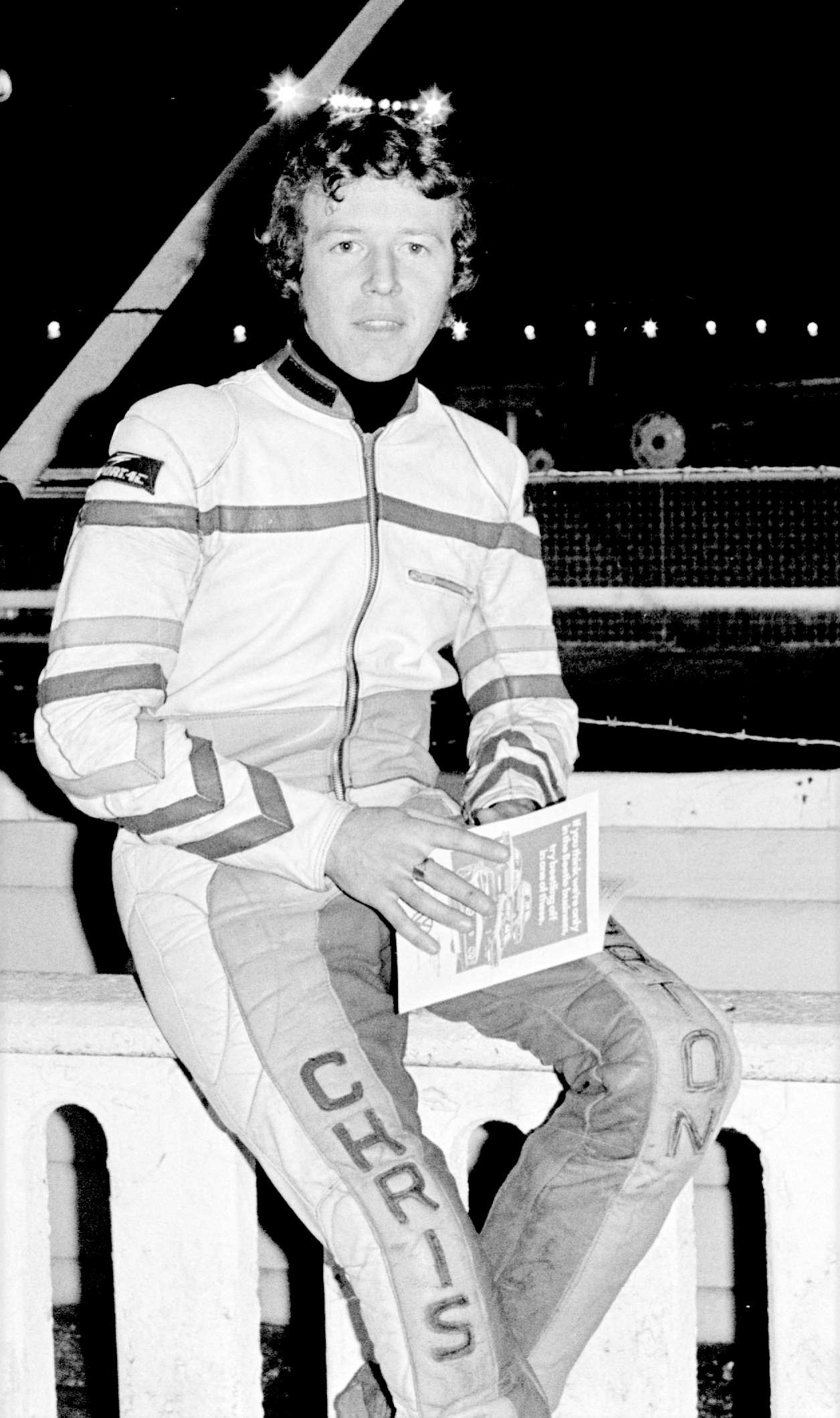
- Born: 22 July 1956 (age 70); Davyhulme, England
- Nationality: British (English)

Career history
- 1973: Ellesmere Port Gunners
- 1973–1990: Belle Vue Aces
- 1993: Sheffield Tigers

Individual honours
- 1980: Intercontinental Champion
- 1983: British Champion
- 1983, 1987, 1993: Northern Riders Champion
- 1984: British League Riders' Champion
- 1974: British Under-21 Champion
- 1978: Volkswagen/Daily Mirror Grand Prix
- 1988: Ace of Aces Grasstrack Champion
- 1980: Manpower Trophy
- 1980: Daily Mirror Golden Hammer

Team honours
- 1973, 1975: British League KO Cup winner
- 1980: World Team Cup Winner
- 1982: British League Champion
- 1984: World Pairs Champion
- 1984: British League Pairs Champion
- 1975, 1976, 1977, 1978: Northern Trophy
- 1983: British League Cup Winner

Christopher John Morton, MBE (born 22 July 1956) is a former motorcycle speedway rider from England. He earned 115 international caps for the England national speedway team and 7 caps for the Great Britain team, making him the third most capped England & British rider of all-time.

== Career ==
Born in Davyhulme, Lancashire, he rode bikes from a young age at the farm of Peter Collins' parents. Morton made his debut for Ellesmere Port Gunners (on loan from Belle Vue Aces) on 15 May 1973. He showed rapid improvement then following an injury to Aces Captain Chris Pusey in June 1973 he was drafted into the Belle Vue team scoring six points on his debut in an away meeting at Cradley Heath. The following season, he became British Under-21 Champion at just 17 years of age.

During the late 1970s, Morton was a guest resident international rider at the famous Rowley Park Speedway in Adelaide, South Australia where he often rode against the likes of home town hero John Boulger and Mildura's Phil Crump.

Morton rode for the England team at test level and represented them in the World Team Cup, winning the competition in 1980.

Morton became British Champion in 1983 and World Pairs Champion with best friend Peter Collins in 1984.

Morton won the 1984 British League Riders' Championship, held at Hyde Road on 20 October.

Morton rode for Belle Vue for 18 seasons, starting for the 1973 British League season and ending after the 1990 British League season. During the 18 seasons he regularly averaged around the 10 point mark, including an impressive 10.30 and 10.31 in 1983 and 1984 respectively.

== After retirement ==
Morton retired from riding in 1990, leaving a legacy of being one of the most significant riders ever to ride for Belle Vue. In 1991, he became the manager of Berwick Bandits in 1991. He also played a major role in the introduction of speedway to Buxton in 1994.

In 2005, Morton returned to Belle Vue as commercial manager and then in December 2006, he was part of a consortium who bought the Aces and currently holds the position of Operations Director, having previously also acted as team manager.

Morton was awarded his MBE for services to speedway in 1992. In 2024, he was part of a team that undertook a marathon charity cycling ride for the Speedway Riders Benevolent Fund but was taken ill and required an emergency hernia operation.

== Family ==
Brother Dave was also a speedway rider.

== World Final Appearances ==
=== Individual World Championship ===
- 1976 - (Poland) Chorzów, Silesian Stadium - 11th - 6pts
- 1980 - (Sweden) Gothenburg, Ullevi - 9th - 8pts
- 1981 - (England) London, Wembley Stadium - 11th - 5pts
- 1983 - (West Germany) Norden, Motodrom Halbemond - 10th - 7pts
- 1986 - (Poland) Chorzów, Silesian Stadium - 9th - 8pts
- 1987 - (Netherlands) Amsterdam, Olympic Stadium - 13th - 9pts
- 1988 - (Denmark) Vojens, Speedway Center - 10th - 6pts

=== World Pairs Championship ===
- 1981 - (Poland) Chorzów, Silesian Stadium (with Dave Jessup) - 6th - 17pts (10)
- 1984 - (Italy) Lonigo, Santa Marina Stadium (with Peter Collins) - Winner - 27pts (14)

=== World Team Cup ===
- 1980 - (Poland) Wrocław, Olympic Stadium (with Michael Lee / Peter Collins / Dave Jessup) - Winner - 40pts (11)
- 1981 - (West Germany) Olching, Olching Speedwaybahn (with Dave Jessup / Kenny Carter / John Davis / Gordon Kennett) - 2nd - 29pts (11)
- 1983 - (Denmark) Vojens, Speedway Center (with Kenny Carter / Michael Lee / Dave Jessup / Peter Collins) - 2nd - 29pts (7)
- 1984 - (Poland) Leszno, Alfred Smoczyk Stadium (with Peter Collins / Simon Wigg / Phil Collins / Neil Collins) - 2nd - 24pts (4)
- 1986 - (Sweden) Gothenburg, Ullevi, (Denmark) Vojens, Speedway Center, (England) Bradford, Odsal Stadium (with Simon Wigg / Kelvin Tatum / Jeremy Doncaster / Neil Evitts / Marvyn Cox) - 3rd - 81pts (20)
- 1988 - (United States) Long Beach, Veterans Memorial Stadium (with Simon Wigg / Simon Cross / Kelvin Tatum / Gary Havelock) - 4th - 22pts (4)

== World Longtrack Championship ==
Finalist

- 1980 - (West Germany) Scheeßel 5pts (14th)
- 1982 - (Denmark) Esbjerg 4pts (14th)
- 1985 - (Denmark) Esbjerg 0pts (20th) Reserve
- 1987 - (West Germany) Muhldorf 2pts (17th)
- 1988 - (West Germany) Scheeßel 31pts (Third)
- 1989 - (Czechoslovakia) Marianske Lazne 8pts (15th)
