= Vojens =

Town in Denmark

- Town
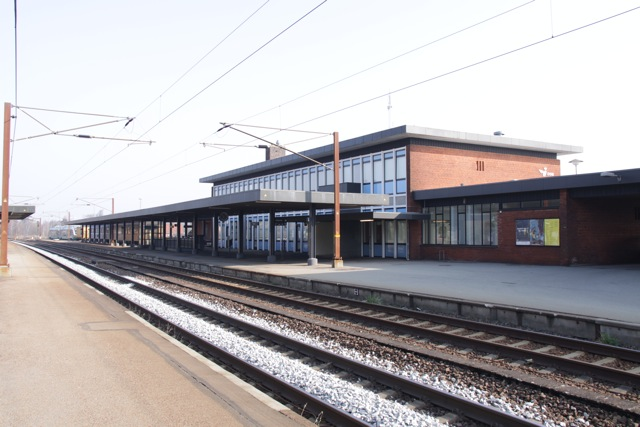
- Vojens railway station

- Location in Denmark Vojens (Region of Southern Denmark)
- Coordinates: 55°14′54″N 9°18′17″E
- Country: Denmark
- Region: Southern Denmark
- Municipality: Haderslev Municipality

Area
  - Urban: 6.41 km^{2} (2.47 sq mi)

Population (2026)
  - Urban: 7,387
  - Urban density: 1,150/km^{2} (2,980/sq mi)
  - Gender: 3,692 males and 3,732 females
- Time zone: UTC+1 (CET)
  - Summer (DST): UTC+2 (CEST)
- Postal code: DK-6500 Vojens

Vojens (German: Woyens) is a railway town in Denmark with a population of 7,387 (1 January 2026). It was the main town of the now abolished Vojens Municipality, now the second largest town of Haderslev Municipality in Region of Southern Denmark.

Vojens is located 41 km east of Ribe, 33 km south of Vejen, 29 km north of Aabenraa and 14 km west of Haderslev.

== Church ==
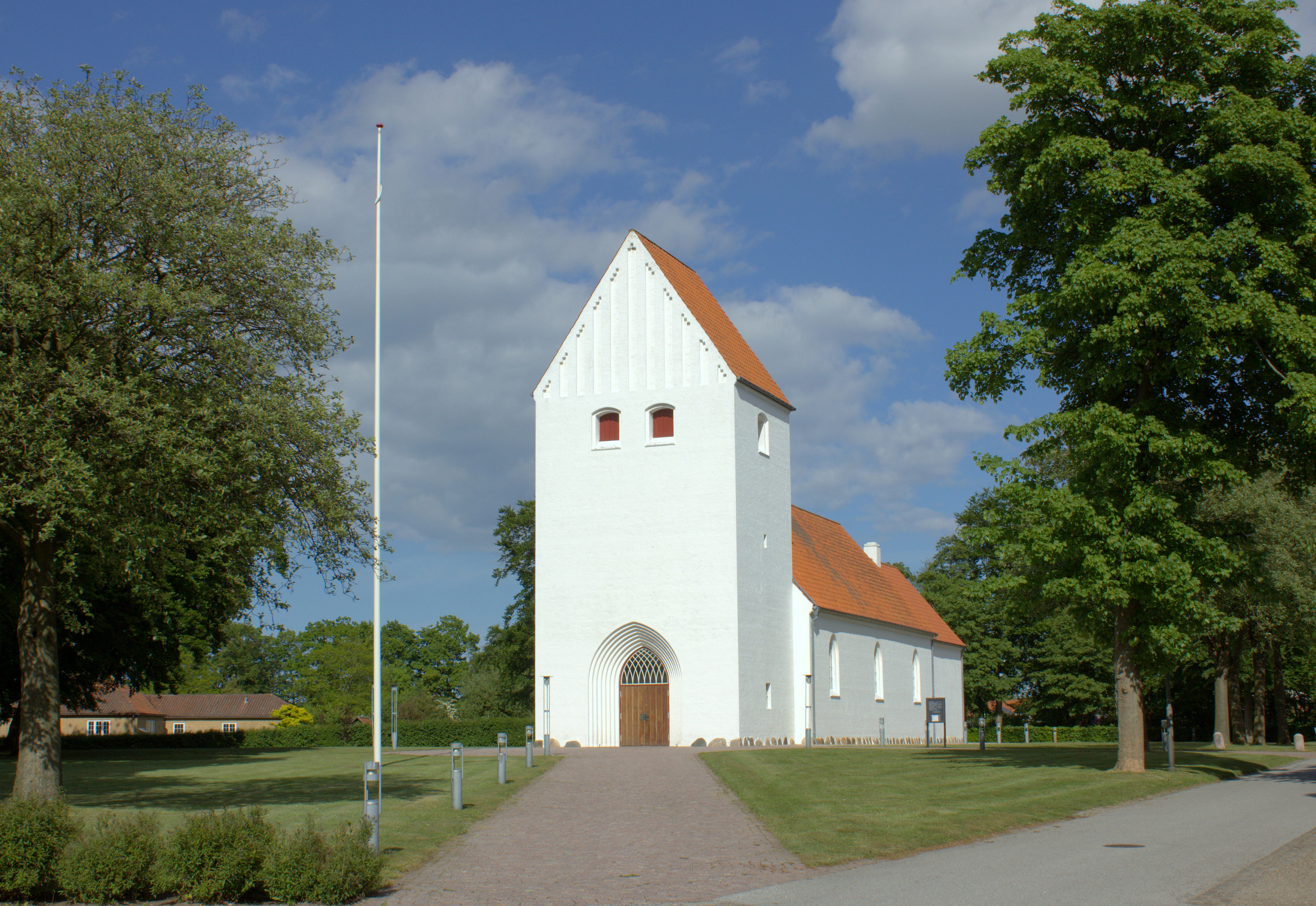
Vojens Church

Vojens Church is a reunion-church, from the beginning of the 1920s and was inaugurated on 6 September 1925. The church yard is older than the church and it was taken in use on 28 January 1878. In the middle of the churchyard, lies "the red chapel", which was built a few years after the churchyard was established and the chapel was taken in use in 1883.

== Transportation ==
Vojens is served by Vojens Airport and Vojens station on the Fredericia–Padborg railway line.

== Sport ==
=== Speedway ===
Vojens has a rich history in motorcycle speedway and hosted the World Final on two occasions (1988 and 1994) at the Vojens Speedway Center. The Speedway Center is part-owned by Denmark's first triple World Champion Ole Olsen, and has also hosted the Speedway Grand Prix of Denmark as part of the Speedway Grand Prix from 1995 to 2002 after which the SGP series moved the Danish GP to the Parken Stadium in Copenhagen.

The Vojens Speedway Center also hosted the Speedway World Team Cup final in 1983, 1986 (as Round 2 of a 3 Round Final), 1991 and 1998. The World Team Cup was replaced with the Speedway World Cup following 2000 and the Speedway Center hosted the 2003, 2008, 2010 and 2015 finals. Also held were the 1979 Speedway World Pairs Championship and the 1977 Under-21 European Championship. The Under-21 championship became the World Under-21 Championship in 1988 and Vojens hosted the 1999 Under-21 World Final.

== Climate ==
Climate data for Vojens Airport (1991–2020 normals, extremes 1961–2000)
Month	Jan	Feb	Mar	Apr	May	Jun	Jul	Aug	Sep	Oct	Nov	Dec	Year
Record high °C (°F)	11.2 (52.2)	12.7 (54.9)	19.7 (67.5)	25.7 (78.3)	27.0 (80.6)	30.3 (86.5)	31.6 (88.9)	33.3 (91.9)	27.2 (81.0)	24.0 (75.2)	17.3 (63.1)	11.9 (53.4)	33.3 (91.9)
Mean daily maximum °C (°F)	3.5 (38.3)	4.0 (39.2)	6.9 (44.4)	12.0 (53.6)	16.1 (61.0)	18.7 (65.7)	21.1 (70.0)	21.2 (70.2)	17.4 (63.3)	12.6 (54.7)	7.7 (45.9)	4.6 (40.3)	12.1 (53.9)
Daily mean °C (°F)	1.2 (34.2)	1.5 (34.7)	3.4 (38.1)	7.7 (45.9)	11.3 (52.3)	14.2 (57.6)	16.4 (61.5)	16.5 (61.7)	13.4 (56.1)	9.3 (48.7)	5.1 (41.2)	2.2 (36.0)	8.5 (47.3)
Mean daily minimum °C (°F)	−1.1 (30.0)	−1.0 (30.2)	0.0 (32.0)	3.4 (38.1)	6.5 (43.7)	9.8 (49.6)	11.8 (53.2)	11.8 (53.2)	9.4 (48.9)	6.0 (42.8)	2.5 (36.5)	−0.1 (31.8)	4.9 (40.8)
Record low °C (°F)	−21.0 (−5.8)	−24.0 (−11.2)	−16.0 (3.2)	−7.5 (18.5)	−4.2 (24.4)	−0.2 (31.6)	2.8 (37.0)	1.2 (34.2)	−2.3 (27.9)	−7.3 (18.9)	−19.0 (−2.2)	−21.0 (−5.8)	−24.0 (−11.2)
Average precipitation mm (inches)	69.6 (2.74)	46.8 (1.84)	56.3 (2.22)	42.5 (1.67)	52.7 (2.07)	68.7 (2.70)	71.2 (2.80)	75.3 (2.96)	87.1 (3.43)	93.9 (3.70)	87.8 (3.46)	77.5 (3.05)	829.3 (32.65)
Average precipitation days (≥ 0.1 mm)	19.1	14.4	17.1	14.0	12.7	13.7	15.1	14.7	16.9	18.0	19.8	19.9	195.3
Average snowy days	6.5	5.8	5.1	1.7	0.1	0.0	0.0	0.0	0.0	0.1	2.2	5.2	26.7
Source 1: DMI (precipitation and snow 1971–2000)
Source 2: IEM

== Notable people ==
- Hans Christian Schmidt (born 1953) a Danish politician and former Minister of Transport. A teacher by profession, he was the Danish Minister of Food from 2004 to 2007. Before that, he was the Minister for the Environment from 2001. He is a member of Venstre (the Danish Liberal Party). He is a longtime resident of the town of Vojens.
- George Galbraith (born 1955) a Canadian-born Danish former professional ice hockey goaltender. He played for Vojens IK and in the World Championships with the Denmark men's national ice hockey team in 1986 and 1994
- Kurt Thiim (born 1956 in Vojens) a Danish race car driver, he raced in single-seaters from 1978 to 1984
- Kim Lykkeskov (born 1983 in Vojens) a Danish professional ice hockey player who participated at the 2010 IIHF World Championship
