= 1997 Speedway Grand Prix Qualification =

The 1997 Speedway Grand Prix Qualification or GP Challenge was a series of motorcycle speedway meetings used to determine the 8 riders that qualified for the 1997 Speedway Grand Prix to join the other 8 riders that finished in the leading positions from the 1996 Speedway Grand Prix.

The format changed slightly in that four riders would qualify straight from the Intercontinental and Continental finals and four riders would qualify through the GP Challenge.

Simon Wigg won the GP Challenge.

== Format ==
- First Round - 5 riders each from Sweden & Denmark, 3 riders each from Finland & Norway to Scandinavian Final
- First Round - 32 riders from Continental quarter finals to Continental semi-finals
- First Round - 7 riders from British final to Overseas Final
- First Round - 5 riders from Australian/New Zealand final to Overseas Final
- First Round - 4 riders from United States final to Overseas Final
- Second Round - 8 riders from Scandinavian final to Intercontinental Final
- Second Round - 8 riders from Overseas final to Intercontinental Final
- Second Round - 16 riders from Continental semi-finals to Continental Final
- Third Round - 7 riders from positions 9-15 from the 1995 Grand Prix to GP Challenge
- Third Round - 2 riders from the Continental Final to 1997 Grand Prix and 4 to GP Challenge
- Third Round - 2 riders from the Intercontinental Final to 1997 Grand Prix and 5 to GP Challenge
- Final Round - 4 riders from the GP Challenge to the 1997 Grand Prix

== First round ==
=== Continental quarter finals ===
QF (4 May (France) Marmande)
Pos	Rider	Points
1	(England) Simon Wigg	15
2	(France) Philippe Bergé	13
3	(Russia) Sergej Darkin	12
4	(Poland) Piotr Protasiewicz	12
5	(Czech Republic) Zdeněk Schneiderwind	10
6	(Ukraine) Vladimir Trofimov	10
7	(Russia) Oleg Kurguskin	9
8	(Poland) Piotr Baron	7
9	(Slovenia) Gerhard Lekse	7
10	(Russia) Sergej Eroschin	6
11	(Czech Republic) Michal Makovský	6
12	(Slovenia) Izak Šantej	5
13	(France) Christophe Dubernard	4
14	(France) Frederick Brisseau	2
15	(Slovenia) Gregor Pintar	2
16	(Netherlands) Rob Steman	0

QF (5 May (Italy) Terenzano)
Pos	Rider	Points
1	(Hungary) Zoltán Adorján	15
2	(Italy) Stefano Alfonso	13
3	(Ukraine) Igor Marko	12
4	(Italy) Armando Castagna	11
5	(Italy) Valentino Furlanetto	10
6	(Germany) Robbie Kessler	10
7	(Hungary) Zsolt Benzce	9
8	(Czech Republic) Václav Milík Sr.	9
9	(Czech Republic) Robert Král	8
10	(Italy) Simone Tadiello	5
11	(Slovakia) Vladimir Visvader	5
12	(Italy) Alessandro Milanese	5
13	(Hungary) Zoltan Hajdu	4
14	(Austria) Franz Leitner	1
15	(Italy) Luca Taccini	1
16	(Slovakia) Gaspar Forgac	0

QF (5 May (Germany) Pfaffenhofen)
Pos	Rider	Points
1	(Germany) Gerd Riss	15
2	(Poland) Tomasz Bajerski	14
3	(Germany) Robert Barth	12
4	(Czech Republic) Tomáš Topinka	12
5	(Czech Republic) Antonín Šváb Jr.	11
6	(Poland) Piotr Świst	9
7	(Hungary) Sándor Tihanyi	9
8	(Germany) Mirko Wolter	8
9	(Austria) Andreas Bössner	7
10	(Italy) Andrea Maida	6
11	(Hungary) Robert Csilik	5
12	(Hungary) Róbert Nagy	5
13	(Bulgaria) Nikolaj Manev	4
14	(Austria) Walter Nebel	2
15	(Slovenia) Martin Peterca	2
16	(Slovakia) Jaroslav Gavenda	0

QF (5 May (Poland) Ostrów)
Pos	Rider	Points
1	(Czech Republic) Antonín Kasper Jr.	15
2	(Poland) Roman Jankowski	14
3	(Poland) Sławomir Drabik	12
4	(Poland) Jacek Krzyżaniak	11
5	(Russia) Rif Saitgareev	11
6	(Poland) Tomasz Gollob	11
7	(Russia) Rinat Mardanshin	9
8	(Hungary) Csaba Hell	9
9	(Latvia) Nikolaj Kokins	5
10	(Hungary) Norbert Magosi	5
11	(Germany) Tommy Dunker	4
12	(Russia) Grigorij Charchenko	4
13	(Latvia) Vladimir Voronkov	4
14	(Czech Republic) Petr Vandírek	2
15	(Germany) Jörg Pingel	2
16	(Ukraine) Vladimir Kolodij	0

== Second round ==
=== Overseas Final ===
3 riders to Intercontinental final+

+ Controversy over tyres at the final saw only 3 riders progress with an extra 5 places awarded in the Scandinavian final.

=== Scandinavian Final ===
13 riders to Intercontinental final

(9 Jun 1996 (Norway) Varhaug)
Pos	Rider	Points
1	(Sweden) Jimmy Nilsen	14
2	(Denmark) Brian Andersen	12
3	(Sweden) Mikael Karlsson	11
4	(Norway) Arnt Førland	10
5	(Denmark) John Jørgensen	10
6	(Denmark) Jan Stæchmann	10
7	(Denmark) Brian Karger	10
8	(Sweden) Stefan Dannö	9
9	(Sweden) Niklas Klingberg	9
10	(Denmark) Ronni Pedersen	7
11	(Norway) Rune Holta	4
12	(Finland) Vesa Ylinen	4
13	(Finland) Kai Laukkanen	4
14	(Norway) Lars Gunnestad	3
15	(Finland) Jarno Kosonen	2
16	(Norway) Björn Tönnesen	1
16	(Norway) John Pollestad	0

=== Continental semi finals ===
Continental semi-finals - 16 riders from to Continental final

SF

- 9 June 1996 (Russia) Togliatti

Pos.	Rider	Points
1	(Russia) Sergej Darkin	14
2	(England) Simon Wigg	13
3	(Italy) Armando Castagna	13
4	(Hungary) Zoltán Adorján	11
5	(Ukraine) Igor Marko	9
6	(France) Philippe Bergé	8
7	(Czech Republic) Zdeněk Schneiderwind	7
8	(Russia) Oleg Kurguskin	7
9	(Italy) Valentino Furlanetto	7
10	(Czech Republic) Václav Milík Sr.	6
11	(Italy) Stefano Alfonso	6
12	(Poland) Piotr Baron	5
13	(Germany) Robbie Kessler	4
14	(Ukraine) Vladimir Trofimov	4
15	(Poland) Piotr Protasiewicz	3
16	(Hungary) Zsolt Benzce	3

SF

- 9 June 1996 (Poland) Bydgoszcz

Pos.	Rider	Points
1	(Poland) Roman Jankowski	12
2	(Poland) Jacek Krzyżaniak	12
3	(Poland) Sławomir Drabik	12
4	(Poland) Tomasz Gollob	11
5	(Czech Republic) Tomáš Topinka	10
6	(Germany) Robert Barth	9
7	(Russia) Rinat Mardanshin	9
8	(Poland) Tomasz Bajerski	9
9	(Germany) Gerd Riss	8
10	(Czech Republic) Antonín Kasper Jr.	7
11	(Latvia) Nikolaj Kokins	5
12	(Poland) Piotr Świst	5
13	(Czech Republic) Antonín Šváb Jr.	5
14	(Hungary) Csaba Hell	3
15	(Hungary) Sándor Tihanyi	2
16	(Germany) Mirko Wolter	1

== Third round ==
- 7 riders from positions 9-15 from the 1996 Speedway Grand Prix to GP Challenge

=== Intercontinental Final ===
2 riders direct to Grand Prix, 5 riders to GP Challenge, Jimmy Nilsen won the event.

=== Continental Final ===
- 2 riders direct to Grand Prix, 4 riders to GP Challenge
- 28 July 1996 (Germany) Abensberg

Pos.	Rider	Points
1	(Poland) Tomasz Gollob	12
2	(Poland) Sławomir Drabik	11
3	(Hungary) Zoltán Adorján	11
4	(Germany) Robert Barth	11
5	(Russia) Rinat Mardanshin	11
6	(England) Simon Wigg	10
7	(Russia) Sergej Darkin	10
8	(Italy) Armando Castagna	9
9	(Czech Republic) Tomáš Topinka	9
10	(Poland) Jacek Krzyżaniak	6
11	(Poland) Tomasz Bajerski	5
12	(Russia) Oleg Kurguskin	5
13	(Czech Republic) Zdeněk Schneiderwind	3
14	(Czech Republic) Antonín Kasper Jr.	3
15	(Poland) Roman Jankowski	2
16	(France) Philippe Bergé	1
17	(Ukraine) Igor Marko	1
18	(Czech Republic) Václav Milík Sr.	1

== Final Round ==
=== GP Challenge ===
4 riders to 1997 Grand Prix

- 5 October 1996 (Czech Republic) Prague

Pos.	Rider	Points
1	(England) Simon Wigg	12
2	(Australia) Leigh Adams	12
3	(Sweden) Mikael Karlsson	11
4	(England) Andy Smith	11
5	(United States) Sam Ermolenko	11
6	(Australia) Jason Crump	11
7	(Australia) Ryan Sullivan	9
8	(Sweden) Stefan Dannö	9
9	(England) Joe Screen	9
10	(Denmark) Brian Karger	8
11	(Hungary) Zoltán Adorján	6
12	(Germany) Gerd Riss	4
13	(Germany) Robert Barth	4
14	(Australia) Craig Boyce	2
15	(Russia) Rinat Mardanshin	0
16	(Denmark) Tommy Knudsen	0
17	(Italy) Armando Castagna	0
