= 1998 Speedway Grand Prix Qualification =

The 1998 Speedway Grand Prix Qualification or GP Challenge was a series of motorcycle speedway meetings used to determine the 16 riders that qualified for the 1998 Speedway Grand Prix to join the other 8 riders that finished in the leading positions from the 1997 Speedway Grand Prix.

There was a late change to the qualifying when the Grand Prix increased to 24 permanent riders. Therefore 4 riders would qualify straight from the Intercontinental and Continental finals and 9 riders would qualify through the GP Challenge (originally just 4). The final 3 GP places would go to wildcards.

Piotr Protasiewicz won the GP Challenge.

== Format ==
- First Round - 5 riders each from Sweden & Denmark, 3 riders each from Finland & Norway to Scandinavian Final
- First Round - 32 riders from Continental quarter finals to Continental semi-finals
- First Round - 8 riders from British final to Overseas Final
- First Round - 4 riders from Australian/New Zealand final to Overseas Final
- First Round - 4 riders from United States final to Overseas Final
- Second Round - 8 riders from Scandinavian final to Intercontinental Final
- Second Round - 8 riders from Overseas final to Intercontinental Final
- Second Round - 16 riders from Continental semi-finals to Continental Final
- Third Round - 7 riders from positions 9-15 from the 1997 Grand Prix to GP Challenge
- Third Round - 2 riders from the Continental Final to 1998 Grand Prix and 4 to GP Challenge
- Third Round - 2 riders from the Intercontinental Final to 1998 Grand Prix and 5 to GP Challenge
- Final Round - 9 riders from the GP Challenge to the 1998 Grand Prix

== First round ==
=== Continental quarter finals ===
QF (1 May (Italy) Terenzano)
Pos	Rider	Points
1	(Italy) Armando Castagna	13
2	(Hungary) Zoltán Adorján	12
3	(Italy) Alessandro Dalla Valle	12
4	(Czech Republic) Zdenek Schneiderwind	11
5	(France) Christophe Dubernard	11
6	(Czech Republic) Antonín Kasper Jr.	10
7	(Italy) Andrea Maida	10
8	(Slovenia) Izak Šantej	8
9	(Netherlands) Maik Groen	6
10	(Hungary) Csaba Hell	5
11	(Russia) Sergej Eroschin	5
12	(France) Stéphane Trésarrieu	4
13	(Italy) Massimo Mora	4
14	(Russia) Oleg Kurguskin	4
15	(Austria) Thomas Stadler	3
16	(Austria) Helmut Lercher	2

QF (4 May (Poland) Częstochowa)
Pos	Rider	Points
1	(Poland) Sebastian Ułamek	14
2	(Poland) Dariusz Śledź	13
3	(Ukraine) Igor Marko	13
4	(Russia) Rinat Mardanshin	12
5	(Latvia) Nikolaj Kokins	11
6	(Czech Republic) Václav Milík Sr.	10
7	(Poland) Wieslaw Jagus	9
8	(Ukraine) Vladimir Trofimov	8
9	(Latvia) Vladimir Voronkov	7
10	(Estonia) Rene Aas	5
11	(Germany) Björn Danielczik	5
12	(Czech Republic) Michal Makovský	4
13	(Germany) Mirko Wolter	4
14	(Poland) Waldemar Walczak	3
15	(Russia) Grigorij Charchenko	1
16	(France) Frederic Brisseau	0
17	(Poland) Robert Jucha	0
18	(Poland) Artur Pietrzyk	0

QF (4 May (Slovenia) Ljubljana)
Pos	Rider	Points
1	(Poland) Robert Sawina	13
2	(Poland) Piotr Świst	13
3	(Germany) Robbie Kessler	12
4	(Austria) Andreas Bössner	11
5	(Slovenia) Matej Ferjan	11
6	(Bulgaria) Nikolaj Manev	9
7	(Slovenia) Gerhard Lekse	9
8	(Hungary) Norbert Magosi	8
9	(Argentina) Emiliano Sanchez	8
10	(Slovenia) Martin Peterca	7
11	(Hungary) Sándor Tihanyi	4
12	(Italy) Alessandro Milanese	4
13	(Ukraine) Alexander Liatosinski	4
14	(Croatia) Krunoslav Zganec	3
15	(Bulgaria) Milen Nikolajev	2
16	(Croatia) Renato Kuster	1

QF (19 May (Germany) Abensberg)
Pos	Rider	Points
1	(Germany) Gerd Riss	15
2	(Poland) Jacek Krzyżaniak	13
3	(Russia) Roman Povazhny	11
4	(Czech Republic) Tomáš Topinka	11
5	(Germany) Robert Barth	11
6	(Czech Republic) Bohumil Brhel	10
7	(Poland) Jacek Gollob	10
8	(Russia) Sergej Darkin	9
9	(Slovakia) Jaroslav Gavenda	8
10	(Hungary) Laszlo Bodi	7
11	(Austria) Heinrich Schatzer	4
12	(Hungary) Gabor Röth	4
13	(Slovakia) Vladimir Visvader	3
14	(Latvia) Alexander Biznia	3
15	(Italy) Simone Tadiello	1
16	(Netherlands) Patrik Verbrugge	0

== Second round ==
=== Overseas Final ===
8 riders to Intercontinental Final

=== Scandinavian Final ===
8 riders to Intercontinental final

(7 Jun 1997 (Finland) Hyvinkää)
Pos	Rider	Points
1	(Sweden) Peter Nahlin	12
2	(Denmark) Jesper B Jensen	12
3	(Sweden) Stefan Dannö	11
4	(Finland) Kai Laukkanen	10
5	(Denmark) Ronni Pedersen	10
6	(Denmark) John Jørgensen	10
7	(Denmark) Frede Schött	10
8	(Sweden) Stefan Andersson	9
9	(Norway) Rune Holta	8
10	(Sweden) Niklas Klingberg	8
11	(Denmark) Hans Clausen	6
12	(Norway) Lars Gunnestad	5
13	(Sweden) Niklas Karlsson	3
14	(Finland) Marko Hyyryläinen	2
15	(Norway) Kenneth Borgenhaug	2
16	(Finland) Jonas Kylmäkorpi	1

=== Continental semi finals ===
Continental semi-finals - 16 riders from to Continental final

SF

- 8 June 1997 (Austria) St. Johann im Pongau District

Pos.	Rider	Points
1	(Poland) Robert Sawina	14
2	(Czech Republic) Antonín Kasper Jr.	12
3	(Poland) Piotr Świst	12
4	(Austria) Andreas Bössner	10
5	(Hungary) Zoltán Adorján	10
6	(Germany) Robbie Kessler	10
7	(Italy) Armando Castagna	10
8	(Italy) Andrea Maida	8
9	(Czech Republic) Zdenek Schneiderwind	8
10	(Slovenia) Izak Šantej	7
11	(Slovenia) Matej Ferjan	5
12	(Italy) Alessandro Dalla Valle	4
13	(Hungary) Norbert Magosi	4
14	(Bulgaria) Nikolaj Manev	2
15	(France) Christophe Dubernard	2
16	(Slovenia) Gerhard Lekse	2

SF2

- 7 June 1997 (Germany) Pocking

Pos.	Rider	Points
1	(Poland) Jacek Gollob	14
2	(Czech Republic) Bohumil Brhel	12
3	(Czech Republic) Tomáš Topinka	11
4	(Russia) Roman Povazhny	10
5	(Poland) Jacek Krzyżaniak	10
6	(Russia) Rinat Mardanshin	10
7	(Germany) Robert Barth	9
8	(Poland) Sebastian Ułamek	9
9	(Russia) Sergej Darki	9
10	(Poland) Dariusz Śledź	7
11	(Germany) Gerd Riss	7
12	(Czech Republic) Václav Milík Sr.	5
13	(Czech Republic) Michal Makovský	4
14	(Russia) Vladimir Trofimov	2
15	(Germany) Björn Danielczik	1
16	(Ukraine) Igor Marko	0
17	(Slovakia) Jaroslav Gavenda (R)	0

== Third round ==
- 7 riders from positions 9-15 from the 1997 Speedway Grand Prix to GP Challenge

=== Intercontinental Final ===
2 riders direct to Grand Prix, 5 riders to GP Challenge

=== Continental Final ===
- 2 riders direct to Grand Prix, 4 riders to GP Challenge
- 26 July 1997 (Italy) Lonigo

Pos.	Rider	Points
1	(Italy) Armando Castagna	13
2	(Hungary) Zoltán Adorján	12
3	(Czech Republic) Tomáš Topinka	12
4	(Poland) Sebastian Ułamek	10
5	(Poland) Piotr Świst	9
6	(Poland) Jacek Krzyżaniak	8
7	(Czech Republic) Antonín Kasper Jr.	8
8	(Russia) Roman Povazhny	8
9	(Poland) Jacek Gollob	8
10	(Russia) Rinat Mardanshin	6
11	(Czech Republic) Bohumil Brhel	6
12	(Italy) Andrea Maida	5
13	(Germany) Robbie Kessler	5
14	(Poland) Robert Sawina	5
15	(Austria) Andreas Bössner	4
16	(Czech Republic) Zdenek Schneiderwind	1
17	(Russia) Sergej Darkin	0

== Final Round ==
=== GP Challenge ===
4 riders (changed to 9) to 1998 Grand Prix

- 5 October 1997 (Austria) Wiener Neustadt

Pos.	Rider	Points
1	(Poland) Piotr Protasiewicz	14
2	(Sweden) Stefan Dannö	13
3	(Australia) Leigh Adams	12
4	(Australia) Craig Boyce	11
5	(England) Andy Smith	9
6	(England) Chris Louis	8
7	(Sweden) Henrik Gustafsson	7
8	(Sweden) Peter Karlsson	7
9	(Poland) Sebastian Ułamek	7
10	(United States) Sam Ermolenko	7
11	(Poland) Jacek Krzyżaniak	6
12	(Czech Republic) Tomáš Topinka	5
13	(Poland) Piotr Świst	5
14	(England) Joe Screen	4
15	(England) Kelvin Tatum	2
16	(Poland) Sławomir Drabik	1
17	(Denmark) Ronni Pedersen	1
