= 1997 Speedway Grand Prix of Sweden =

Speedway race

Information
- Date: 14 June 1997
- City: (Sweden) Linköping
- Event: 2 of 6 (14)
- Referee: (Germany) Wolfgang Glas

Stadium details
- Stadium: Motorstadium
- Track: speedway track

SGP Results
- Best Time
- (gold) Winner: (Poland) Tomasz Gollob
- (silver) Runner-up: (United States) Greg Hancock
- (bronze) 3rd place: (Sweden) Tony Rickardsson

The 1997 Speedway Grand Prix of Sweden was the second race of the 1997 Speedway Grand Prix season. It took place on 14 June in the Motorstadium in Linköping, Sweden It was the third Swedish SGP and was won by Polish rider Tomasz Gollob. It was the second win of his career.

== Starting positions draw ==
The Speedway Grand Prix Commission nominated Jason Crump from Australia as Wild Card.

== Heat details ==
Placing	Draw	Rider	Total	1	2	3	4	5	6	7	8	9	10	11	12	13	14	15	16	17	18	19	20	Pts	Pos	21	22	23	24
1	10	(Poland) (13) Tomasz Gollob	25			3			3						3			3		1				13	1				3
2	5	(United States) (3) Greg Hancock	20		3			2					3					1					3	12	2				2
3	4	(Sweden) (4) Tony Rickardsson	18	2							3				2				2				2	11	4				1
4	8	(Denmark) (2) Hans Nielsen	16		1						2			3			3			3				12	3				0
5	11	(Denmark) (12) Brian Andersen	14			1				2		3					1						0	7	8			3
6	14	(United Kingdom) (7) Mark Loram	13				1		2					2		3							1	9	7			2
7	13	(United States) (1) Billy Hamill	12				3	3							0		2					3		11	5			1
8	1	(Sweden) (6) Peter Karlsson	11	3				1				2				2				2				10	6			0
9	12	(United Kingdom) (18) Andy Smith	9			E					1		2			1						2		6	9		3
10	2	(Australia) (16) Jason Crump	8	1					1				1				X				3			6	10		2
11	15	(Sweden) (11) Jimmy Nilsen	7				2			1			0						3	X				6	11		1
12	3	(Australia) (10) Leigh Adams	6	0						3				1				0				1		5	12		0
13	16	(United Kingdom) (8) Chris Louis	4				0				0	0						2			2			4	13	3
14	6	(Sweden) (5) Henrik Gustafsson	3		E				T			1							1			0		2	16	2
15	9	(Poland) (14) Sławomir Drabik	2			2		0						0					0		1			3	15	1
16	7	(Sweden) (17) Mikael Karlsson	1		2					0					1	0					X			3	16
17	17	(United Kingdom) (9) Simon Wigg	–																					-	17
18	18	(Poland) (15) Piotr Protasiewicz	–																					-	18
Placing	Draw	Rider	Total	1	2	3	4	5	6	7	8	9	10	11	12	13	14	15	16	17	18	19	20	Pts	Pos	21	22	23	24

Heat 21 (Final D): Riders placed 13th to 16th Heat 22 (Final C): Riders placed 9th to 12th	Heat 23 (Final B): Riders placed 5th to 8th Heat 24 (Final A): Riders placed 1st to 4th

gate A – inside	gate B	gate C	gate D – outside

== The intermediate classification ==
Qualifies for next season's Grand Prix series
Full-time Grand Prix rider
Wild card, track reserve or qualified reserve

Pos.	Rider	Points	CZE (Czech Republic)	SWE (Sweden)	GER (Germany)	GBR (United Kingdom)	POL (Poland)	DEN (Denmark)
1	(United States) (3) Greg Hancock	45	25	20				
2	(Poland) (13) Tomasz Gollob	43	18	25				
3	(United States) (1) Billy Hamill	32	20	12				
4	(Sweden) (4) Tony Rickardsson	29	11	18				
5	(Denmark) (2) Hans Nielsen	24	8	16				
6	(Denmark) (12) Brian Andersen	23	9	14				
7	(United Kingdom) (7) Mark Loram	20	7	13				
8	(Sweden) (11) Jimmy Nilsen	20	13	7				
9	(Poland) (14) Sławomir Drabik	18	16	2				
10	(Sweden) (5) Henrik Gustafsson	17	14	3				
11	(United Kingdom) (8) Chris Louis	16	12	4				
12	(Sweden) (6) Peter Karlsson	15	4	11				
13	(Australia) (10) Leigh Adams	12	6	6				
14	(United Kingdom) (18) Andy Smith	9	ns	9				
15	(Australia) (16) Jason Crump	8	–	8				
16	(United Kingdom) (9) Simon Wigg	3	3	ns				
17	(Czech Republic) (16) Tomáš Topinka	2	2	–				
18	(Poland) (15) Piotr Protasiewicz	1	1	ns				
19	(Sweden) (17) Mikael Karlsson	1	ns	1				
Pos.	Rider	Points	CZE (Czech Republic)	SWE (Sweden)	GER (Germany)	GBR (United Kingdom)	POL (Poland)	DEN (Denmark)

== See also ==
- Speedway Grand Prix
- List of Speedway Grand Prix riders
