= 1997 Speedway Grand Prix of Denmark =

Information
- Date: 23 September 1997
- City: (Denmark) Vojens
- Event: 6 of 6 (18)
- Referee: (Germany) Wolfgang Glas

Stadium details
- Stadium: Speedway Center
- Track: speedway track

SGP Results
- Best Time
- (gold) Winner: (United Kingdom) Mark Loram
- (silver) Runner-up: (Sweden) Tony Rickardsson
- (bronze) 3rd place: (United States) Greg Hancock

The 1997 Speedway Grand Prix of Denmark was the sixth and last race of the 1997 Speedway Grand Prix season. It took place on 23 September in the Speedway Center in Vojens, Denmark It was the third Danish SGP and was won by British rider Mark Loram. It was the first win of his career.

== Starting positions draw ==
The Speedway Grand Prix Commission nominated Jesper B. Jensen from Denmark as Wild Card.

== Heat details ==
Placing	Draw	Rider	Total	1	2	3	4	5	6	7	8	9	10	11	12	13	14	15	16	17	18	19	20	Pts	Pos	21	22	23	24
1	16	(United Kingdom) (7) Mark Loram	25				2				2	3						2			2			11	4				3
2	14	(Sweden) (4) Tony Rickardsson	20				3		3					0		2							3	11	3				2
3	12	(United States) (3) Greg Hancock	18			2					3		3			3						2		13	1				1
4	3	(Poland) (13) Tomasz Gollob	16	2						1				3				3				3		12	2				0
5	8	(United Kingdom) (8) Chris Louis	14		3						1			1			2			2				9	8			3
6	11	(United States) (1) Billy Hamill	13			1				2		2					3						2	10	7			2
7	7	(Denmark) (2) Hans Nielsen	12		2					3					2	0					3			10	5			1
8	9	(Sweden) (11) Jimmy Nilsen	11			3		1						2					3		1			10	6			0
9	15	(Australia) (10) Leigh Adams	9				0			0			2						2	3				7	10		3
10	1	(Denmark) (12) Brian Andersen	8	3				2				1				1				1				8	9		2
11	13	(Sweden) (6) Peter Karlsson	7				1	2							E		0					1		4	12		1
12	4	(United Kingdom) (18) Andy Smith	6	0							0				3				1				0	4	11		0
13	5	(Denmark) (16) Jesper B. Jensen	4		F			0					0					1					1	2	15	3
14	10	(Poland) (15) Piotr Protasiewicz	3			F			2						1			F		0				3	14	2
15	2	(Sweden) (17) Mikael Karlsson	2	1					1				1				1				0			4	13	1
16	6	(Poland) (14) Sławomir Drabik	1		1				0			0							0			0		1	16	0
17	17	(Sweden) (5) Henrik Gustafsson	–																					-	17
18	18	(United Kingdom) (9) Simon Wigg	–																					-	18
Placing	Draw	Rider	Total	1	2	3	4	5	6	7	8	9	10	11	12	13	14	15	16	17	18	19	20	Pts	Pos	21	22	23	24

Heat 21 (Final D): Riders placed 13th to 16th Heat 22 (Final C): Riders placed 9th to 12th	Heat 23 (Final B): Riders placed 5th to 8th Heat 24 (Final A): Riders placed 1st to 4th

gate A – inside	gate B	gate C	gate D – outside

== The final classification ==
Qualifies for next season's Grand Prix series
Full-time Grand Prix rider
Wild card, track reserve or qualified reserve

Pos.	Rider	Points	CZE (Czech Republic)	SWE (Sweden)	GER (Germany)	GBR (United Kingdom)	POL (Poland)	DEN (Denmark)
Gold	(United States) (3) Greg Hancock	118	25	20	18	12	25	18
Silver	(United States) (1) Billy Hamill	101	20	12	16	20	20	13
Bronze	(Poland) (13) Tomasz Gollob	92	18	25	1	14	18	16
4	(Sweden) (4) Tony Rickardsson	90	11	18	14	13	14	20
5	(United Kingdom) (7) Mark Loram	81	7	13	8	16	12	25
6	(Denmark) (12) Brian Andersen	80	9	14	20	25	4	8
7	(Denmark) (2) Hans Nielsen	75	8	16	25	7	7	12
8	(Sweden) (11) Jimmy Nilsen	71	13	7	13	18	9	11
9	(United Kingdom) (8) Chris Louis	59	12	4	12	4	13	14
10	(Australia) (10) Leigh Adams	42	6	6	9	9	3	9
11	(Poland) (14) Sławomir Drabik	38	16	2	6	2	11	1
12	(Sweden) (6) Peter Karlsson	37	4	11	3	6	6	7
13	(Poland) (15) Piotr Protasiewicz	31	1	ns	11	0	16	3
14	(United Kingdom) (18) Andy Smith	22	ns	9	4	3	ns	6
15	(Sweden) (5) Henrik Gustafsson	20	14	3	–	1	2	ns
16	(Sweden) (17) Mikael Karlsson	14	ns	1	ns	11	ns	2
17	(United Kingdom) (9) Simon Wigg	13	3	ns	2	ns	8	ns
18	(Australia) (16) Jason Crump	8	–	8	–	–	–	–
19	(United Kingdom) (16) Joe Screen	8	–	–	–	8	–	–
20	(Germany) (16) Robert Barth	7	–	–	7	–	–	–
21	(Denmark) (16) Jesper B. Jensen	4	–	–	–	–	–	4
22	(Czech Republic) (16) Tomáš Topinka	2	2	–	–	–	–	–
23	(Poland) (16) Rafał Dobrucki	1	–	–	–	–	1	–
Rider(s) not classified
	(United States) (19) Sam Ermolenko	—	–	–	ns	–	–	–
Pos.	Rider	Points	CZE (Czech Republic)	SWE (Sweden)	GER (Germany)	GBR (United Kingdom)	POL (Poland)	DEN (Denmark)

== See also ==
- Speedway Grand Prix
- List of Speedway Grand Prix riders
