= 1997 Speedway Grand Prix of Germany =

Information
- Date: 6 July 1997
- City: (Germany) Landshut
- Event: 3 of 6 (15)
- Referee: Frank Edbon

Stadium details
- Stadium: Ellermühle Stadium
- Track: speedway track

SGP Results
- Best Time
- (gold) Winner: (Denmark) Hans Nielsen
- (silver) Runner-up: (Denmark) Brian Andersen
- (bronze) 3rd place: (United States) Greg Hancock

The 1997 Speedway Grand Prix of Germany was the third race of the 1997 Speedway Grand Prix season. It took place on 6 July in the Ellermühle Stadium in Landshut, Germany It was the third Swedish SGP and was won by Danish rider Hans Nielsen. It was the fourth win of his career.

== Starting positions draw ==
The Speedway Grand Prix Commission nominated Robert Barth from Germany as Wild Card.

Draw . (Sweden) (5) Henrik Gustafsson → (United Kingdom) (18) Andy Smith
Draw . (United Kingdom) (18) Andy Smith → (Sweden) (17) Mikael Karlsson
Draw . (Sweden) (17) Mikael Karlsson → (United States) (19) Sam Ermolenko

== Heat details ==
Placing	Draw	Rider	Total	1	2	3	4	5	6	7	8	9	10	11	12	13	14	15	16	17	18	19	20	Pts	Pos	21	22	23	24
1	2	(Denmark) (2) Hans Nielsen	25	3					3				3				3				E			12	1				3
2	9	(Denmark) (12) Brian Andersen	20			1		2						3					2		2			10	3				2
3	12	(United States) (3) Greg Hancock	18			3					0		2			3						3		11	2				1
4	14	(United States) (1) Billy Hamill	16				2		2					2		1							3	10	4				E
5	8	(Sweden) (4) Tony Rickardsson	14		E						2			0			2			3				7	8			3
6	16	(Sweden) (11) Jimmy Nilsen	13				0				1	2						3			3			9	5			2
7	15	(United Kingdom) (8) Chris Louis	12				1			3			0						3	1				8	6			1
8	13	(Poland) (15) Piotr Protasiewicz	11				3	3							1		0					X		7	7			0
9	7	(Australia) (10) Leigh Adams	9		2					1					3	0					1			7	9		3
10	3	(United Kingdom) (7) Mark Loram	8	1						2				1				2				1		7	11		2
11	6	(Germany) (16) Robert Barth	7		1				0			3							1			2		7	10		1
12	4	(Poland) (14) Sławomir Drabik	6	0							3				2				0				1	6	12		0
13	5	(United Kingdom) (18) Andy Smith	4		3			1					1					1					0	6	13	3
14	10	(Sweden) (6) Peter Karlsson	3			2			1						0			0		2				5	14	2
15	11	(United Kingdom) (9) Simon Wigg	2			0				0		1					1						2	4	16	1
16	1	(Poland) (13) Tomasz Gollob	1	2				0				0				2				0				4	15	0
17	17	(Sweden) (17) Mikael Karlsson	–																					-	17
18	18	(United States) (19) Sam Ermolenko	–																					-	18
Placing	Draw	Rider	Total	1	2	3	4	5	6	7	8	9	10	11	12	13	14	15	16	17	18	19	20	Pts	Pos	21	22	23	24

Heat 21 (Final D): Riders placed 13th to 16th Heat 22 (Final C): Riders placed 9th to 12th	Heat 23 (Final B): Riders placed 5th to 8th Heat 24 (Final A): Riders placed 1st to 4th

gate A – inside	gate B	gate C	gate D – outside

== The intermediate classification ==
Qualifies for next season's Grand Prix series
Full-time Grand Prix rider
Wild card, track reserve or qualified reserve

Pos.	Rider	Points	CZE (Czech Republic)	SWE (Sweden)	GER (Germany)	GBR (United Kingdom)	POL (Poland)	DEN (Denmark)
1	(United States) (3) Greg Hancock	63	25	20	18			
2	(Denmark) (2) Hans Nielsen	49	8	16	25			
3	(United States) (1) Billy Hamill	48	20	12	16			
4	(Poland) (13) Tomasz Gollob	44	18	25	1			
5	(Sweden) (4) Tony Rickardsson	43	11	18	14			
6	(Denmark) (12) Brian Andersen	43	9	14	20			
7	(Sweden) (11) Jimmy Nilsen	33	13	7	13			
8	(United Kingdom) (7) Mark Loram	28	7	13	8			
9	(United Kingdom) (8) Chris Louis	28	12	4	12			
10	(Poland) (14) Sławomir Drabik	24	16	2	6			
11	(Australia) (10) Leigh Adams	21	6	6	9			
12	(Sweden) (6) Peter Karlsson	18	4	11	3			
13	(Sweden) (5) Henrik Gustafsson	17	14	3	–			
14	(United Kingdom) (18) Andy Smith	13	ns	9	4			
15	(Poland) (15) Piotr Protasiewicz	12	1	ns	11			
16	(Australia) (16) Jason Crump	8	–	8	–			
17	(Germany) (16) Robert Barth	7	–	–	7			
18	(United Kingdom) (9) Simon Wigg	5	3	ns	2			
19	(Czech Republic) (16) Tomáš Topinka	2	2	–	–			
20	(Sweden) (17) Mikael Karlsson	1	ns	1	ns			
Rider(s) not classified
	(United States) (19) Sam Ermolenko	—	–	–	ns			
Pos.	Rider	Points	CZE (Czech Republic)	SWE (Sweden)	GER (Germany)	GBR (United Kingdom)	POL (Poland)	DEN (Denmark)

== See also ==
- Speedway Grand Prix
- List of Speedway Grand Prix riders
