= 1997 Speedway Grand Prix of Poland =

Information
- Date: 30 August 1997
- City: (Poland) Wrocław
- Event: 5 of 6 (17)
- Referee: (Germany) Wolfgang Glas

Stadium details
- Stadium: Olympic Stadium
- Track: speedway track

SGP Results
- Best Time
- (gold) Winner: (United States) Greg Hancock
- (silver) Runner-up: (United States) Billy Hamill
- (bronze) 3rd place: (Poland) Tomasz Gollob

The 1997 Speedway Grand Prix of Poland was the fifth race of the 1997 Speedway Grand Prix season. It took place on 30 August in the Olympic Stadium in Wrocław, Poland It was the third Polish SGP and was won by American rider Greg Hancock. It was the third win of his career.

== Starting positions draw ==
The Speedway Grand Prix Commission nominated Rafał Dobrucki from Poland as Wild Card.

== Heat details ==
Placing	Draw	Rider	Total	1	2	3	4	5	6	7	8	9	10	11	12	13	14	15	16	17	18	19	20	Pts	Pos	21	22	23	24
1	3	(United States) (3) Greg Hancock	25	3						3				0				3				3		12	3				3
2	14	(United States) (1) Billy Hamill	20				3		3					2		2							3	13	2				2
3	8	(Poland) (13) Tomasz Gollob	18		3						3			3			3			2				14	1				1
4	5	(Poland) (15) Piotr Protasiewicz	16		2			3					3					1					2	11	4				0
5	16	(Sweden) (4) Tony Rickardsson	14				2				2	3						2			1			10	7			3
6	1	(United Kingdom) (8) Chris Louis	13	2				1				2				3				3				11	5			2
7	7	(United Kingdom) (7) Mark Loram	12		1					1					3	E					3			8	8			1
8	9	(Poland) (14) Sławomir Drabik	11			3		2						1					2		2			10	6			0
9	13	(Sweden) (11) Jimmy Nilsen	9				1	0							2		2					0		5	11		3
10	15	(United Kingdom) (9) Simon Wigg	8				0			0			1						3	1				5	10		2
11	12	(Denmark) (2) Hans Nielsen	7			2					0		2			1						2		7	9		1
12	10	(Sweden) (6) Peter Karlsson	6			1			2						1			0		0				4	12		0
13	2	(Denmark) (12) Brian Andersen	4	0					1				0				1				0			2	16	3
14	11	(Australia) (10) Leigh Adams	3			0				2		0					0						1	3	13	2
15	4	(Sweden) (5) Henrik Gustafsson	2	1							1				X				0				0	2	15	1
16	6	(Poland) (16) Rafał Dobrucki	1		0				0			1							1			1		3	14	0
17	17	(Sweden) (17) Mikael Karlsson	–																					-	17
18	18	(United Kingdom) (18) Andy Smith	–																					-	18
Placing	Draw	Rider	Total	1	2	3	4	5	6	7	8	9	10	11	12	13	14	15	16	17	18	19	20	Pts	Pos	21	22	23	24

Heat 21 (Final D): Riders placed 13th to 16th Heat 22 (Final C): Riders placed 9th to 12th	Heat 23 (Final B): Riders placed 5th to 8th Heat 24 (Final A): Riders placed 1st to 4th

gate A – inside	gate B	gate C	gate D – outside

== The intermediate classification ==
Qualifies for next season's Grand Prix series
Full-time Grand Prix rider
Wild card, track reserve or qualified reserve

Pos.	Rider	Points	CZE (Czech Republic)	SWE (Sweden)	GER (Germany)	GBR (United Kingdom)	POL (Poland)	DEN (Denmark)
1	(United States) (3) Greg Hancock	100	25	20	18	12	25	
2	(United States) (1) Billy Hamill	88	20	12	16	20	20	
3	(Poland) (13) Tomasz Gollob	76	18	25	1	14	18	
4	(Denmark) (12) Brian Andersen	72	9	14	20	25	4	
5	(Sweden) (4) Tony Rickardsson	70	11	18	14	13	14	
6	(Denmark) (2) Hans Nielsen	63	8	16	25	7	7	
7	(Sweden) (11) Jimmy Nilsen	60	13	7	13	18	9	
8	(United Kingdom) (7) Mark Loram	56	7	13	8	16	12	
9	(United Kingdom) (8) Chris Louis	45	12	4	12	4	13	
10	(Poland) (14) Sławomir Drabik	37	16	2	6	2	11	
11	(Australia) (10) Leigh Adams	33	6	6	9	9	3	
12	(Sweden) (6) Peter Karlsson	30	4	11	3	6	6	
13	(Poland) (15) Piotr Protasiewicz	28	1	ns	11	0	16	
14	(Sweden) (5) Henrik Gustafsson	20	14	3	–	1	2	
15	(United Kingdom) (18) Andy Smith	16	ns	9	4	3	ns	
16	(United Kingdom) (9) Simon Wigg	13	3	ns	2	ns	8	
17	(Sweden) (17) Mikael Karlsson	12	ns	1	ns	11	ns	
18	(Australia) (16) Jason Crump	8	–	8	–	–	–	
19	(United Kingdom) (16) Joe Screen	8	–	–	–	8	–	
20	(Germany) (16) Robert Barth	7	–	–	7	–	–	
21	(Czech Republic) (16) Tomáš Topinka	2	2	–	–	–	–	
21	(Poland) (16) Rafał Dobrucki	1	–	–	–	–	1	
Rider(s) not classified
	(United States) (19) Sam Ermolenko	—	–	–	ns	–	–	
Pos.	Rider	Points	CZE (Czech Republic)	SWE (Sweden)	GER (Germany)	GBR (United Kingdom)	POL (Poland)	DEN (Denmark)

== See also ==
- Speedway Grand Prix
- List of Speedway Grand Prix riders
