= 1982 Overseas final =

Speedway competition in London, England

1982 Overseas Final

Seasons
- ← 1981 1983 →

The 1982 Overseas Final was the second running of the Overseas Final as part of the qualification for the 1982 Speedway World Championship Final to be held at the Los Angeles Memorial Coliseum in the United States. The 1982 Final was run on 4 July at the White City Stadium in London, England, and was the second last qualifying round for Commonwealth and American riders.

The Top 10 riders qualified for the Intercontinental Final to be held at the Vetlanda Speedway in Vetlanda, Sweden. England's Dave Jessup won his second straight Overseas Final.

Reigning World Champion Bruce Penhall caused a stir at the 1982 Overseas Final. Heat 19 of the event involved 4 riders from the USA (brothers Kelly and Shawn Moran, Penhall and his childhood friend Dennis Sigalos). Penhall, having already scored enough points to qualify for the Intercontinental Final, deliberately finished last in the heat (ending his chance of winning the meeting, though he still finished an easy third) to allow Kelly Moran and Sigalos to qualify directly for the Intercontinental Final and allowing Shawn Moran to qualify for a run-off for the final placings for which he was unsuccessful. Had Penhall won the race, and his fellow Americans had finished in the same order, Kelly Moran and Sigalos would have qualified anyway. English commentator Dave Lanning called it a circus, and the crowd booed Penhall, but also noted that it wasn't an unprecedented happening, claiming that riders from other nations had previously done similar in order to help their countrymen qualify.

== 1982 Overseas Final ==
- 4 July
- (United Kingdom) London, White City Stadium
- Qualification: Top 10 plus 1 reserve to the 1982 Intercontinental Final in Vetlanda, Sweden

Pos.	Rider	Total
1	(England) Dave Jessup	13
2	(England) Kenny Carter	12
3	(United States) Bruce Penhall	11
4	(New Zealand) Larry Ross	8
5	(England) Andy Grahame	8
6	(United States) Kelly Moran	8
7	(United States) Dennis Sigalos	8
8	(Australia) Phil Crump	8
9	(England) Les Collins	7+3
10	(England) Peter Collins	7+2
11	(United States) Shawn Moran	7+1
12	(England) Alan Grahame	6
13	(New Zealand) Ivan Mauger	6
14	(Australia) Billy Sanders	5
15	(England) Chris Morton	5
16	(England) Phil Collins	1

== See also ==
- Motorcycle Speedway
