= 1996 Intercontinental final =

Speedway competition

1996 Intercontinental Final

Seasons
- ← 1995 1997 →

The 1996 Intercontinental Final was the eighteenth running of the Intercontinental Final and was the second last qualifying stage for Motorcycle speedway riders to qualify for the 1997 Speedway Grand Prix series. The Final was run on 28 July at the Holsted Speedway Center in Holsted, Denmark

The Intercontinental Final saw a unique situation where 13 of the riders had come from the Scandinavian Final, five more than originally planned. This came about because of the FIM's controversial post-meeting decision to disqualify all bar three riders (Ryan Sullivan, Kelvin Tatum and Mark Lemon) from the Overseas Final in Coventry, England, for not starting the meeting on flat tyres.

Italian rider Valentino Furlanetto would be added to the Intercontinental Final line up as an injury replacement for Mark Lemon, making him the first and only "Continental" rider to ever race in the Intercontinental Final. He scored 1 point from his 5 rides.

Jimmy Nilsen won the event.

== Intercontinental Final ==
- 28 July
- (Denmark) Holsted, Holsted Speedway Center
- Top 2 to 1997 Speedway Grand Prix
- Riders 3–7 plus 1 reserve to GP Challenge

Pos.	Rider	Total
1	(Sweden) Jimmy Nilsen	13+3
2	(Denmark) Brian Andersen	13+2
3	(Germany) Gerd Riss	12
4	(Sweden) Stefan Dannö	11
5	(Sweden) Mikael Karlsson	10
6	(Australia) Ryan Sullivan	9
7	(Denmark) Brian Karger	9
8	(Norway) Rune Holta	8
9	(Denmark) Jan Stæchmann	7
10	(United Kingdom) Kelvin Tatum	6
11	(Denmark) John Jørgensen	5
12	(Denmark) Ronni Pedersen	5
13	(Sweden) Niklas Klingberg	5
14	(Norway) Arnt Førland	4
15	(Finland) Vesa Ylinen	2
16	(Italy) Valentino Furlanetto	1
17	(Finland) Kai Laukkanen (Res)	0
