= 1981 Overseas final =

Speedway competition in London, England

1981 Overseas Final

Seasons
- ← none 1982 →

The 1981 Overseas Final was the inaugural running of the Overseas Final as part of the qualification for the 1981 Speedway World Championship Final to be held at the Wembley Stadium in London, England. The 1981 Final was run on 12 July at the White City Stadium in London, and was the second last qualifying round for Commonwealth and American riders.

The Top 10 riders qualified for the Intercontinental Final to be held at the Speedway Center in Vojens, Denmark. England's Dave Jessup won the first ever Overseas Final.

== 1981 Overseas Final ==
- 12 July
- (United Kingdom) London, White City Stadium
- Qualification: Top 10 plus 1 reserve to the Intercontinental Final in Vojens, Denmark

Pos.	Rider	Total
1	(England) Dave Jessup	13
2	(England) Chris Morton	11
3	(United States) Bruce Penhall	10+3
4	(United States) Kelly Moran	10+2
5	(United States) Dennis Sigalos	10+1
6	(New Zealand) Larry Ross	9
7	(England) John Louis	9
8	(England) Michael Lee	9
9	(England) Kenny Carter	8
10	(New Zealand) Ivan Mauger	8
11	(England) Les Collins	7
12	(England) Steve Bastable	6
13	(England) Ian Cartwright	4
14	(United States) Scott Autrey	4
15	(Australia) Danny Kennedy	2
16	(Australia) Phil Herne	0

== See also ==
- Motorcycle Speedway
