= 1982 Intercontinental final =

1982 Intercontinental Final

Seasons
- ← 1981 1983 →

The 1982 Intercontinental Final was the eighth running of the Intercontinental Final as part of the qualification for the 1982 Speedway World Championship. The 1982 Final was run on 23 July at the Vetlanda Speedway in Vetlanda, Sweden, and was the last qualifying stage for riders from Scandinavia, the USA and from the Commonwealth nations for the World Final to be held at the Memorial Coliseum in Los Angeles, USA.

English rider Les Collins, the younger brother of 1976 World Champion Peter Collins, in the best year of his career won the Intercontinental Final from countryman Kenny Carter and American Dennis Sigalos who defeated Hans Nielsen in a runoff for third place. Other World Final qualifiers were Kelly Moran, Dave Jessup, Kai Niemi, Jan Andersson, Phil Crump and Peter Collins. A three rider run-off was required for the final placing Collins won the run-off from Andy Grahame and Bo Petersen the riders to miss out.

Also qualifying was defending World Champion Bruce Penhall who would go on to win his second successive World title in his home town of Los Angeles before announcing the worst kept secret in speedway, his retirement from the sport to become an actor on the American television series CHiPs.

Somewhat surprisingly, triple World Champion Ole Olsen finished in 15th place having scored only 4 points. Even more surprising was countryman and future triple World Champion Erik Gundersen who finished in 16th and last place having scored just 3 points, though Gundersen did suffer numerous bike problems throughout the Final in Vetlanda. In his Individual World Championship career this would be the only time Gundersen ever finished last in a qualifying meeting.

In the last heat, both Olsen and Gundersen slowed on the last corner to let fellow countryman Bo Petersen past them to take the second place in that heat which gave Petersen a shot at the final qualifying spot in a run-off in which he was eventually unsuccessful. The move bore comparison to Bruce Penhall allowing his fellow countrymen to beat him in the Overseas Final

== 1982 Intercontinental Final ==
- 23 August
- (Sweden) Vetlanda, Vetlanda Speedway
- Qualification: Top 11 plus 1 reserve to the World Final in Los Angeles, USA

Pos.	Rider	Total
1	(England) Les Collins	12
2	(England) Kenny Carter	11
3	(United States) Dennis Sigalos	10+3
4	(Denmark) Hans Nielsen	10+2
5	(United States) Kelly Moran	9
6	(United States) Bruce Penhall	9
7	(England) Dave Jessup	8
8	(Finland) Kai Niemi	7
9	(Sweden) Jan Andersson	7
10	(Australia) Phil Crump	7
11	(England) Peter Collins	6+3
12	(England) Andy Grahame	6+2
13	(Denmark) Bo Petersen	6+1
14	(New Zealand) Larry Ross	5
15	(Denmark) Ole Olsen	4
16	(Denmark) Erik Gundersen	3
	(United States) Shawn Moran (Res)	dnr
	(Denmark) Tommy Knudsen (Res)	dnr

== See also ==
- Motorcycle Speedway
