= 1997 Speedway Grand Prix of Great Britain =

(United Kingdom) 1997 Speedway Grand Prix of Great Britain

Information
- Date: 9 August 1997
- City: (United Kingdom) Bradford
- Event: 4 of 6 (16)
- Referee: (Sweden) Christer Bergstrom

Stadium details
- Stadium: Odsal Stadium
- Track: speedway track

SGP Results
- Best Time
- (gold) Winner: (Denmark) Brian Andersen
- (silver) Runner-up: (United States) Billy Hamill
- (bronze) 3rd place: (Sweden) Jimmy Nilsen

The 1997 Speedway Grand Prix of Great Britain was the fourth race of the 1997 Speedway Grand Prix season. It was taken place on 9 August in the Odsal Stadium in Bradford, Great Britain It was the third British SGP but the first and only in Bradford. The race was won by Danish rider Brian Andersen. It was the first and only win in his career.

== Starting positions draw ==
The Speedway Grand Prix Commission nominated Joe Screen from Great Britain as Wild Card.

== Heat details ==
Placing	Draw	Rider	Total	1	2	3	4	5	6	7	8	9	10	11	12	13	14	15	16	17	18	19	20	Pts	Pos	21	22	23	24
1	7	(Denmark) (12) Brian Andersen	25		E					3					3	3					3			12	2				3
2	6	(United States) (1) Billy Hamill	20		3				1			2							2			2		10	4				2
3	11	(Sweden) (11) Jimmy Nilsen	18			3				2		3					1						3	12	3				1
4	8	(United Kingdom) (7) Mark Loram	16		2						3			3			2			3				13	1				0
5	13	(Poland) (13) Tomasz Gollob	14				3	2							X		F					3		8	6			3
6	4	(Sweden) (4) Tony Rickardsson	13	3							E				1				3				1	8	7			2
7	9	(United States) (3) Greg Hancock	12			2		3						2					0		1			8	8			1
8	14	(Sweden) (17) Mikael Karlsson	11				2		3					0		2							2	9	5			0
9	3	(Australia) (10) Leigh Adams	9	2						X				1				3				1		7	10		3
10	10	(United Kingdom) (16) Joe Screen	8			0			2						2			2		2				8	9		2
11	12	(Denmark) (2) Hans Nielsen	7			1					2		3			1						0		7	11		1
12	15	(Sweden) (6) Peter Karlsson	6				1			1			2						1	1				6	12		0
13	2	(United Kingdom) (8) Chris Louis	4	E					E				1				3				2			6	13	3
14	5	(United Kingdom) (18) Andy Smith	3		1			1					0					0					0	2	14	2
15	1	(Poland) (14) Sławomir Drabik	2	1				0				1				0				0				2	15	1
16	16	(Sweden) (5) Henrik Gustafsson	1				0				1	M						1			0			2	16	0
17	17	(Poland) (15) Piotr Protasiewicz	0									0												0	17
18	18	(United Kingdom) (9) Simon Wigg	–																					-	18
Placing	Draw	Rider	Total	1	2	3	4	5	6	7	8	9	10	11	12	13	14	15	16	17	18	19	20	Pts	Pos	21	22	23	24

Heat 21 (Final D): Riders placed 13th to 16th Heat 22 (Final C): Riders placed 9th to 12th	Heat 23 (Final B): Riders placed 5th to 8th Heat 24 (Final A): Riders placed 1st to 4th

gate A – inside	gate B	gate C	gate D – outside

== The intermediate classification ==
Qualifies for next season's Grand Prix series
Full-time Grand Prix rider
Wild card, track reserve or qualified reserve

Pos.	Rider	Points	CZE (Czech Republic)	SWE (Sweden)	GER (Germany)	GBR (United Kingdom)	POL (Poland)	DEN (Denmark)
1	(United States) (3) Greg Hancock	75	25	20	18	12		
2	(United States) (1) Billy Hamill	68	20	12	16	20		
3	(Denmark) (12) Brian Andersen	68	9	14	20	25		
4	(Poland) (13) Tomasz Gollob	58	18	25	1	14		
5	(Denmark) (2) Hans Nielsen	56	8	16	25	7		
6	(Sweden) (4) Tony Rickardsson	56	11	18	14	13		
7	(Sweden) (11) Jimmy Nilsen	51	13	7	13	18		
8	(United Kingdom) (7) Mark Loram	44	7	13	8	16		
9	(United Kingdom) (8) Chris Louis	32	12	4	12	4		
10	(Australia) (10) Leigh Adams	30	6	6	9	9		
11	(Poland) (14) Sławomir Drabik	26	16	2	6	2		
12	(Sweden) (6) Peter Karlsson	24	4	11	3	6		
13	(Sweden) (5) Henrik Gustafsson	18	14	3	–	1		
14	(United Kingdom) (18) Andy Smith	16	ns	9	4	3		
15	(Poland) (15) Piotr Protasiewicz	12	1	ns	11	0		
16	(Sweden) (17) Mikael Karlsson	12	ns	1	ns	11		
17	(Australia) (16) Jason Crump	8	–	8	–	–		
18	(United Kingdom) (16) Joe Screen	8	–	–	–	8		
19	(Germany) (16) Robert Barth	7	–	–	7	–		
20	(United Kingdom) (9) Simon Wigg	5	3	ns	2	ns		
21	(Czech Republic) (16) Tomáš Topinka	2	2	–	–	–		
Rider(s) not classified
	(United States) (19) Sam Ermolenko	—	–	–	ns	–		
Pos.	Rider	Points	CZE (Czech Republic)	SWE (Sweden)	GER (Germany)	GBR (United Kingdom)	POL (Poland)	DEN (Denmark)

== See also ==
- Speedway Grand Prix
- List of Speedway Grand Prix riders
