= 1980 Intercontinental final =

1980 Intercontinental Final

Seasons
- ← 1979 1981 →

The 1980 Intercontinental Final was the sixth running of the Intercontinental Final as part of the qualification for the 1980 Speedway World Championship. The 1980 Final was run on 3 August at the White City Stadium in London, England, and was the last qualifying stage for riders from Scandinavia, the United States and from the Commonwealth nations for the World Final to be held at the Ullevi stadium in Gothenburg, Sweden.

England's Chris Morton won his only Intercontinental Final after defeating star American rider Bruce Penhall in a runoff when both riders finished on 12 points from their five rides. Reigning Australian Champion Billy Sanders defeated Finland's Kai Niemi in a runoff for third place with each rider scoring 11 points.

Triple World Champion Ole Olsen defeated American Scott Autrey in a runoff to claim one of the reserve spots for the World Final. Nearing the end of his record-breaking career, six time and defending World Champion Ivan Mauger finished in a disappointing 13th place having scored just 5 points from his five rides and would not ride in a World Final for the first time since 1966. The failures of Olsen and Mauger to reach the World Final was seen as a changing of the guard as the pair had dominated the sport for ever a decade, between them winning nine of the twelve World Championships since 1968. The next generation of riders such as Morton, Penhall, Sanders, Michael Lee and Hans Nielsen, as well as others such as Erik Gundersen, Shawn Moran, Dennis Sigalos, Kenny Carter and Tommy Knudsen, were expected to lead sport into the 1980s.

Michael Lee would go on to win the World Final in Göteborg, Sweden

== 1980 Intercontinental Final ==
- 3 August
- (United Kingdom) London, White City Stadium
- Qualification: Top 10 plus 1 reserve to the World Final in Gothenburg, Sweden

Pos.	Rider	Total
1	(England) Chris Morton	12+3
2	(United States) Bruce Penhall	12+2
3	(Australia) Billy Sanders	11+3
4	(Finland) Kai Niemi	11+2
5	(Denmark) Finn Thomsen	10
6	(England) Dave Jessup	9
7	(England) Michael Lee	9
8	(England) John Davis	9
9	(Denmark) Hans Nielsen	8
10	(England) Peter Collins	7
11	(Denmark) Ole Olsen	6+3
12	(United States) Scott Autrey	6+2
13	(New Zealand) Ivan Mauger	5
14	(England) John Louis	3
15	(New Zealand) Mitch Shirra	1
16	(Denmark) Bent Leif Rasmussen	0
17	(England) Gordon Kennett (Res)	0

== Classification ==
Placing	Rider	Total	1	2	3	4	5	6	7	8	9	10	11	12	13	14	15	16	17	18	19	20	Pts	Pos	
1	(England) (1) Chris Morton	12	2				1				3				3				3				12	1	3
2	(United States) (5) Bruce Penhall	12		3			3					1					3					2	12	2	2
3	(Australia) (15) Billy Sanders	11				1			3			3						2	2				11	3	3
4	(Finland) (3) Kai Niemi	11	3						2				2				1				3		11	4	2
5	(Denmark) (16) Finn Thomsen	10				2				2	1						2			3			10	5	
6	(England) (8) Dave Jessup	9		2						3			E			3			1				9	6	
7	(England) (13) Michael Lee	9				3	0							3		1					2		9	7	
8	(England) (9) John Davis	9			1		2						3					1		2			9	8	
9	(Denmark) (4) Hans Nielsen	8	1							1				X				3				3	8	9	
10	(England) (2) Peter Collins	7	0					3				2				2				0			7	10	
11	(Denmark) (7) Ole Olsen	6		1					1					2	1					1			6	11	
12	(United States) (11) Scott Autrey	6			3				0		2					0						1	6	12	
13	(New Zealand) (14) Ivan Mauger	5				0		2					1		2							0	5	13	
14	(England) (12) John Louis	3			2					0		0			0						1		3	14	
15	(New Zealand) (6) Mitch Shirra	1		0				1			0							0			0		1	15	
16	(Denmark) (10) Bent Leif Rasmussen	0			0			0						X			E		-				0	16	
R1	(England) (R1) Gordon Kennett	0																	0				0	R1	
Placing	Rider	Total	1	2	3	4	5	6	7	8	9	10	11	12	13	14	15	16	17	18	19	20	Pts	Pos	

m - exclusion for exceeding two minute time allowance • t - exclusion for touching the tapes • x - other exclusion • e - retired or mechanical failure • f - fell • ns - non-starter • nc - non-classify

gate A - inside	gate B	gate C	gate D - outside

== See also ==
- Motorcycle Speedway
