= 1990 Intercontinental final =

International motorcycle speedway competition

1990 Intercontinental Final

Seasons
- ← 1989 1995 →

The 1990 Intercontinental Final was the sixteenth running of the Intercontinental Final as part of the qualification for the 1990 Speedway World Championship. The 1990 Final was run on 12 August at the Fjelsted Speedway Stadium in Fjelsted, Denmark, and was the last qualifying stage for riders from Scandinavia, the US and from the Commonwealth nations for the World Final to be held at the Odsal Stadium in Bradford, England.

== Intercontinental Final ==
- 12 August
- (Denmark) Fjelsted, Fjelsted Speedway Stadium
- Qualification: Top 11 plus 1 reserve to the World Final in Bradford, England

Pos.	Rider	Heat Scores	Total
1	(United States) Shawn Moran	(3,2,3,3,3)	14
2	(Sweden) Per Jonsson	(3,3,1,2,3)	12
3	(Denmark) Hans Nielsen	(2,3,3,2,1)	11+3
4	(Denmark) Jan O. Pedersen	(3,1,1,3,3)	11+2
5	(United States) Rick Miller	(3,1,3,1,2)	10
6	(United Kingdom) Kelvin Tatum	(2,R,3,2,2)	9
7	(United States) Ronnie Correy	(R,2,3,2,2	9
8	(United Kingdom) Richard Knight*	(1,2,2,0,3)	8
9	(United Kingdom) Martin Dugard	(1,3,0,3,0)	7
10	(Sweden) Jimmy Nilsen	(2,2,2,1,0)	7
11	(Australia) Todd Wiltshire	(2,0,2,0,2)	6
12	(Sweden) Henrik Gustafsson	(R,1,0,3,1)	5
13	(Sweden) Dennis Löfqvist	(1,0,1,1,1)	4
14	(Australia) Troy Butler	(R,2,1,0,F)	3
15	(Sweden) Conny Ivarsson	(1,0,0,0,1)	2
16	(United Kingdom) Jeremy Doncaster	(0,1,0,1,0)	2

* Richard Knight replaced the injured Simon Cross

== See also ==
- Motorcycle Speedway
