= 1997 Speedway Grand Prix of Czech Republic =

Information
- Date: 17 May 1997
- City: (Czech Republic) Prague
- Event: 1 of 6 (13)
- Referee: Christer Bergstrom

Stadium details
- Stadium: Marketa Stadium
- Track: speedway track

SGP Results
- Best Time
- (gold) Winner: (United States) Greg Hancock
- (silver) Runner-up: (United States) Billy Hamill
- (bronze) 3rd place: (Poland) Tomasz Gollob

The 1997 Speedway Grand Prix of Czech Republic was the first race of the 1997 Speedway Grand Prix season. It took place on 17 May in the Marketa Stadium in Prague, Czech Republic It was the first Czech Republic SGP and was won by American rider Greg Hancock. It was the second win of his career.

== Starting positions draw ==
The Speedway Grand Prix Commission nominated Tomas Topinka from Czech Republic as Wild Card.

== Heat details ==
Placing	Draw	Rider	Total	1	2	3	4	5	6	7	8	9	10	11	12	13	14	15	16	17	18	19	20	Pts	Pos	21	22	23	24
1	5	(United States) (3) Greg Hancock	25		3			3					3					2					2	13	1				3
2	11	(United States) (1) Billy Hamill	20			2				1		3					3						3	12	2				2
3	16	(Poland) (13) Tomasz Gollob	18				2				3	2						3			1			11	3				1
4	10	(Poland) (14) Sławomir Drabik	16			3			3						2			1		2				11	4				0
5	15	(Sweden) (5) Henrik Gustafsson	14				3			3			E						2	1				9	8			3
6	6	(Sweden) (11) Jimmy Nilsen	13		2				2			X							3			2		9	7			2
7	8	(United Kingdom) (8) Chris Louis	12		0						2			3			2			3				10	5			1
8	12	(Sweden) (4) Tony Rickardsson	11			1					1		1			3						3		9	6			0
9	2	(Denmark) (12) Brian Andersen	9	0					0				2				1				3			6	11		3
10	7	(Denmark) (2) Hans Nielsen	8		1					2					3	2					0			8	9		2
11	4	(United Kingdom) (7) Mark Loram	7	3							0				1				1				1	6	10		1
12	9	(Australia) (10) Leigh Adams	6			0		2						2					0		2			6	12		0
13	14	(Sweden) (6) Peter Karlsson	4				1		1					1		1							0	4	13	3
14	3	(United Kingdom) (9) Simon Wigg	3	2						0				0				0				E		2	15	2
15	13	(Czech Republic) (16) Tomáš Topinka	2				0	1							T		0					1		2	14	1
16	1	(Poland) (15) Piotr Protasiewicz	1	1				0				1				0				0				2	16	0
17	17	(Sweden) (17) Mikael Karlsson	–																					-	17
18	18	(United Kingdom) (18) Andy Smith	–																					-	18
Placing	Draw	Rider	Total	1	2	3	4	5	6	7	8	9	10	11	12	13	14	15	16	17	18	19	20	Pts	Pos	21	22	23	24

Heat 21 (Final D): Riders placed 13th to 16th Heat 22 (Final C): Riders placed 9th to 12th	Heat 23 (Final B): Riders placed 5th to 8th Heat 24 (Final A): Riders placed 1st to 4th

gate A – inside	gate B	gate C	gate D – outside

== The intermediate classification ==
Qualifies for next season's Grand Prix series
Full-time Grand Prix rider
Wild card, track reserve or qualified reserve

Pos.	Rider	Points	CZE (Czech Republic)	SWE (Sweden)	GER (Germany)	GBR (United Kingdom)	POL (Poland)	DEN (Denmark)
1	(United States) (3) Greg Hancock	25	25					
2	(United States) (1) Billy Hamill	20	20					
3	(Poland) (13) Tomasz Gollob	18	18					
4	(Poland) (14) Sławomir Drabik	16	16					
5	(Sweden) (5) Henrik Gustafsson	14	14					
6	(Sweden) (11) Jimmy Nilsen	13	13					
7	(United Kingdom) (8) Chris Louis	12	12					
8	(Sweden) (4) Tony Rickardsson	11	11					
9	(Denmark) (12) Brian Andersen	9	9					
10	(Denmark) (2) Hans Nielsen	8	8					
11	(United Kingdom) (7) Mark Loram	7	7					
12	(Australia) (10) Leigh Adams	6	6					
13	(Sweden) (6) Peter Karlsson	4	4					
14	(United Kingdom) (9) Simon Wigg	3	3					
15	(Czech Republic) (16) Tomáš Topinka	2	2					
16	(Poland) (15) Piotr Protasiewicz	1	1					
Rider(s) not classified
	(Sweden) (17) Mikael Karlsson	—	ns					
	(United Kingdom) (18) Andy Smith	—	ns					
Pos.	Rider	Points	CZE (Czech Republic)	SWE (Sweden)	GER (Germany)	GBR (United Kingdom)	POL (Poland)	DEN (Denmark)

== See also ==
- Speedway Grand Prix
- List of Speedway Grand Prix riders
