= 1995 Intercontinental final =

1995 Intercontinental Final

Seasons
- ← 1990 1996 →

The 1995 Intercontinental Final was the seventeenth running of the Intercontinental Final. Previously the IC Final had been the final qualifying stage for Motorcycle speedway riders from Scandinavia, the USA and from the Commonwealth nations for the old single meeting World Final. From 1995 riders from the Intercontinental Final moved into the GP Challenge as part of qualifying for the new Speedway Grand Prix series established in 1995. However, riders would be racing for a place in the following years SGP series and not for the current year.

This was the re-introduction of the Intercontinental Final which had last been run in 1990. From 1991 to 1994 the IC Final was replaced by the World Semi-finals.

== Intercontinental Final ==
- 20 August
- (Norway) Elgane Speedway, Varhaug
- Top 3 plus 1 reserve to GP Challenge
- Peter Karlsson ( (Sweden) ) seeded to GP Challenge
- Jason Crump ( (Australia) ) seeded to 1996 Speedway Grand Prix

Pos.	Rider	Total
1	(Denmark) Brian Karger	13
2	(United Kingdom) Joe Screen	11
3	(Australia) Leigh Adams	10+3
4	(Denmark) Brian Andersen	10+2
5	(United States) Chris Manchester	10+1
6	(Norway) Lars Gunnestad	9
7	(Australia) Shane Parker	9
8	(Finland) Kai Laukkanen	8
9	(Sweden) Stefan Andersson	7
10	(Norway) Rune Holta	7
11	(Australia) Jason Lyons	7
12	(Denmark) Gert Handberg	6
13	(United Kingdom) Martin Dugard	5
14	(Denmark) John Jørgensen	4
15	(Australia) Ryan Sullivan	2
16	(New Zealand) Mark Thorpe	2

== See also ==
- Motorcycle Speedway
