= 1986 Intercontinental final =

1986 Intercontinental Final

Seasons
- ← 1985 1987 →

The 1986 Intercontinental Final was the twelfth running of the Intercontinental Final as part of the qualification for the 1986 Speedway World Championship. The 1986 Final was run on 20 July at the Odsal Stadium in Bradford, England, and was the last qualifying stage for riders from Scandinavia, the USA and from the Commonwealth nations for the World Final to be held at the Silesian Stadium in Chorzów, Poland.

== Intercontinental Final ==
- 20 July
- (United Kingdom) Bradford, Odsal Stadium
- Qualification: Top 11 plus 1 reserve to the World Final in Chorzów, Poland

Pos.	Rider	Total
1	(Denmark) Erik Gundersen	15
2	(Denmark) Hans Nielsen	14
3	(Denmark) Tommy Knudsen	12
4	(England) Neil Evitts	11
5	(England) Kelvin Tatum	8
6	(United States) Sam Ermolenko	8
7	(Sweden) Jimmy Nilsen	8
8	(England) Chris Morton	7
9	(Denmark) Jan O. Pedersen	7
10	(New Zealand) Mitch Shirra	7
11	(England) Marvyn Cox	6+3
12	(Sweden) Jan Andersson	6+2
13	(England) Paul Thorp*	4
14	(England) Jeremy Doncaster	3
15	(Australia) Steve Baker	2
16	(Sweden) Tommy Nilsson	1
R1	(Australia) Phil Crump* (Res)	0
R2	(Denmark) John Jørgensen (Res)	0

* Paul Thorp replaced Kelly Moran. Phil Crump came in as a reserve

== Classification ==
Placing	Rider	Total	1	2	3	4	5	6	7	8	9	10	11	12	13	14	15	16	17	18	19	20	Pts	Pos	21
1	(Denmark) (9) Erik Gundersen	15			3		3						3					3		3			15	1	
2	(Denmark) (14) Hans Nielsen	14				3		3					2		3							3	14	2	
3	(Denmark) (4) Tommy Knudsen	12	2							3				3				2				2	12	3	
4	(United Kingdom) (5) Neil Evitts	11		3			1					3					3					1	11	4	
5	(United Kingdom) (1) Kelvin Tatum	8	3				0				2				0				3				8	5	
6	(United States) (2) Sam Ermolenko	8	1					1				2				3				1			8	6	
7	(Sweden) (8) Jimmy Nilsen	8		2						2			1			2			1				8	7	
8	(New Zealand) (3) Mitch Shirra	7	0						3				0				2				2		7	8	
9	(United Kingdom) (13) Chris Morton	7				0	2							1		1					3		7	9	
10	(Denmark) (6) Jan O. Pedersen	7		0				2			3							1			1		7	10	
11	(United Kingdom) (15) Marvyn Cox	6				1			2			1						0	2				6	11	3
12	(Sweden) (7) Jan Andersson	6		1					0					2	1					2			6	12	2
13	(United Kingdom) (12) Paul Thorp	4			1					1		E			2						0		4	13	
14	(United Kingdom) (16) Jeremy Doncaster	3				2				0	0						1			0			3	14	
15	(Australia) (10) Steve Baker	2			2			X						0			0		0				2	15	
16	(Sweden) (11) Tommy Nilsson	1			0				1		0					0						0	1	16	
R1	(Australia) (R1) Phil Crump	0																					0	R1	
R2	(Denmark) (R2) John Jørgensen	0																					0	R2	
Placing	Rider	Total	1	2	3	4	5	6	7	8	9	10	11	12	13	14	15	16	17	18	19	20	Pts	Pos	21

m - exclusion for exceeding two minute time allowance • t - exclusion for touching the tapes • x - other exclusion • e - retired or mechanical failure • f - fell • ns - non-starter • nc - non-classify

gate A - inside	gate B	gate C	gate D - outside

== See also ==
- Motorcycle Speedway
