= 1988 Intercontinental final =

1988 Intercontinental Final

Seasons
- ← 1987 1989 →

The 1988 Intercontinental Final was the fourteenth running of the Intercontinental Final as part of the qualification for the 1988 Speedway World Championship. The 1988 Final was run on 6 August at the Vetlanda Speedway in Vetlanda, Sweden, and was the last qualifying stage for riders from Scandinavia, the USA and from the Commonwealth nations for the World Final to be held at the Speedway Center in Vojens, Denmark.

== Intercontinental Final ==
- 6 August
- (Sweden) Vetlanda, Vetlanda Speedway
- Qualification: Top 11 plus 1 reserve to the World Final in Vojens, Denmark

Pos.	Rider	Total
1	(Denmark) Jan O. Pedersen	14
2	(Denmark) Hans Nielsen	12+3
3	(Denmark) Erik Gundersen	12+2
4	(Sweden) Per Jonsson	12+1
5	(England) Kelvin Tatum	11
6	(Sweden) Conny Ivarsson	9
7	(England) Chris Morton	8
8	(England) John Davis	8
9	(Denmark) John Jørgensen	7
10	(England) Simon Wigg	7
11	(United States) Sam Ermolenko	7
12	(England) Simon Cross	5
13	(England) Peter Ravn	3
14	(New Zealand) Mitch Shirra	2
15	(England) Marvyn Cox	2
16	(England) Richard Knight	1

== See also ==
- Motorcycle Speedway
