= 1981 Individual Speedway Junior European Championship =

European motorcycle speedway event

European Under-21 Championship
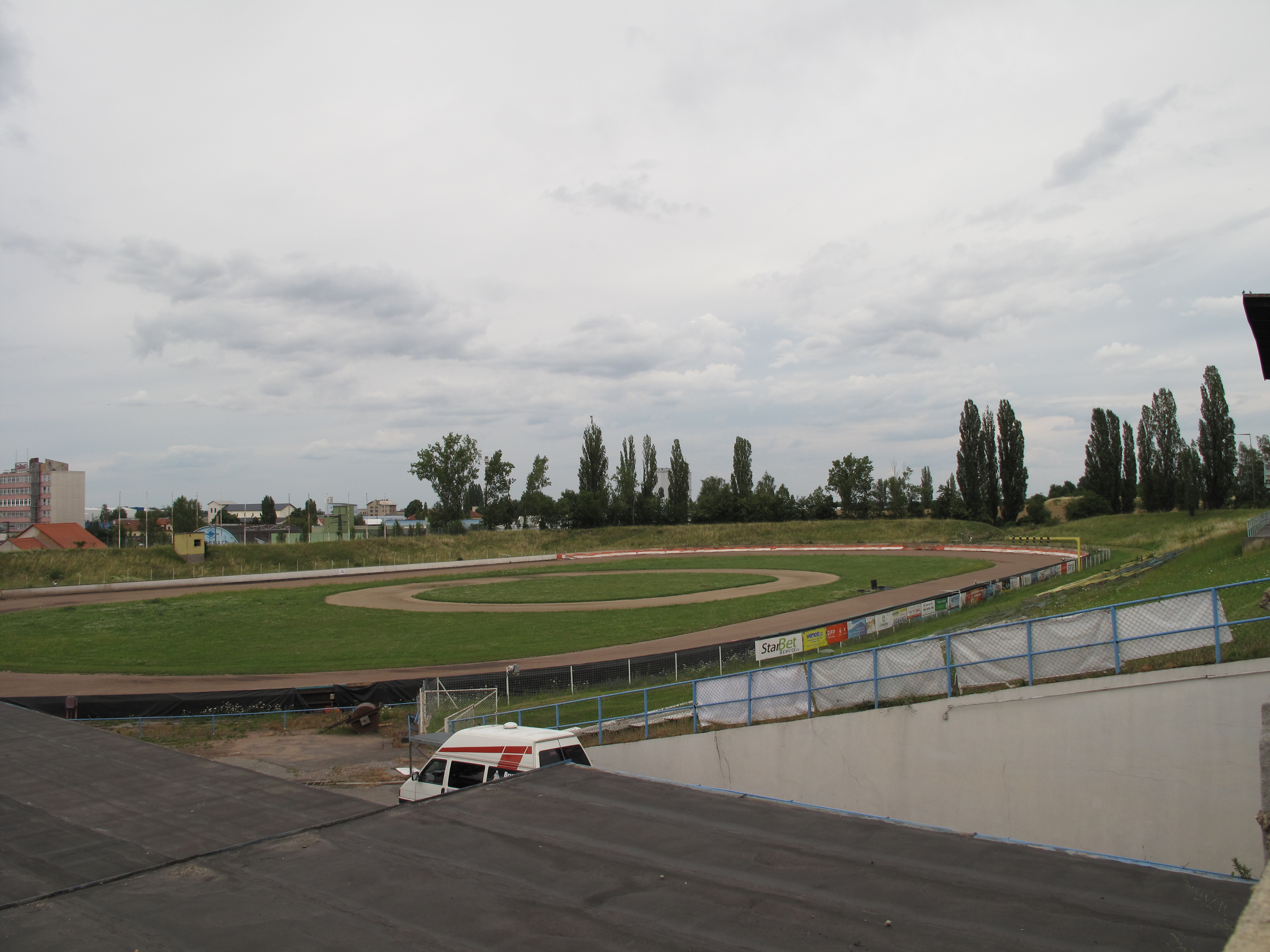
- Slaný hosted the 1981 Championship
- Venue: Slaný Speedway Stadium
- Location: Slaný, Czechoslovakia
- Start date: 18 July 1981

The 1981 Individual Speedway Junior European Championship was the fifth edition of the European Under-21 Championships.

The Championship was won by Shawn Moran.

== European final ==
- 18 July 1981
- (Czechoslovakia) Slaný Speedway Stadium, Slaný

Placing	Rider	Total	1	2	3	4	5	6	7	8	9	10	11	12	13	14	15	16	17	18	19	20	Pts	Pos
1	(United States) (1) Shawn Moran	15	3				3				3				3				3				15	1
2	(Czechoslovakia) (7) Toni Kasper	14		3					3					3	2					3			14	2
3	(Czechoslovakia) (5) Jiri Hrdinak	13		2			2					3					3					3	13	3
4	(Czechoslovakia) (16) Roman Matoušek	10				3				2	2						1			2			10	4
5	(England) (2) Mark Courtney	10	2					3				2				2				1			10	5
6	(Poland) (8) Piotr Podrzycki	9		F						3			3			2			1				9	6
7	(Denmark) (10) Kent Noer	9			2			2						2			2		1				9	7
8	(Poland) (13) Mirosław Berliński	8				1	1							E		3					3		8	8
9	(Czechoslovakia) (11) Lubomír Jedek	8			3				2		1					0						2	8	9
10	(West Germany) (15) Georg Greif	5				2			1			X						2	E				5	10
11	(Denmark) (4) Peter Ravn	5	1							1				1				1				1	5	11
12	(Denmark) (3) Hans Albert Klinge	4	0						0				2				0				2		4	12
13	(Sweden) (6) Anders Eriksson	3		F				-			E							3			E		3	13
14	(Denmark) (9) Flemming Petersen	1			F		F						1					0		0			1	14
15	(Sweden) (14) Roger Gustavsson	0				0		0					E		E							0	0	15
16	(Hungary) (12) Zoltan Adorjan	0			F					0		X			-						-		0	16
17	(Hungary) (17) Zoltan Hajdu	2													1						1		2	17
18	(West Germany) (18) Peter Nieder	1						1															1	18
Placing	Rider	Total	1	2	3	4	5	6	7	8	9	10	11	12	13	14	15	16	17	18	19	20	Pts	Pos

m - exclusion for exceeding two minute time allowance • t - exclusion for touching the tapes • x - other exclusion • e - retired or mechanical failure • f - fell • ns - non-starter • nc - non-classify

gate A - inside	gate B	gate C	gate D - outside
