= 1983 Intercontinental final =

1983 Intercontinental Final

Seasons
- ← 1982 1984 →

The 1983 Intercontinental Final was the ninth running of the Intercontinental Final as part of the qualification for the 1983 Speedway World Championship. The 1983 Final was run on 7 August at the White City Stadium in London, England, and was the last qualifying stage for riders from Scandinavia, the USA and from the Commonwealth nations for the World Final to be held at the Motodrom Halbemond in Norden, West Germany.

== 1983 Intercontinental Final ==
- 7 August
- (United Kingdom) London, White City Stadium
- Qualification: Top 11 plus 1 reserve to the World Final in Norden, West Germany

Pos.	Rider	Total
1	(Denmark) Hans Nielsen	14
2	(England) Michael Lee	12
3	(Denmark) Erik Gundersen	11
4	(England) Kenny Carter	10
5	(United States) Dennis Sigalos	10
6	(Australia) Billy Sanders	10
7	(Denmark) Ole Olsen	9
8	(New Zealand) Mitch Shirra	8
9	(England) Chris Morton	8
10	(United States) Lance King	7
11	(England) Phil Collins	6
12	(Denmark) Peter Ravn	5
13	(Sweden) Jan Andersson	4
14	(Sweden) Pierre Brannefors	3
15	(England) Andy Grahame	2
16	(New Zealand) Larry Ross	1

== See also ==
- Motorcycle Speedway
