= 1985 Intercontinental final =

1985 Intercontinental Final

Seasons
- ← 1984 1986 →

The 1985 Intercontinental Final was the eleventh running of the Intercontinental Final as part of the qualification for the 1985 Speedway World Championship. The 1985 Final was run on 3 August at the Vetlanda Speedway in Vetlanda, Sweden, and was the last qualifying stage for riders from Scandinavia, the USA and from the Commonwealth nations for the World Final to be held at the Odsal Stadium in Bradford, England.

== Intercontinental Final ==
- 3 August
- (Sweden) Vetlanda, Vetlanda Speedway
- Qualification: Top 11 plus 1 reserve to the World Final in Bradford, England

Pos.	Rider	Total
1	(United States) Shawn Moran	14
2	(United States) Lance King	12+3
3	(Denmark) Hans Nielsen	12+2
4	(Sweden) Jan Andersson	11
5	(Finland) Kai Niemi	10
6	(Denmark) Tommy Knudsen	9
7	(United States) Sam Ermolenko	9
8	(England) Kelvin Tatum	8
9	(United States) John Cook	8
10	(Denmark) Erik Gundersen	7
11	(Denmark) Jan O. Pedersen	6
12	(England) Phil Collins	5
13	(England) John Davis	3
14	(England) Andy Smith	2
15	(Australia) Phil Crump	2
16	(England) Kenny Carter	2
R1	(Denmark) John Jørgensen	0
R2	(England) Chris Morton	0

== See also ==
- Motorcycle Speedway
