= 2000 Intercontinental final =

2000 Intercontinental Final

Seasons
- ← 1999 2001 →

The 2000 Intercontinental Final was the twenty-second running of the Intercontinental Final and was the second last qualifying stage for Motorcycle speedway riders to qualify for the 2001 Speedway Grand Prix series. The Final was run on 12 August at the Holsted Speedway Center in Holsted, Denmark.

== Intercontinental Final ==
- 12 August
- (Denmark) Holsted, Holsted Speedway Center
- First place to 2001 Speedway Grand Prix
- Riders 2-7 plus 1 reserve to GP Challenge

Pos.	Rider	Total
1	(Sweden) Niklas Klingberg	14
2	(Norway) Rune Holta	12
3	(Denmark) Nicki Pedersen	11
4	(Australia) Jason Lyons	10
5	(Denmark) John Jørgensen	9+3
6	(Denmark) Jesper B Jensen	9+2
7	(United Kingdom) Gary Havelock	9+1
8	(Australia) Steve Johnston	9+0
9	(United Kingdom) Sean Wilson	8
10	(Denmark) Bjarne Pedersen	7
11	(United Kingdom) Paul Hurry	7
12	(United Kingdom) Martin Dugard	4
13	(Sweden) Stefan Andersson	3
14	(Norway) Lars Gunnestad	3
15	(United Kingdom) David Howe	2
16	(Finland) Kai Laukkanen (Res)	2
17	(United Kingdom) Shaun Tacey (Res)	1
18	(United States) Sam Ermolenko	0
