= 1984 Intercontinental final =

1984 Intercontinental Final

Seasons
- ← 1983 1985 →

The 1984 Intercontinental Final was the tenth running of the Intercontinental Final as part of the qualification for the 1984 Speedway World Championship. The 1984 Final was run on 20 July at the Speedway Center in Vojens, Denmark, and was the last qualifying stage for riders from Scandinavia, the USA and from the Commonwealth nations for the World Final to be held at the Ullevi stadium in Gothenburg, Sweden.

== 1984 Intercontinental Final ==
- 20 July
- (Denmark) Vojens, Vojens Speedway Center
- Qualification: Top 11 plus 1 reserve to the World Final in Gothenburg, Sweden

| Pos. | Rider | Total |
|---|---|---|
| 1 | (United States) Shawn Moran | 13 |
| 2 | (England) Simon Wigg | 12 |
| 3 | (United States) Lance King | 11 |
| 4 | (Denmark) Bo Petersen | 9 |
| 5 | (New Zealand) Mitch Shirra | 9 |
| 6 | (Finland) Kai Niemi | 8 |
| 7 | (Denmark) Hans Nielsen | 8 |
| 8 | (United States) Kelly Moran | 8 |
| 9 | (Denmark) Erik Gundersen | 8 |
| 10 | (Australia) Billy Sanders | 7 |
| 11 | (Sweden) Jan Andersson | 6+3 |
| 12 | (England) Alan Grahame | 6+2 |
| 13 | (England) Kenny Carter | 6+1 |
| 14 | (Australia) Phil Crump | 5 |
| 15 | (New Zealand) Larry Ross | 1 |
| 16 | (Sweden) Mikael Blixt | 1 |

== See also ==
- Motorcycle Speedway
