= 1981 Intercontinental final =

1981 Intercontinental Final

Seasons
- ← 1980 1982 →

The 1981 Intercontinental Final was the seventh running of the Intercontinental Final as part of the qualification for the 1981 Speedway World Championship. The 1981 Final was run on 5 July on a wet night at the Speedway Center (owned by triple World Champion Ole Olsen) in Vojens, Denmark, and was the last qualifying stage for riders from Scandinavia, the USA and from the Commonwealth nations for the World Final to be held at the Wembley Stadium in London, England.

American star Bruce Penhall signalled his intentions by dominating the meeting with a 15-point maximum in difficult conditions. Rising Danes Erik Gundersen (Penhall's team mate at Cradley Heath) and Hans Nielsen delighted the home crowd by finishing in second and third with Nielsen defeating Kenny Carter in a runoff for third place. Considered something of a spent force as he was nearing the end of his career, but racing on the track that he part owns (English television commentator Dave Lanning called it a swamp due to the conditions), Ole Olsen also gave the crowd in Vojens something to cheer as he scored 6 points to claim the final spot in the World Final at Wembley. In another bonus for Danish speedway, 1980 European Under-21 Champion Tommy Knudsen made it four Danes going to the World Final when he finished in 6th place, while another local Preben Eriksen claimed the World Final reserve spot. The other World Final qualifiers were Dave Jessup, Jan Andersson, Chris Morton, Larry Ross and reigning World Champion Michael Lee.

The meeting was controversial. The notorious weather in Vojens struck and after the first round of heats the riders voted 14-2 not to return to the track due to the wet conditions (only track owner Olsen and Hans Nielsen wanted to continue). After a 90-minute delay the FIM referee threatened the riders with disqualification from the meeting if they did not continue racing. A compromise was eventually reached and the track was tested by two local junior riders, following which the meeting resumed, though the riders continued to voice their concerns led by Penhall despite he being the one rider who seemed to come to grips with the conditions, and six time World Champion Ivan Mauger. After the meeting both Penhall and Mauger publicly criticised the Polish referee on British television for not listening to the riders about the condition of the track, with Mauger claiming that the referee feigned not being able to speak English when he refused to speak to the riders (Mauger contended that he had dealt with this particular referee in the past and that he did indeed speak English).

- 5 July
- (Denmark) Vojens, Vojens Speedway Center
- Qualification: top 11 plus 1 reserve to the world final in London, England

Pos.	Rider	Total
1	(United States) Bruce Penhall	15
2	(Denmark) Erik Gundersen	12
3	(Denmark) Hans Nielsen	11+3
4	(England) Kenny Carter	11+2
5	(England) Dave Jessup	10
6	(Denmark) Tommy Knudsen	9
7	(England) Michael Lee	8
8	(Sweden) Jan Andersson	8
9	(England) Chris Morton	8
10	(New Zealand) Larry Ross	7
11	(Denmark) Ole Olsen	6
12	(Denmark) Preben Eriksen	5
13	(New Zealand) Ivan Mauger	4
14	(England) John Louis	4
15	(United States) Dennis Sigalos	1
16	(United States) Kelly Moran	0

== See also ==
- Motorcycle Speedway
