= 1979 Intercontinental final =

1979 Intercontinental Final

Seasons
- ← 1978 1980 →

The 1979 Intercontinental Final was the fifth running of the Intercontinental Final as part of the qualification for the 1979 Speedway World Championship. The 1979 Final was run on 5 August at the White City Stadium in London, England, and was the last qualifying stage for riders from Scandinavia, the USA and from the Commonwealth nations for the World Final to be held at the Silesian Stadium in Chorzów, Poland.

In front of their home crowd, the 20-year-old sensation Michael Lee and the 1976 World Champion Peter Collins dominated the meeting. Lee defeated Collins in a runoff after both finished on 14 points. Four points behind them was Denmark's Finn Thomsen, who secured third place after defeating Dave Jessup and Ivan Mauger in a runoff. Notably, Mauger would go on to make history in Poland, winning his record 6th Individual World Championship.

Surprising non-qualifiers for the World Final were England's Gordon Kennett (who had finished second in the 1978 World Final at Wembley) and Finland's Kai Niemi. Both riders were part of the British League club White City, with the 380 metres (420 yards) White City Stadium being their home track.

== 1979 Intercontinental Final ==
- 8 August
- (United Kingdom) London, White City Stadium
- Qualification: Top 9 plus 1 reserve to the World Final in Chorzów, Poland

Pos.	Rider	Total
1	(England) Michael Lee	14+3
2	(England) Peter Collins	14+2
3	(Denmark) Finn Thomsen	10+3
4	(England) Dave Jessup	10+2
5	(New Zealand) Ivan Mauger	10+1
6	(Denmark) Ole Olsen	9
7	(United States) Kelly Moran*	8
8	(Australia) Billy Sanders	8
9	(Australia) John Titman	8
10	(New Zealand) Larry Ross	7
11	(Finland) Kai Niemi	6
12	(England) Gordon Kennett	5
13	(England) John Davis	4
14	(United States) Bobby Schwartz	2
15	(Denmark) Hans Nielsen	2
16	(England) Malcolm Simmons (Res)	2
17	(Sweden) Jan Andersson	1

Kelly Moran replaced Mike Bast

== See also ==
- Motorcycle Speedway
