= Fjelsted =

- Village
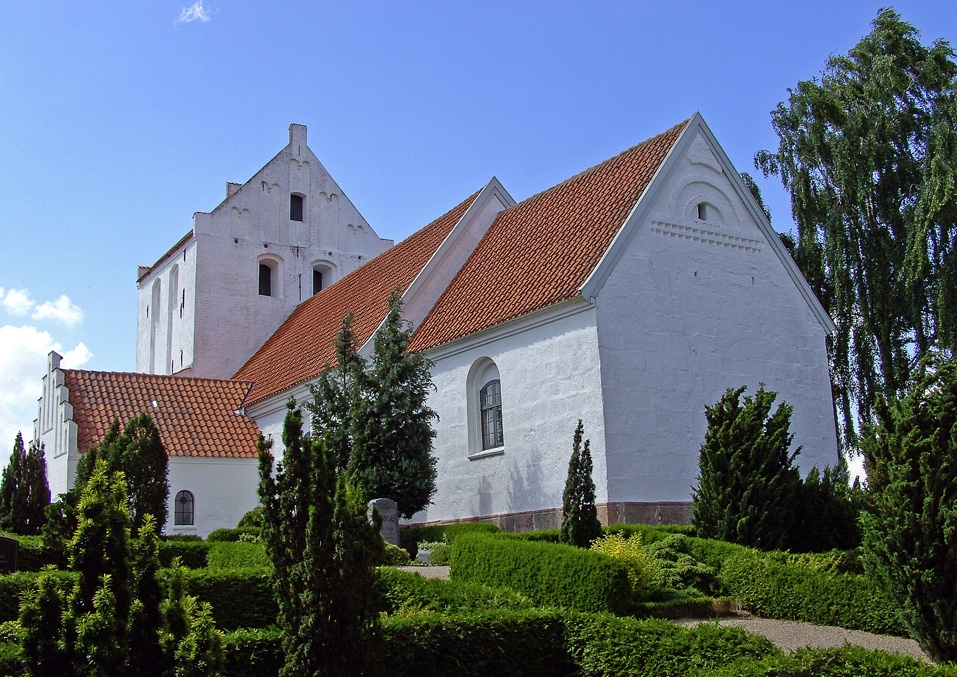
- Fjelsted Church

- Location in the Region of Southern Denmark
- Coordinates: 55°26′27″N 10°0′48″E
- Country: Denmark
- Region: Southern Denmark
- Municipality: Middelfart

Population (2026)
  - Total: 282
- Time zone: UTC+1 (CET)
  - Summer (DST): UTC+2 (CEST)
- Postal code: 5463 Harndrup

Fjelsted is a village, with a population of 282 (1 January 2026), situated on the island of Funen in Middelfart Municipality, Region of Southern Denmark in Denmark. Fjelsted is located next to the Funen Motorway three kilometers south of Harndrup, 20 kilometers east of Middelfart and 28 kilometers west of Odense.

Fjelsted Church is located in the centre of the village.

== Sport ==
The village includes the Speedway stadium known as the Fjelsted Speedway Stadium, which is the home of Fjelsted Speedway Klub who race in the Danish Speedway League.
