= Intercontinental final =

International motorcycle speedway competition

Intercontinental final (World Championship qualifier)
- Sport: Motorcycle speedway
- Founded: 1975

The Intercontinental final was a Motorcycle speedway final sanctioned by the FIM as the final qualifying round for the Speedway World Championship between 1975 and 2001.

After being introduced in 1975, it replaced the European final as the final qualifying round for Commonwealth, American and Nordic riders in 1976.

The Intercontinental final was not run from 1991 to 1994 when it was replaced by the World Semi-finals. It returned to the World Championship calendar in 1995, though unlike from 1975 to 1991 riders would be vying for a place in the following years Speedway Grand Prix World Championship series and not for the current year World final.

Peter Collins (1976), Ole Olsen (1978) and Bruce Penhall (1981) are the only riders who won the Intercontinental final to go on and win the World Championship in the same year. Collins (1977) and Erik Gundersen (1986) are the only reigning World Champions to win the Intercontinental final.

== Editions ==
Year	Venue	Winner	Runner-up	3rd place
1975	(Sweden) Gothenburg Ullevi	(New Zealand) Ivan Mauger	(Sweden) Anders Michanek	(Sweden) Bernt Persson
1976	(England) London Wembley Stadium	(England) Peter Collins	(New Zealand) Ivan Mauger	(Australia) Phil Crump
1977	(England) London White City Stadium	(England) Peter Collins	(Denmark) Ole Olsen	(Australia) Billy Sanders
1978	(Denmark) Fredericia Fredericia Stadion	(Denmark) Ole Olsen	(New Zealand) Ivan Mauger	(United States) Scott Autrey
1979	(England) London White City Stadium	(England) Michael Lee	(England) Peter Collins	(Denmark) Finn Thomsen
1980	(England) London White City Stadium	(England) Chris Morton	(United States) Bruce Penhall	(Australia) Billy Sanders
1981	(Denmark) Vojens Vojens Speedway Center	(United States) Bruce Penhall	(Denmark) Erik Gundersen	(Denmark) Hans Nielsen
1982	(Sweden) Vetlanda Vetlanda Motorstadion	(England) Les Collins	(England) Kenny Carter	(United States) Dennis Sigalos
1983	(England) London White City Stadium	(Denmark) Hans Nielsen	(England) Michael Lee	(Denmark) Erik Gundersen
1984	(Denmark) Vojens Vojens Speedway Center	(United States) Shawn Moran	(England) Simon Wigg	(United States) Lance King
1985	(Sweden) Vetlanda Vetlanda Motorstadion	(United States) Shawn Moran	(United States) Lance King	(Denmark) Hans Nielsen
1986	(England) Bradford Odsal Stadium	(Denmark) Erik Gundersen	(Denmark) Hans Nielsen	(Denmark) Tommy Knudsen
1987	(Denmark) Vojens Vojens Speedway Center	(Denmark) Erik Gundersen	(Sweden) Jimmy Nilsen	(Denmark) Hans Nielsen
1988	(Sweden) Vetlanda Vetlanda Motorstadion	(Denmark) Jan O. Pedersen	(Denmark) Hans Nielsen	(Denmark) Erik Gundersen
1989	(England) Bradford Odsal Stadium	(England) Kelvin Tatum	(Denmark) Erik Gundersen	(Denmark) Hans Nielsen
1990	(Denmark) Harndrup Fjelsted Speedway Stadium	(United States) Shawn Moran	(Sweden) Per Jonsson	(Denmark) Hans Nielsen
1991-94	not held because format changed to World Semi finals			
1995	(Norway) Varhaug Elgane Speedway	(Denmark) Brian Karger	(England) Joe Screen	(Australia) Leigh Adams
1996	(Denmark) Holsted Holsted Speedway Center	(Sweden) Jimmy Nilsen	(Denmark) Brian Andersen	(Germany) Gerd Riss
1997	(Sweden) Västervik Ljungheden	(Australia) Ryan Sullivan	(Australia) Jason Crump	(Australia) Craig Boyce
1998	(Denmark) Vojens Vojens Speedway Center	(Denmark) Brian Karger	(Sweden) Peter Karlsson	(United States) Sam Ermolenko
1999	(England) Poole Wimborne Road	(Australia) Todd Wiltshire	(England) Gary Havelock	(Finland) Kai Laukkanen
2000	(Denmark) Holsted Holsted Speedway Center	(Sweden) Niklas Klingberg	(Norway) Rune Holta	(Denmark) Nicki Pedersen
2001	(Sweden) Västervik Ljungheden	(Finland) Kai Laukkanen	(England) Scott Nicholls	(Sweden) Andreas Jonsson

=== Winners by country ===
Country	Wins	Winner(s)
Denmark	7	Erik Gundersen (2), Brian Karger (2), Ole Olsen (1), Hans Nielsen (1), Jan O. Pedersen (1)
England	6	Peter Collins (2), Michael Lee (1), Chris Morton (1), Les Collins (1), Kelvin Tatum (1)
United States	4	Shawn Moran (3), Bruce Penhall (1)
Sweden	2	Jimmy Nilsen (1), Niklas Klingberg (1)
Australia	2	Ryan Sullivan (1), Todd Wiltshire (1)
New Zealand	1	Ivan Mauger (1)
Finland	2	Kai Laukkanen (1)

== See also ==
- Speedway World Championship
- Speedway Grand Prix
- Motorcycle speedway
