= 1987 Intercontinental final =

1987 Intercontinental Final

Seasons
- ← 1986 1988 →

The 1987 Intercontinental Final was the thirteenth running of the Intercontinental Final as part of the qualification for the 1987 Speedway World Championship. The 1987 Final was run on 26 July at the Speedway Center in Vojens, Denmark, and was the last qualifying stage for riders from Scandinavia, the USA and from the Commonwealth nations for the World Final to be held at the Amsterdam Olympic Stadium in the Netherlands.

== Intercontinental Final ==
- 26 July
- (Denmark) Vojens, Speedway Center
- Qualification: Top 11 plus 1 reserve to the World Final in Amsterdam, Netherlands

Pos.	Rider	Total
1	(Denmark) Erik Gundersen	13
2	(Sweden) Jimmy Nilsen	12
3	(Denmark) Hans Nielsen	11
4	(Denmark) Jan O. Pedersen	10
5	(New Zealand) Mitch Shirra	9
6	(United States) Sam Ermolenko	9
7	(United States) John Cook	9
8	(Sweden) Per Jonsson	8
9	(England) Simon Cross	8
10	(England) Jeremy Doncaster	8
11	(England) Chris Morton	7
12	(Denmark) Peter Ravn	5+3
13	(England) Neil Evitts	5+2
14	(Finland) Kai Niemi	4
15	(England) Marvyn Cox	1
16	(England) Kelvin Tatum (Res)	1
17	(Australia) Steve Regeling	0
18	(Denmark) John Jørgensen (Res)	0

== See also ==
- Motorcycle Speedway
