= 2001 Intercontinental final =

2001 Intercontinental Final

Seasons
- ← 2000 none →

The 2001 Intercontinental Final was the twenty-third and last running of the Intercontinental Final and was the second last qualifying stage for Motorcycle speedway riders to qualify for the 2001 Speedway Grand Prix series. The Final was run on 11 August at the Västervik Speedway in Västervik, Sweden

== Intercontinental Final ==
- 11 August
- (Sweden) Västervik, Västervik Speedway
- Top 9 to GP Challenge

| Pos. | Rider | Total |
|---|---|---|
| 1 | (Finland) Kai Laukkanen | 12+3 |
| 2 | (United Kingdom) Scott Nicholls | 12+2 |
| 3 | (Sweden) Andreas Jonsson | 11 |
| 4 | (United Kingdom) Sean Wilson | 10 |
| 5 | (Australia) Jason Lyons | 13 |
| 6 | (Norway) Lars Gunnestad | 9 |
| 7 | (United States) Sam Ermolenko | 8+3 |
| 8 | (United Kingdom) Gary Havelock | 8+2 |
| 9 | (Sweden) Stefan Andersson | 8+1 |
| 10 | (Denmark) Hans Clausen | 8+0 |
| 11 | (United Kingdom) Stuart Robson | 6 |
| 12 | (Sweden) Niklas Karlsson | 5 |
| 13 | (Australia) Steve Johnston | 4 |
| 14 | (United States) John Cook | 4 |
| 15 | (Denmark) Jesper B Jensen | 4 |
| 16 | (Finland) Kauko Nieminen | 2 |
| 17 | (Denmark) Bjarne Pedersen (Res) | 0 |
