= 1997 Intercontinental final =

1997 Intercontinental Final

Seasons
- ← 1996 1998 →

The 1997 Intercontinental Final was the nineteenth running of the Intercontinental Final and was the second last qualifying stage for Motorcycle speedway riders to qualify for the 1998 Speedway Grand Prix series. The Final was run on 26 July at the Västervik Speedway in Västervik, Sweden

== Intercontinental Final ==
- 26 July
- (Sweden) Västervik, Västervik Speedway
- Top 2 to 1998 Speedway Grand Prix
- Riders 3-7 plus 1 reserve to GP Challenge

Pos.	Rider	Total
1	(Australia) Ryan Sullivan	13
2	(Australia) Jason Crump	12+3
3	(Australia) Craig Boyce	12+2
4	(United Kingdom) Kelvin Tatum	11
5	(Sweden) Stefan Dannö	10
6	(United Kingdom) Joe Screen	9
7	(United States) Sam Ermolenko	8+3
8	(Denmark) Ronni Pedersen	8+2
9	(Sweden) Stefan Andersson	8+1
10	(Sweden) Peter Nahlin	7
11	(Finland) Kai Laukkanen	6
12	(Denmark) Frede Schött	5
13	(Denmark) John Jørgensen	5
14	(United Kingdom) Sean Wilson	3
15	(United Kingdom) Gary Havelock	2
16	(Norway) Rune Holta (Res)	2
17	(Denmark) Jesper B. Jensen	0
18	(Sweden) Niklas Klingberg (Res)	0
