= 2003 Individual Speedway European Championship =

Motorcycle racing competition

Seasons
- ← 2002 2004 →

The 2003 Individual Speedway European Championship

== Qualification ==
- Semi-final A:
  - June 7, 2003
  - (Italy) Lonigo
- Semi-final B:
  - July 19, 2003
  - (Ukraine) Lviv
- Scandinavian Final (semi-final C):
  - June 6, 2003
  - (Denmark) Outrup

== Final ==
- August 30, 2003
- (Czech Republic) Slaný Speedway Stadium, Slaný

Placing	Rider	Total	1	2	3	4	5	6	7	8	9	10	11	12	13	14	15	16	17	18	19	20	Pts	Pos	21
1	(Poland) (11) Krzysztof Kasprzak	12			3				2		1					3						3	12	1	3
2	(Poland) (1) Sławomir Drabik	12	3				3				2				1				3				12	2	2
3	(Sweden) (12) Magnus Zetterström	11			0					3		3			3						2		11	3	
4	(Slovenia) (14) Matej Žagar	10				2		3					1		2							2	10	4	
5	(Ukraine) (6) Ihor Marko	9		2				1			3							3			0		9	5	
6	(Poland) (15) Rafał Szombierski	9				3			3			2						1	0				9	6	
7	(Denmark) (10) Charlie Gjedde	9			1			2						1			3		2				9	7	
8	(France) (13) Sebastian Tresarrieu	8				0	2							2		1					3		8	8	
9	(Poland) (9) Andrzej Huszcza	8			2		1						E					2		3			8	9	
10	(Sweden) (5) Peter I. Karlsson	7		3			0					1					2					1	7	10	
11	(Czech Republic) (4) Antonín Šváb Jr.	6	1							2				3				0				0	6	11	
12	(Poland) (8) Krzysztof Jabloński	6		0						X			3			2			1				6	12	
13	(Denmark) (3) Niels Kristian Iversen	6	2						1				2				F				1		6	13	
14	(Czech Republic) (7) Richard Wolff	3		1					0					0	0					2			3	14	
15	(Hungary) (16) Attila Stefani	3				1				1	0						1			E			3	15	
16	(Italy) (2) Andrea Maida	1	0					0				0				0				1			1	16	
R1	(Czech Republic) (R1) Josef Franc	0																					0	R1	
	(R2) None	0																					0		
Placing	Rider	Total	1	2	3	4	5	6	7	8	9	10	11	12	13	14	15	16	17	18	19	20	Pts	Pos	21

m - exclusion for exceeding two minute time allowance • t - exclusion for touching the tapes • x - other exclusion • e - retired or mechanical failure • f - fell • ns - non-starter • nc - non-classify

gate A - inside	gate B	gate C	gate D - outside
