= 1999 Intercontinental final =

1999 Intercontinental Final

Seasons
- ← 1998 2000 →

The 1999 Intercontinental Final was the twenty-first running of the Intercontinental Final and was the second last qualifying stage for Motorcycle speedway riders to qualify for the 2000 Speedway Grand Prix series. The Final was run on 18 July at the Poole Stadium in Poole, England.

== Intercontinental Final ==
- 18 July
- (United Kingdom) Poole, Poole Stadium
- First place to 2000 Speedway Grand Prix
- Riders 2-7 plus 1 reserve to GP Challenge

Pos.	Rider	Total
1	(Australia) Todd Wiltshire	14
2	(United Kingdom) Gary Havelock	12
3	(Finland) Kai Laukkanen	11
4	(United Kingdom) Mark Loram	10
5	(Norway) Rune Holta	9
6	(United Kingdom) Scott Nicholls	8
7	(Australia) Jason Lyons	7+3
8	(United Kingdom) Carl Stonehewer	7+2
9	(Sweden) Niklas Klingberg	7+1
10	(Denmark) Gert Handberg	7+0
11	(Sweden) Peter Nahlin	6
12	(United Kingdom) Sean Wilson	6
13	(Denmark) Jesper B Jensen	6
14	(Denmark) Ronni Pedersen	5
15	(United Kingdom) Paul Hurry	3
16	(Sweden) Per Wester	2
17	(Denmark) Charlie Gjedde (Res)	0
18	(Finland) Vesa Ylinen (Res)	0
