= 1998 Intercontinental final =

1998 Intercontinental Final

Seasons
- ← 1997 1999 →

The 1998 Intercontinental Final was the twentieth running of the Intercontinental Final and was the second last qualifying stage for Motorcycle speedway riders to qualify for the 1999 Speedway Grand Prix series. The Final was run on 21 August at the Speedway Center in Vojens, Denmark

== Intercontinental Final ==
- 20 August
- (Denmark) Vojens, Speedway Center
- Top 2 to 1999 Speedway Grand Prix
- Riders 3-8 plus 1 reserve to GP Challenge

Pos.	Rider	Total
1	(Denmark) Brian Karger	14+3
2	(Sweden) Peter Karlsson	14+2
3	(United States) Sam Ermolenko	11
4	(United Kingdom) Joe Screen	9
5	(Denmark) John Jørgensen	5
6	(United Kingdom) Gary Havelock	8+3
7	(Denmark) Nicki Pedersen	8+2
8	(Sweden) Mikael Karlsson	8+1
9	(Denmark) Ronni Pedersen	8+0
10	(Australia) Jason Lyons	6
11	(Norway) Lars Gunnestad	6
12	(Sweden) Peter Nahlin	6
13	(United Kingdom) Paul Hurry	6
14	(United Kingdom) Kelvin Tatum	4
15	(Australia) Mark Lemon	3
16	(United Kingdom) Glenn Cunningham	1
