= 1989 Intercontinental final =

Individual Speedway World Championship

1989 Intercontinental Final

Seasons
- ← 1988 1990 →

The 1989 Intercontinental Final was the fifteenth running of the Intercontinental Final as part of the qualification for the 1989 Speedway World Championship. The 1989 Final was run on 13 August at the Odsal Stadium in Bradford, England, and was the last qualifying stage for riders from Scandinavia, the USA and from the Commonwealth nations for the World Final to be held at the Olympic Stadium in Munich, West Germany.

== Intercontinental Final ==
- 13 August
- (United Kingdom) Bradford, Odsal Stadium
- Qualification: Top 11 plus 1 reserve to the World Final in Munich, West Germany

Pos.	Rider	Total
1	(England) Kelvin Tatum	13+3
2	(Denmark) Erik Gundersen	13+2
3	(Denmark) Hans Nielsen	12+3
4	(New Zealand) Mitch Shirra	12+2
5	(Denmark) Jan O. Pedersen	9
6	(England) Simon Wigg	9
7	(Sweden) Tony Olsson	8
8	(England) Jeremy Doncaster	7
9	(England) Andy Smith	6
10	(Finland) Olli Tyrväinen	5+3
11	(United States) Ronnie Correy	5+2
12	(Australia) Troy Butler*	5+1
13	(England) Andy Grahame	5+0
14	(Denmark) Peter Ravn	4
15	(England) Andy Grahame	3
16	(Denmark) John Jörgensen	3
R1	(England) Martin Dugard	1
R2	(Sweden) Eric Stenlund	0

*Troy Butler replaced the injured Sam Ermolenko. Martin Dugard came in as the reserve rider.

== See also ==
- Motorcycle Speedway
