= 1980 Individual Speedway Junior European Championship =

European motorcycle speedway event

European Under-21 Championship
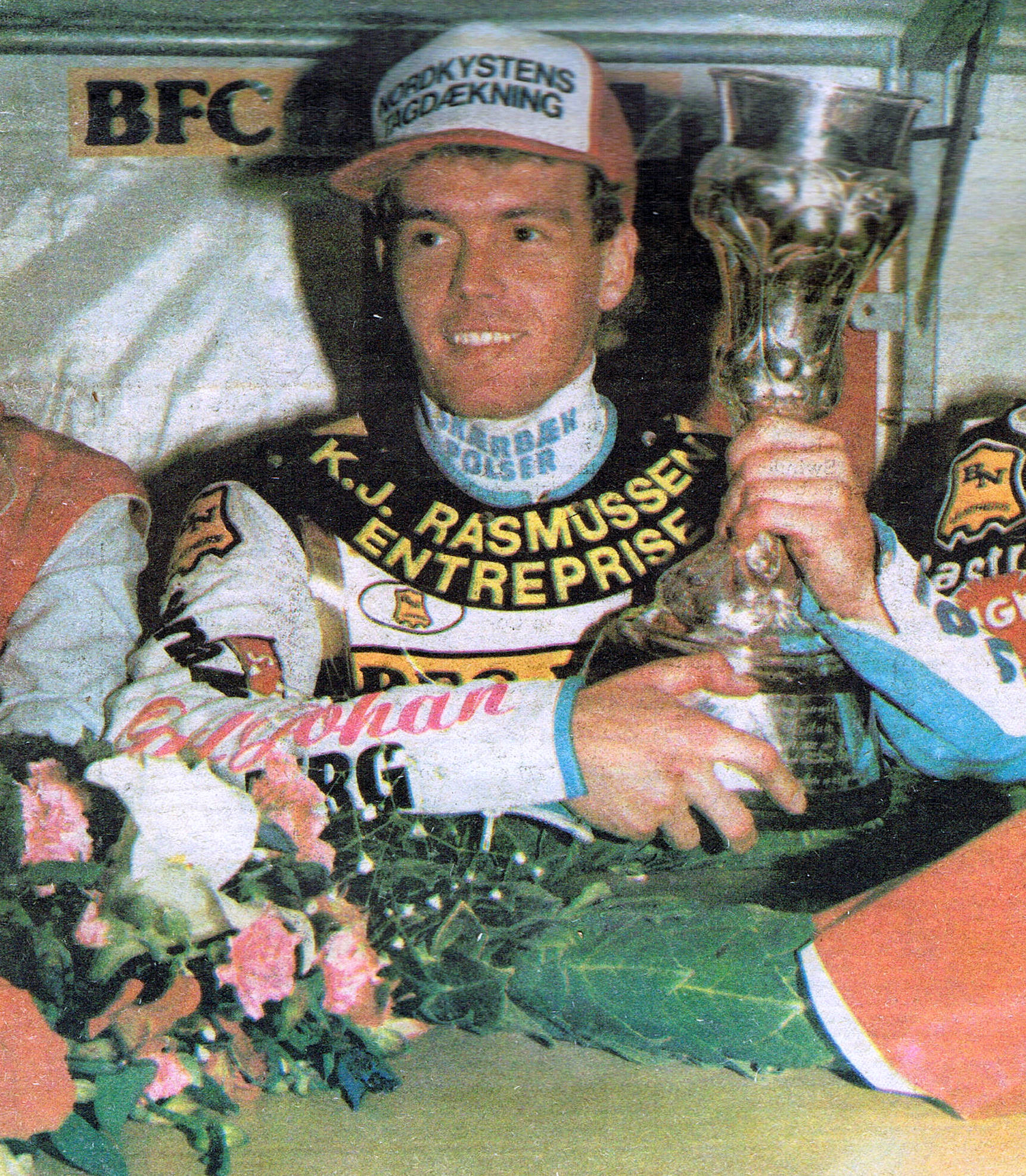
- Tommy Knudsen won the 1980 event
- Venue: Rottalstadion
- Location: Pocking, West Germany
- Start date: 20 July 1980

The 1980 Individual Speedway Junior European Championship was the fourth edition of the European Under-21 Championships.

The Championship was won by Tommy Knudsen.

== European final ==
- 20 July 1980
- (West Germany) Rottalstadion, Pocking

| Placing | Rider | Total | 1 | 2 | 3 | 4 | 5 | 6 | 7 | 8 | 9 | 10 | 11 | 12 | 13 | 14 | 15 | 16 | 17 | 18 | 19 | 20 | Pts | Pos | 21 |
|---|---|---|---|---|---|---|---|---|---|---|---|---|---|---|---|---|---|---|---|---|---|---|---|---|---|
| 1 | (Denmark) (14) Tommy Knudsen | 14 | | | | 3 | | 3 | | | | | 2 | | 3 | | | | | | | 3 | 14 | 1 | |
| 2 | (New Zealand) (1) Tony Briggs | 12 | 3 | | | | 3 | | | | 2 | | | | 2 | | | | 2 | | | | 12 | 2 | |
| 3 | (United States) (15) Dennis Sigalos | 11 | | | | X | | | 2 | | | 3 | | | | | | 3 | 3 | | | | 11 | 3 | 3 |
| 4 | (Denmark) (11) Erik Gundersen | 11 | | | 3 | | | | 3 | | 1 | | | | | 3 | | | | | | 1 | 11 | 4 | 2 |
| 5 | (Finland) (10) Ari Koponen | 9 | | | 1 | | | 2 | | | | | | 3 | | | 3 | | 0 | | | | 9 | 5 | |
| 6 | (Poland) (16) Marek Kępa | 9 | | | | 2 | | | | 1 | 3 | | | | | | 0 | | | 3 | | | 9 | 6 | |
| 7 | (England) (4) Neil Evitts | 9 | 2 | | | | | | | 2 | | | | 1 | | | | 2 | | | | 2 | 9 | 7 | |
| 8 | (England) (12) Nigel Flatman | 8 | | | 0 | | | | | 3 | | 2 | | | 1 | | | | | | 2 | | 8 | 8 | |
| 9 | (Czechoslovakia) (8) Antonín Kasper Jr. | 6 | | E | | | | | | 0 | | | 3 | | | 2 | | | 1 | | | | 6 | 9 | |
| 10 | (West Germany) (3) Josef Aigner | 6 | F | | | | | | 0 | | | | 1 | | | | 2 | | | | 3 | | 6 | 10 | |
| 11 | (Sweden) (5) Lars Hammarberg | 5 | | 3 | | | 1 | | | | | X | | | | | 0 | | | | | 1 | 5 | 11 | |
| 12 | (West Germany) (13) Christian Brandt | 5 | | | | 1 | 2 | | | | | | | 0 | | 1 | | | | | 1 | | 5 | 12 | |
| 13 | (Soviet Union) (2) Rif Saitgareev | 5 | 1 | | | | | 1 | | | | 1 | | | | 0 | | | | 2 | | | 5 | 13 | |
| 14 | (Poland) (6) Mirosław Berliński | 3 | | 2 | | | | E | | | 0 | | | | | | | 1 | | | X | | 3 | 14 | |
| 15 | (United States) (9) Shawn Moran | 2 | | | 2 | | 0 | | | | | | 0 | | | | | E | | - | | | 2 | 15 | |
| 16 | (Denmark) (7) Klaus Lohmann | 0 | | F | | | | | - | | | | | - | - | | | | | - | | | 0 | 16 | |
| 17 | (Denmark) (17) Hans Albert Klinge | 4 | | 1 | | | | | 1 | | | | | 2 | 0 | | | | | X | | | 4 | 17 | |
| 18 | (Hungary) (18) Zoltan Hajdu | 0 | | | | | | | | | | | | | | | | | | E | | | 0 | 18 | |
| Placing | Rider | Total | 1 | 2 | 3 | 4 | 5 | 6 | 7 | 8 | 9 | 10 | 11 | 12 | 13 | 14 | 15 | 16 | 17 | 18 | 19 | 20 | Pts | Pos | 21 |

m - exclusion for exceeding two minute time allowance • t - exclusion for touching the tapes • x - other exclusion • e - retired or mechanical failure • f - fell • ns - non-starter • nc - non-classify

| gate A - inside | gate B | gate C | gate D - outside |
