= Harndrup =

- Village
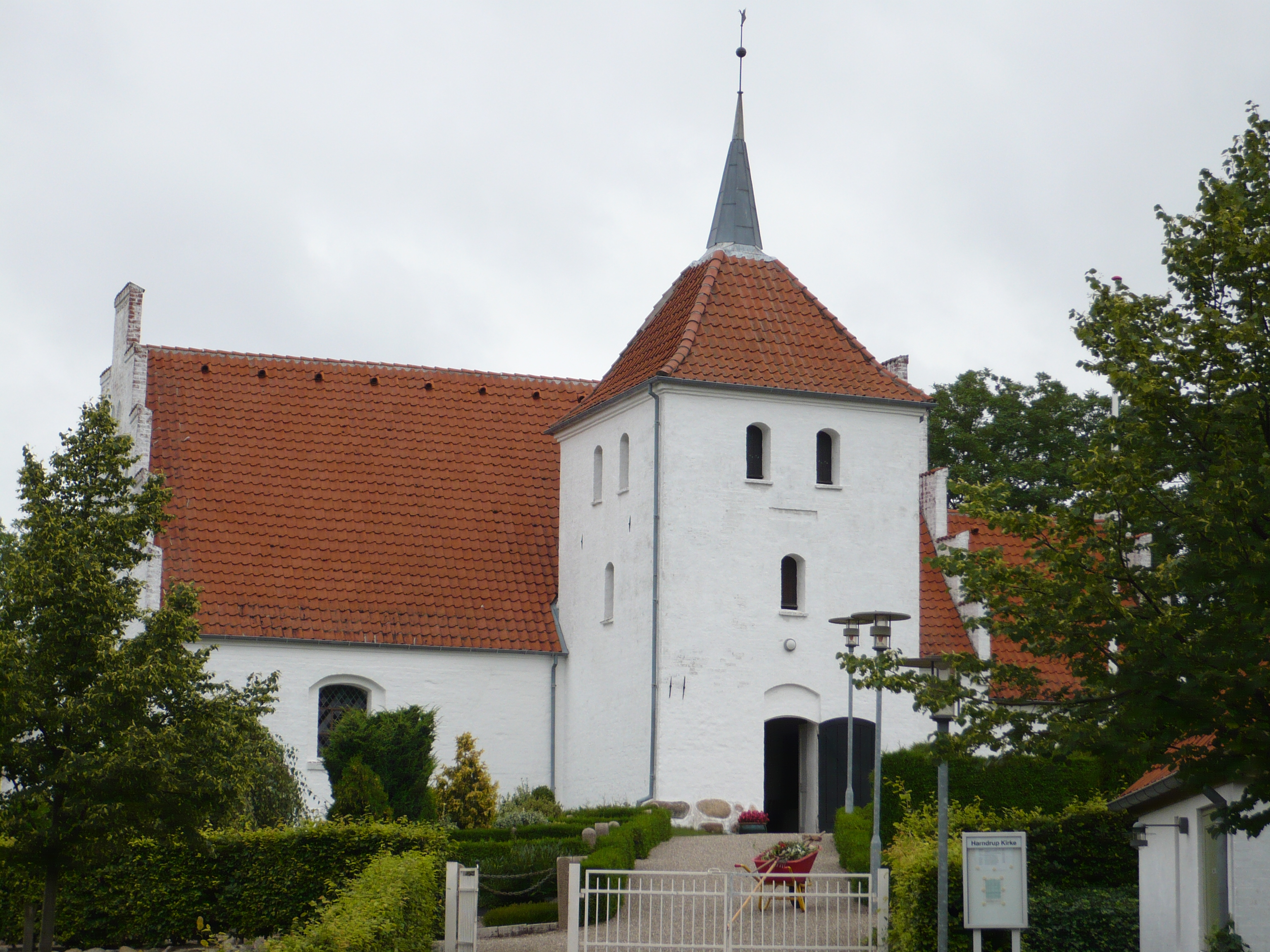
- Harndrup Church

- Location in the Region of Southern Denmark
- Coordinates: 55°27′56″N 10°1′20″E
- Country: Denmark
- Region: Southern Denmark
- Municipality: Middelfart

Population (2026)
  - Total: 611
- Time zone: UTC+1 (CET)
  - Summer (DST): UTC+2 (CEST)
- Postal code: 5463 Harndrup

Harndrup is a village, with a population of 611 (1 January 2026), situated on the island of Funen in Middelfart Municipality, Region of Southern Denmark in Denmark.

Harndrup is located 27 km west of Odense, 21 km east of Middelfart, 8 km northeast of Ejby and 4 km southeast of Brenderup.

Harndrup Church is located in the village.

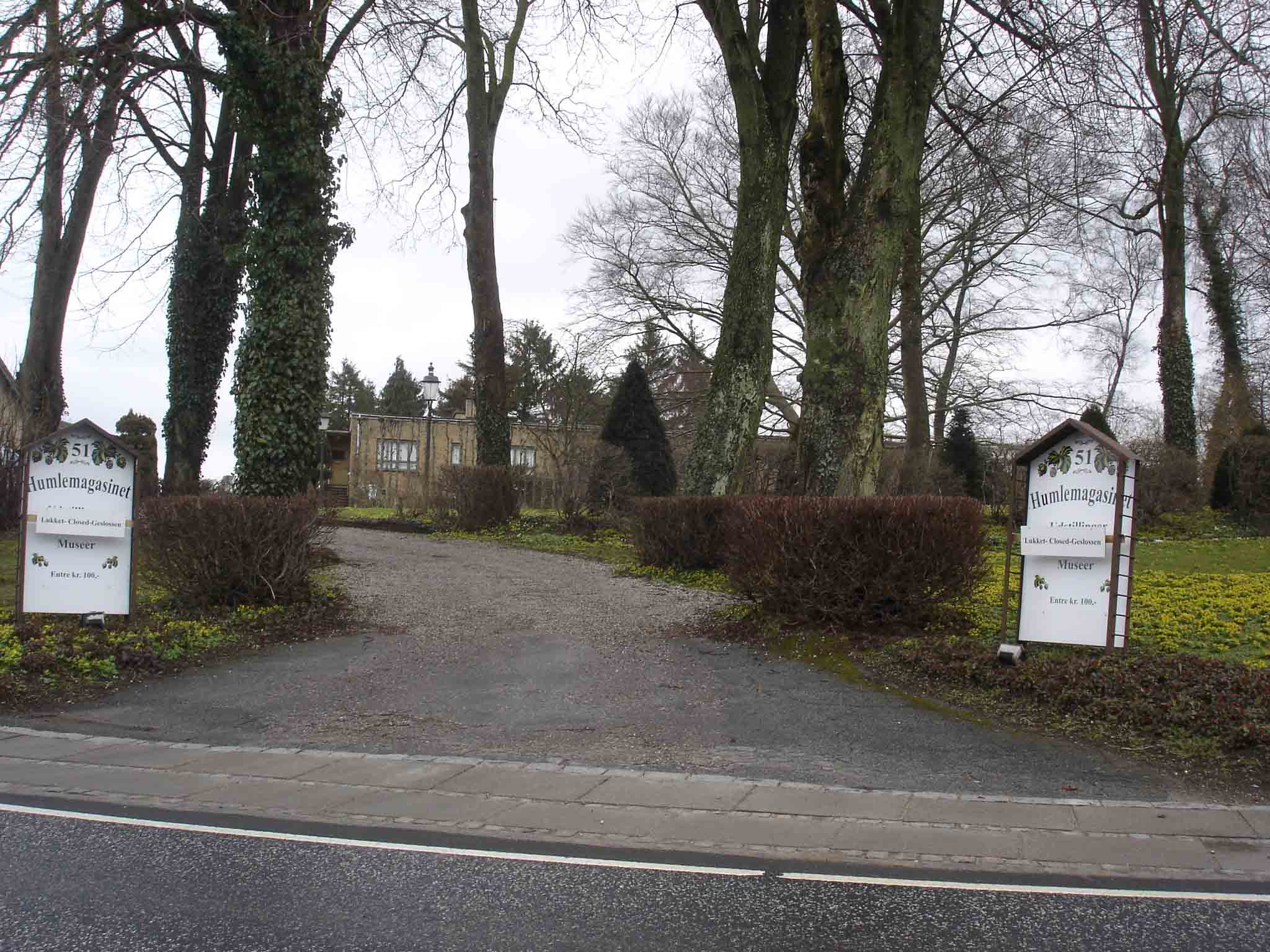
Humlemagasinet

Humlemagasinet is a museum in Harndrup featuring gardens and collections of dolls and beers.

== Sport ==
The village is located 3 kilometers north of Fjelsted, which includes the Speedway stadium known as the Fjelsted Speedway Stadium, which is the home of Fjelsted Speedway Klub who race in the Danish Speedway League.
