= Sławomir Drabik =

Polish speedway rider

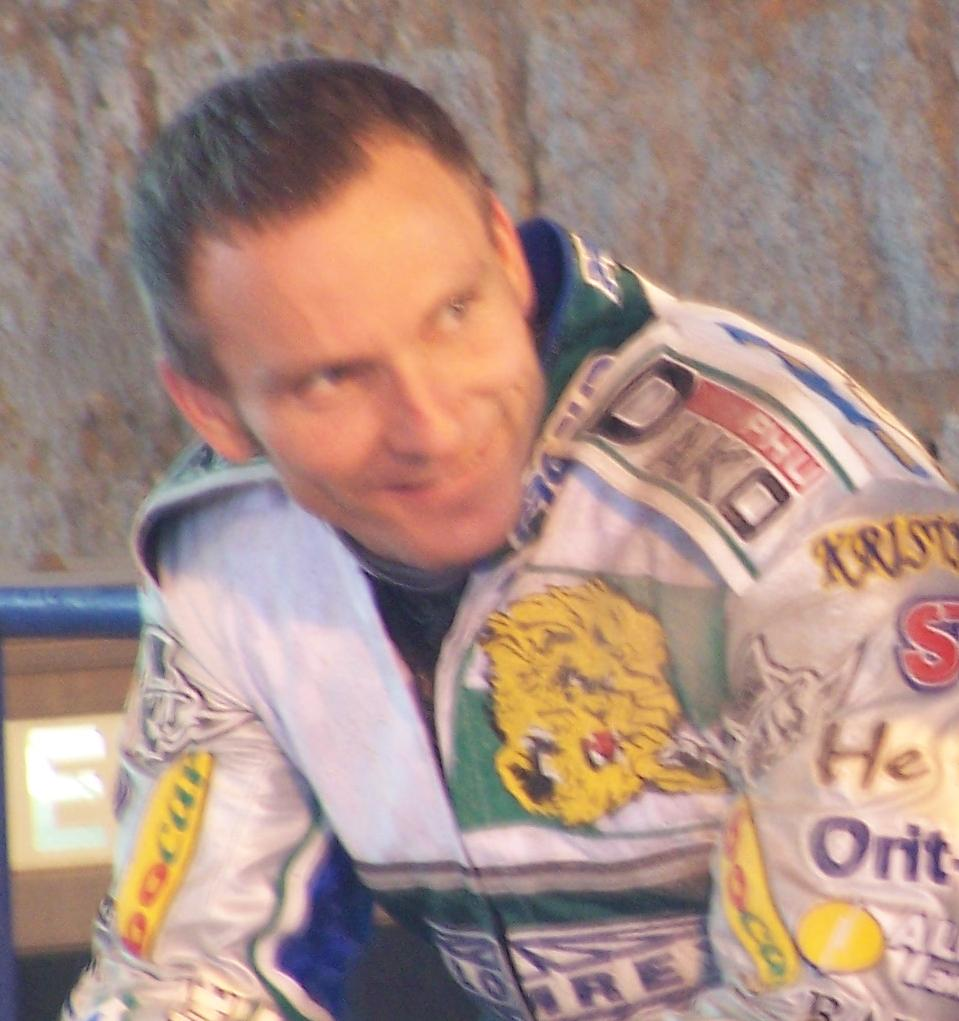
- Born: 6 February 1966 (age 60); Jawor, Poland
- Nationality: Polish

Career history

Poland
- 1984-1985, 1987-2000, 2005-2007, 2009-2010: Włókniarz Częstochowa
- 2001: Polonia Piła
- 2002: Kolejarz Opole
- 2003-2004: WTS Wrocław
- 2008: Unia Tarnów
- 2011: ROW Rybnik

Great Britain
- 1992: Poole Pirates

Denmark
- 2000: Odense

Individual honours
- 2003 - second: European Championship
- 1991, 1996: Polish Champion
- 1991: Golden Helmet Winner

Team honours
- 1996: Team World Champion
- 2007 - second: European Pairs Championship

Sławomir Drabik (born 6 February 1966 in Jawor, Poland, is a former motorcycle speedway rider from Poland, who won the 1996 Speedway World Team Cup. He earned 13 international caps for the Poland speedway team.

== Career ==
Drabik gained his Speedway licence in 1984. In 1987, he toured the United Kingdom with the Polish team and rode in the British leagues after joining Poole Pirates for the 1992 season.

Drabik was second in the 2003 Individual European Championship and 2007 European Pairs Championship. He was a permanent rider of 1997 Speedway Grand Prix.

== World Final Appearances ==
- 1992 - (Poland) Wrocław, Olympic Stadium - 9th - 6pts

== Speedway Grand Prix results ==
1997 Speedway Grand Prix Final Championship standings (Riding No 14)
Race no.	Grand Prix	Pos.	Pts.	Heats	Draw No
1 /6	(Czech Republic) Czech Rep. SGP	4	16	(3,3,2,1,2) +0A	10
2 /6	(Sweden) Swedish SGP	15	2	(2,0,0,0,1) +1D	9
3 /6	(Germany) German SGP	12	6	(0,3,2,0,1) +0C	4
4 /6	(United Kingdom) British SGP	15	2	(1,0,1,0,0) +1D	1
5 /6	(Poland) Polish SGP	8	11	(3,2,1,2,2) +0B	9
6 /6	(Denmark) Danish SGP	16	1	(1,0,0,0,0) +0D	6

permanent speedway rider
wild card, track reserve or qualified reserve
rider not classified (track reserve who did not start)

== Speedway World Team Cup ==
- 1996 - Winner - 27pts (12)

== European Championships ==
Individual European Championship:

- 2003 - 2nd - 12pts + 2pts
- 2005 - 16th - 1pt

European Pairs Championship:

- 2007 - 2nd - 22pts (9)

== Polish Domestic competitions ==
Individual Polish Championship:

- 1991 - Winner
- 1996 - Winner
- 1997 - 2nd
- Polish U-21 Championship:
  - 1986 - 3rd
- Poland Golden Helmet:
  - 1991 - Winner

== Family ==
Drabik's son Maksym is a Polish international speedway rider and double Junior World champion.

== See also ==
- Poland speedway team
- List of Speedway Grand Prix riders
