= Shawn Moran =

American speedway rider

- Born: November 19, 1961 (age 65); Lakewood, California, U.S.
- Nationality: American

Career history

Great Britain
- 1980: Hull Vikings
- 1980-1988, 1994: Sheffield Tigers
- 1989-1993: Belle Vue Aces

Sweden
- 1990-1991: Rospiggarna

Individual honours
- 1982: North American Champion
- 1983: Long Track World Champion
- 1981: European Under-21 Champion
- 1982, 1985: Northern Riders' Champion
- 1984, 1985, 1990: Intercontinental Champion
- 1985: Overseas Champion
- 1989: British League Riders Champion
- 1989: Peter Craven Memorial

Team honours
- 1982, 1990: World Team Cup

Shawn Moran (born November 19, 1961, in Lakewood, California) is an American former professional motorcycle speedway rider who was one of the most popular and talented riders ever to race for Sheffield Tigers. He earned 74 caps for the United States national speedway team.

== Career ==
Moran first rode in British speedway for Hull Vikings in 1979 under the alias 'David East', before riding under his real identity in 1980. He had been subject to a bid to sign him by Cradley Heath before he joined Sheffield from Hull in 1980 for £8,000 and established himself as a fans' favourite who topped the clubs averages every year he was with them.

After finishing 15th at the 1980 European Under-21 Championship, Moran won the 1981 Championship in Slaný, Czechoslovakia, with a 15-point maximum.

In 1982, along with reigning World Champion Bruce Penhall, Bobby Schwartz, Scott Autrey, and his older brother Kelly Moran, Shawn won the Speedway World Team Cup at the White City Stadium in London, England. He would later repeat this success with Team USA in 1990 at the Svítkov Stadion in Pardubice, Czechoslovakia alongside Sam Ermolenko, Rick Miller, Billy Hamill and Kelly Moran.

Moran also helped the US team to second place in both 1985 and 1988 at the Veterans Memorial Stadium in Long Beach (the only times that the World Team Cup Finals were held outside of Great Britain or Europe), while finishing third in 1984 (Leszno, Poland) and 1987 (three rounds held at Fredericia in Denmark, Coventry, England and Prague, Czechoslovakia).

In 1986 Moran was joined by his brother Kelly at Sheffield. Shawn amassed a total of 3,257 points for the Tigers at an average of 9.36. Although regarded as a world-class rider, the individual World Championship eluded him. Moran was first nicknamed 'Shooey' by Bobby "Boogaloo" Schwartz and it stuck throughout his career.

Moran rode in three World Championships in 1984 (Gothenburg) where he finished 8th, 1985 (Bradford) where he finished fifth and 1990 (Bradford). Arguably 1985 was his best season as he won both the Overseas and Intercontinental Finals on his way to the World Final at Bradford. He finished the 1985 World Final at the Odsal Stadium in fifth place with ten-points and two wins from his five rides. In the 1990 World Final at Odsal, he lost a run-off to Sweden's Per Jonsson after both finished on 13 points, one point clear of Australia's Todd Wiltshire.

Moran, though, remains America's only World Longtrack Champion. He won the crown in 1983 while still recovering from a broken leg. He is also a three time winner of the Intercontinental Final, winning in 1984 in Vojens, Denmark, 1985 in Vetlanda, Sweden, and 1990 at Fjelsted Speedway Stadium in Denmark.

In 1989, Moran won the British League Riders' Championship, held at Belle Vue Stadium on 1 October and the Peter Craven Memorial Trophy, also at Belle Vue Stadium.

During his career, Moran was a regular visitor to Australia. He proved to be a popular rider 'Down Under' and enjoyed success on the often larger Australian tracks. In the 1989/90 Australian season, Moran was a resident international rider at the tight North Arm Speedway in Adelaide, and rode for a "Rest of the World" team in a series of test matches against the Australians throughout the season.

In 1984, Moran released a cover version of the 1975 Chris Spedding single, "Motor Bikin'".

== World Final Appearances ==
=== Individual World Championship ===
- 1984 - (Sweden) Gothenburg, Ullevi - 8th - 7pts
- 1985 - (England) Bradford, Odsal Stadium - 5th - 10pts
- 1990 - (England) Bradford, Odsal Stadium - 2nd - 13pts + 2pts*

* 1990 - Disqualified - Failed random drug and alcohol test at 1990 Overseas Final

=== World Pairs Championship ===
- 1984 - (Italy) Lonigo, Santa Marina Stadium (with Bobby Schwartz) – 4th – 19pts (8)
- 1985 - (Poland) Rybnik, Rybnik Municipal Stadium (with Bobby Schwartz) - 3rd - 22pts (11)
- 1988 - (England) Bradford, Odsal Stadium (with Sam Ermolenko) - 3rd - 39pts (23)

=== World Team Cup ===
- 1982 - (England) London, White City Stadium (with Bruce Penhall / Bobby Schwartz / Kelly Moran / Scott Autrey) - Winner - 34pts (8)
- 1984 - (Poland) Leszno, Alfred Smoczyk Stadium (with Kelly Moran / Bobby Schwartz / Lance King / John Cook) – 3rd – 20pts (6)
- 1985 - (United States) Long Beach, Veterans Memorial Stadium (with Bobby Schwartz / John Cook / Lance King / Sam Ermolenko) – 2nd – 35pts (11)
- 1986 - (Sweden) Göteborg, Ullevi, (Denmark) Vojens, Speedway Center, (England) Bradford, Odsal Stadium (with Bobby Schwartz / Sam Ermolenko / Lance King / Rick Miller) - 2nd - 76pts (27)
- 1987 - (Denmark) Fredericia, Fredericia Speedway, (England) Coventry, Brandon Stadium, (Czechoslovakia) Prague, Marketa Stadium (with Sam Ermolenko / Lance King / Rick Miller / Kelly Moran / John Cook) - 3rd - 93pts (23)
- 1988 - (United States) Long Beach, Veterans Memorial Stadium (with Sam Ermolenko / Lance King / Kelly Moran / Rick Miller) - 2nd - 32pts (8)
- 1990 - (Czech Republic) Pardubice, Svítkov Stadion - Winner - 37pts (10)

=== Individual Under-21 World Championship ===
- 1980 - (West Germany) Pocking, Rottalstadion - 15th - 2pts
- 1981 - (Czechoslovakia) Slaný, Slaný Speedway - Winner - 15pts

Between 1977 and 1987 the Under-21 Championship was known as the European Junior Championship.
