= 1997 Speedway Grand Prix =

3rd season of the Speedway Grand Prix

Season details
- Dates: May 17 - September 20
- Events: 6
- Cities: 6
- Countries: 6
- Riders: 17 permanents 1 wild card(s)
- Heats: 144 (in 6 events)

Winners
- Champion: USA Greg Hancock
- Runner-up: USA Billy Hamill
- 3rd place: POL Tomasz Gollob

The 1997 Speedway Grand Prix was the 52nd edition of the official World Championship. It was the third season in the Speedway Grand Prix era used to determine the Speedway World Champion.

Greg Hancock from the United States became the World Champion with 118 points beating fellow American Billy Hamill into second place. The bronze medal went to Pole Tomasz Gollob.

== Event format ==
During 1997 the initial SGP scoring system was used for the final time. Each rider raced every other in the meeting with the top 4 qualifying for a final - the points for all other riders determined their finishing position in the meeting and therefore their championship Grand Prix points. The 4 finalists scored 25, 20, 18 and 16 points, with the remainder scoring 14, 13, 12, 11, 9, 8, 7, 6, 4, 3, 2, 1.

== Qualification for Grand Prix ==
The 1997 season had 17 permanent riders and one wild card at each event. The permanent riders are highlighted in the results table below.

== Calendar ==
Round	Date	City and venue	Winner	Runner-up	3rd placed	4th placed	Results
1	May 17	(Czech Republic) Prague , Czech Republic; Markéta Stadium	(United States) Greg Hancock	(United States) Billy Hamill	(Poland) Tomasz Gollob	(Poland) Slawomir Drabik	results
2	June 14	(Sweden) Linköping , Sweden; Motorstadium	(Poland) Tomasz Gollob	(United States) Greg Hancock	(Sweden) Tony Rickardsson	(Denmark) Hans Nielsen	results
3	July 5	(Germany) Landshut , Germany; Stadion Ellermühle	(Denmark) Hans Nielsen	(Denmark) Brian Andersen	(United States) Greg Hancock	(United States) Billy Hamill	results
4	August 9	(United Kingdom) Bradford , Great Britain; Odsal Stadium	(Denmark) Brian Andersen	(United States) Billy Hamill	(Sweden) Jimmy Nilsen	(United Kingdom) Mark Loram	results
5	August 30	(Poland) Wrocław , Poland; Olympic Stadium	(United States) Greg Hancock	(United States) Billy Hamill	(Poland) Tomasz Gollob	(Poland) Piotr Protasiewicz	results
6	September 20	(Denmark) Vojens , Denmark; Speedway Center	(United Kingdom) Mark Loram	(Sweden) Tony Rickardsson	(United States) Greg Hancock	(Poland) Tomasz Gollob	results

== Final standings ==
Qualifies for next season's Grand Prix series
Full-time Grand Prix rider
Wild card, track reserve or qualified reserve

Pos.	Rider	Points	CZE (Czech Republic)	SWE (Sweden)	GER (Germany)	GBR (United Kingdom)	POL (Poland)	DEN (Denmark)
Gold	(United States) (3) Greg Hancock	118	25	20	18	12	25	18
Silver	(United States) (1) Billy Hamill	101	20	12	16	20	20	13
Bronze	(Poland) (13) Tomasz Gollob	92	18	25	1	14	18	16
4	(Sweden) (4) Tony Rickardsson	90	11	18	14	13	14	20
5	(United Kingdom) (7) Mark Loram	81	7	13	8	16	12	25
6	(Denmark) (12) Brian Andersen	80	9	14	20	25	4	8
7	(Denmark) (2) Hans Nielsen	75	8	16	25	7	7	12
8	(Sweden) (11) Jimmy Nilsen	71	13	7	13	18	9	11
9	(United Kingdom) (8) Chris Louis	59	12	4	12	4	13	14
10	(Australia) (10) Leigh Adams	42	6	6	9	9	3	9
11	(Poland) (14) Sławomir Drabik	38	16	2	6	2	11	1
12	(Sweden) (6) Peter Karlsson	37	4	11	3	6	6	7
13	(Poland) (15) Piotr Protasiewicz	31	1	ns	11	0	16	3
14	(United Kingdom) (18) Andy Smith	22	ns	9	4	3	ns	6
15	(Sweden) (5) Henrik Gustafsson	20	14	3	–	1	2	ns
16	(Sweden) (17) Mikael Karlsson	14	ns	1	ns	11	ns	2
17	(United Kingdom) (9) Simon Wigg	13	3	ns	2	ns	8	ns
18	(Australia) (16) Jason Crump	8	–	8	–	–	–	–
19	(United Kingdom) (16) Joe Screen	8	–	–	–	8	–	–
20	(Germany) (16) Robert Barth	7	–	–	7	–	–	–
21	(Denmark) (16) Jesper B. Jensen	4	–	–	–	–	–	4
22	(Czech Republic) (16) Tomáš Topinka	2	2	–	–	–	–	–
23	(Poland) (16) Rafał Dobrucki	1	–	–	–	–	1	–
Rider(s) not classified
	(United States) (19) Sam Ermolenko	—	–	–	ns	–	–	–
Pos.	Rider	Points	CZE (Czech Republic)	SWE (Sweden)	GER (Germany)	GBR (United Kingdom)	POL (Poland)	DEN (Denmark)

== See also ==
- motorcycle speedway
