= Fjelsted Speedway Stadium =

Motorcycle speedway venue in Harndrup, Denmark

- Location: Fjelsted village, Harndrup, Denmark
- Coordinates: 55.433804°N 10.019944°E
- Major events: Speedway

Oval

Fjelsted Speedway Stadium or Hele Fyns Speedway Center is a motorcycle speedway stadium in Harndrup, Denmark. The stadium is the home track for the Fjelsted Speedway Club.

The municipality identified the village of Fjelsted for the construction of a motorcycling track in 1971 on the location of an old apple orchard. After joining the Danish Motor Union (DMU) in 1973, a larger track was built three years later in 1976.

The stadium held the Danish final of the Speedway World Championship in 1978 and the 1990 Intercontinental final was held at the track.

In 2017, the Danish Individual Speedway Championship was held at the stadium for the ninth time in its history.
