= Tomáš Topinka =

Czech speedway rider (born 1974)

- Born: 5 June 1974 (age 52); Prague, Czechoslovakia
- Nationality: Czech

Career history

Czechoslovakia
- 1991: Olymp Praha

Great Britain
- 1993–1995, 1997–1999, 2005–2011: King's Lynn Stars
- 1996: Oxford Cheetahs
- 1999: Ipswich Witches
- 2001: Belle Vue Aces
- 2002, 2005: Coventry Bees
- 1999: Workington Comets

Poland
- 1995–1996: WTS Wrocław
- 1998: KS Toruń
- 1999: RKM Rybnik
- 2000: GTŻ Grudziądz
- 2003: Kolejarz Rawicz

Sweden
- 1997–2003: Bysarna
- 2000: Indianerna

Team honours
- 1996: Premier League Four-Team Championship
- 2000: Allsvenskan Winner

Tomáš Topinka (born 5 June 1974) is a former motorcycle speedway rider from the Czech Republic. He earned 16 international caps for the Czech Republic national speedway team.

== Career ==
Topinka participated in Speedway World Cups for Czech Republic team. He rode in the British leagues from 1993 to 2011 and was a King's Lynn Stars regular for 15 years.

1996 Winner of the Pardubice Golden Helmet

In 1996, Topinka was part of the Oxford Cheetahs four that won the Premier League Four-Team Championship, which was held on 4 August 1996, at the East of England Arena.

== Speedway Grand Prix results ==
1997 SGP
	Grand Prix	Pos.	Pts.	Heats	Draw
1 (1)	(Czech Republic) Prague	15	2	(0,1,T,0,1) +1D	13

2003 SGP
	Grand Prix	Pos.	Pts.	Heats	Draw
1 (2)	(Czech Republic) Prague	6	13	(0,3,2) (0,3,2) + 1	10

permanent speedway rider
wild card, track reserve or qualified reserve
rider not classified (track reserve who did not start)

== Results ==
=== World Championships ===
- Individual World Championship (Speedway Grand Prix)
  - 1994 - 10th place in World Semi-Final 2
  - 1997 - 22nd place (2 points in one event)
  - 2003 - 26th place (13 points in one event)
- Team World Championship (Speedway World Team Cup and Speedway World Cup)
  - 1997 - (Poland) Piła - 5th place (10 pts)
  - 2002 - (United Kingdom) Peterborough - 5th place (3 pts)
  - 2003 - (Denmark) - 6th place
  - 2004 - (United Kingdom) - 6th place
  - 2005 - 6th place
- Individual U-21 World Championship
  - 1993 - (Czech Republic) Pardubice - 8th place (7 pts)
  - 1994 - (Norway) Elgane - 4th place (12 pts +2)
  - 1995 - (Finland) Tampere - 4th place (12 pts +2)

== See also ==
- Czech Republic national speedway team
- List of Speedway Grand Prix riders
