= Brian Andersen =

Danish speedway rider

- Born: 13 March 1971 (age 55); Sønderborg, Denmark
- Nationality: Danish

Career history

Denmark
- 1990–1995: Fredericia
- 2000–2001: Herning
- 2002: Kronjylland

Great Britain
- 1992-1999: Coventry Bees
- 2000-2002: Oxford Cheetahs

Poland
- 1991: Poznań
- 1995, 1997: Rzeszów
- 1998-1999: Leszno
- 2000: Wrocław
- 2001: Częstochowa

Sweden
- 1998-2000: Masarna
- 2000: Filbyterna
- 2001: Kaparna
- 2002: Vargarna

Individual honours
- 1995, 1999: Danish Champion
- 1997: Grand Prix wins
- 1991: U-21 World Champion

Team honours
- 1996, 1998: World Cup bronze
- 2000: Elitserien Champion
- 1998: Allsvenskan Div 1 Champion

Brian Askel Andersen (born 13 March 1971) is a Danish former international motorcycle speedway rider. He earned 12 caps for the Denmark national speedway team.

== Career ==
Andersen reached the final of the Under-21 World Championship in 1990. The following year, he won the championship to become the 1991 Junior World Champion. In the final, he defeatied fellow Dane Morten Andersen in a run-off for the title after both riders had finished on 14 points. The success brought him to the attention of British leagues and Coventry Bees signed him for the 1992 British League season.

Andersen drove up his average over the following seasons for Coventry and established himself as one of their leading riders. In 1995, he won the Individual Speedway Danish Championship. In 1996, he finished second in the 1996 Intercontinental Final, which qualified him for his first Speedway Grand Prix series. He later became the captain of Coventry.

Andersen rode in the Grand Prix between 1997 and 2001, and won two bronze medals in the Speedway World Team Cup. He won the Danish Championship for the second time in 1999, which was also his last season for Coventry before he moved to join Oxford Cheetahs for the 2000 Elite League speedway season.

In 2001, Andersen was part of the Oxford Cheetahs title winning team in 2001.

== Family ==
Andersen's brother Jan was a speedway rider. His son Mikkel is also a speedway rider and the 2022 FIM Speedway Youth World Championship (SGP3) world champion.

== Major results ==
=== World individual Championship ===
- 1997 Speedway Grand Prix - 6th (80 pts) including winning the 1997 Speedway Grand Prix of Great Britain
- 1998 Speedway Grand Prix - 16th (31 pts)
- 1999 Speedway Grand Prix - 22nd (12 pts)
- 2000 Speedway Grand Prix - 23rd (15 pts)
- 2001 Speedway Grand Prix - 18th (23 pts)

=== World team Championships ===
- 1996 Speedway World Team Cup - bronze medal
- 1998 Speedway World Team Cup - bronze medal
- 2000 Speedway World Team Cup - =5th
- 2001 Speedway World Cup - 4th

== See also ==
- Denmark national speedway team
- List of Speedway Grand Prix riders
