= 1995 Premier League speedway season =

British motorcycle speedway season

- League: Premier League
- Champions: Eastbourne Eagles
- Knockout Cup: Bradford Dukes
- Individual: Gary Havelock
- Fours: Cradley Heathens
- Highest average: Billy Hamill
- Division/s below: 1995 Academy League

The 1995 Premier League season was the 61st season of the top tier of speedway in the United Kingdom. It was also the first for the new league, and the first of two seasons in which British speedway was competed as a single division.

== Summary ==
The gulf in quality of teams was highlighted because of the merging of the two leagues, with Eastbourne Eagles winning the title 56 points clear of bottom club Exeter Falcons. Eastbourne had been an easy runner-up the previous year to runaway winners Poole Pirates and retained four of their riders Martin Dugard, Dean Barker, Stefan Dannö and Stefan Andersson, which provided enough firepower to seal the Championship. Poole finished mid-table but were missing Craig Boyce who had switched to Swindon Robins.

Bradford Dukes won their fourth Knockout Cup in the last five years. Former World Champion Gary Havelock guided Bradford to the Cup success and also picked up the Premier League Riders Championship.

== Final table ==
Pos	Team	PL	W	D	L	BP	Pts
1	Eastbourne Eagles	40	28	3	9	18	77
2	Bradford Dukes	40	25	2	13	17	69
3	Cradley Heath Heathens	40	25	1	14	17	68
4	Peterborough Panthers	40	25	0	15	12	62
5	Wolverhampton Wolves	40	23	0	17	14	60
6	Ipswich Witches	40	23	0	17	13	59
7	Glasgow Tigers	40	21	1	18	14	57
8	Belle Vue Aces	40	20	1	19	14	55
9	Edinburgh Monarchs	40	20	4	16	10	54
10	Arena Essex Hammers	40	21	0	19	10	52
11	Swindon Robins	40	20	3	17	9	52
12	Poole Pirates	40	18	2	20	9	47
13	Reading Racers	40	17	4	19	9	47
14	Sheffield Tigers	40	19	0	21	9	47
15	Coventry Bees	40	17	1	22	8	43
16	Hull Vikings	40	17	2	21	4	40
17	Oxford Cheetahs	40	16	1	23	6	39
18	Long Eaton Invaders	40	14	4	22	7	39
19	King's Lynn Stars	40	14	4	22	6	38
20	Middlesbrough Bears	40	10	2	28	2	24
21	Exeter Falcons	40	8	3	29	2	21

M = Matches; W = Wins; D = Draws; L = Losses; Pts = Total Points

=== Fixtures & results ===
Home \ Away	AE	BV	BD	COV	CH	EAS	ED	EX	GLA	HV	IPS	KL	LON	MID	OX	PET	PP	RR	SHE	SWI	WOL
Arena Essex Hammers		60–36	53–42	49–47	49–47	45–51	61–35	66–30	55–41	63–33	49–47	53–43	55–41	55–41	54–42	57–39	51–45	61–35	56–40	54–42	45–51
Belle Vue Aces	57–39		57–38	56–40	46–50	48–48	62–34	59–37	55–41	64–32	58–38	57–39	54–42	57–39	53–43	59–37	58–37	55–41	55–40	59–36	54–42
Bradford Dukes	58–38	64–32		49–47	47–49	53–43	61–35	58–38	54–42	58–38	56–40	66–30	59–36	69–26	59–37	54–41	58–38	59–37	63–33	55–41	57–39
Coventry Bees	54–42	50–46	45–51		52–44	50–46	48–48	59–37	50–45	49–47	49–47	53–43	51–44	59–37	47–49	52–44	46–50	62–33	54–41	43–53	55–41
Cradley Heath Heathens	50–46	55–41	53–43	51–45		56–39	53–43	60–36	59–37	61–34	47–49	58–37	55–41	63–33	62–34	56–40	55–41	55–41	62–34	47–49	55–41
Eastbourne Eagles	59–36	49–46	55–41	53–43	50–43		54–42	59–37	64–32	60–36	50–46	51–45	54–40	55–40	53–43	59–36	52–44	58–38	63–33	60–36	51–45
Edinburgh Monarchs	50–46	53–43	48–48	49–46	50–46	46–49		63–33	62–34	56–40	51–45	50–46	48–48	52–44	49–47	51–45	56–40	51–45	67–29	54–42	50–46
Exeter Falcons	53–43	57–39	41–55	45–51	39–56	51–45	37–59		55–41	52–44	43–53	48–48	48–48	56–40	52–44	40–55	45–51	48–48	46–50	46–50	50–46
Glasgow Tigers	57–39	51–45	53.5–42.5	51–45	50–46	54–41	49–47	68–28		49–47	60–36	63–33	62–34	60–36	56–40	55–41	64–32	59–37	55–40	56–40	52–44
Hull Vikings	46–50	46–50	54–42	51–45	48–48	49–47	49–47	51–45	48–48		51–45	53–43	55–41	51–43	50–46	54–42	53–43	56–40	57–39	55–41	51–45
Ipswich Witches	54–42	44–52	54–42	49–47	48–47	60–36	52–44	60–36	49–47	68–28		53–43	57–39	57–38	63–33	51–45	50–45	62–33	59–37	46–50	52–44
King's Lynn Stars	46–50	51–45	52–44	46–50	47–49	48–48	61–35	54–42	62–33	54–42	49–47		54–42	57–39	49–45	45–51	46–49	46–50	58–38	48–48	57–38
Long Eaton Invaders	50–46	58–38	46–49	55–40	47–49	55–41	53–43	56–40	55–41	37–59	52–44	42–54		63–33	48–48	44–52	52–44	56–40	59–37	40–56	45–51
Middlesbrough Bears	46–0	52–44	42–54	53–43	49–47	45–51	42–44	55–41	45–50	58–38	42–54	54–42	48–48		57–39	52–43	47–48	53–43	55–41	48–48	44–52
Oxford Cheetahs	53–43	50–46	54–42	51–45	50–45	42–53	47–49	61–35	52–43	54–42	45–51	53–43	56–40	57–39		45–51	45–50	54–42	62–34	56–40	51–45
Peterborough Panthers	51–45	52–43	57–39	50–46	52–44	53–43	65.5–30.5	63–33	50–46	58–37	52–43	55–41	62–34	58–38	59–37		56–39	52–44	54–42	54–42	53–43
Poole Pirates	57–39	58–38	42–54	49–47	44–51	48–48	55–41	51–45	56–40	61–35	55–41	56–39	47–49	64–32	57–39	43–53		47–49	59–36	47–49	51–45
Reading Racers	53–43	51–45	48–48	52–44	50–45	46–50	49–47	53–42	55–41	59–37	39–57	48–48	52–44	55–41	54–42	66–30	48–48		61–35	56–40	47–49
Sheffield Tigers	67–29	59–37	49–47	56–40	49–47	44–52	63–33	53–43	55–41	49–47	59–37	61–35	64–32	73–23	62–34	50–46	49–47	51–44		47–49	55–41
Swindon Robins	56–40	49–46	45–51	53–43	53–43	47–48	48–48	53–43	50–46	53–43	51–45	46–50	43–51	63–33	53–43	53–43	51–45	45–51	58–38		44–51
Wolverhampton Wolves	58–38	39–33	53–43	49–47	47–49	43–53	52–44	64–32	52–44	61–35	49–47	61–35	55–41	50–46	61–35	53–42	59–37	53–43	70–26	53–42	

Legend: Blue = home team win; Yellow = draw; Red = away team win.

== Premier League Knockout Cup ==
The 1995 Speedway Star Knockout Cup was the 57th edition of the Knockout Cup for tier one teams but the first to be known as the Premier League Knockout Cup. Bradford Dukes were the winners of the competition.

First round

Date	Team one	Score	Team two
21/04	Peterborough	64-42	Ipswich
20/04	Ipswich	65-44	Peterborough
22/04	Eastbourne	52-54	Arena Essex
21/04	Arena Essex	56-53	Eastbourne
23/04	Glasgow	63-43	Middlesbrough
27/04	Middlesbrough	43-64	Glasgow
18/05	Sheffield	63-43	Long Eaton
19/04	Long Eaton	54-52	Sheffield
21/04	Oxford	72-36	Poole
19/04	Poole	54-51	Oxford

Second round

Date	Team one	Score	Team two
20/07	Ipswich	52-56	Reading
17/07	Reading	46-59	Ipswich
15/07	Bradford	70-38	Wolverhampton
05/07	Kings Lynn	55-53	Coventry
17/06	Coventry	65-43	Kings Lynn
14/06	Cradley Heath	59-53	Glasgow
09/06	Edinburgh	46-61	Hull
05/06	Exeter	47-57	Swindon
05/06	Wolverhampton	58-46	Bradford
04/06	Glasgow	54-53	Cradley Heath
03/06	Swindon	55-50	Exeter
31/05	Hull	59-49	Edinburgh
02/06	Belle Vue	68-36	Sheffield
01/06	Sheffield	61-46	Belle Vue
02/06	Arena Essex	58-48	Oxford
29/05	Oxford	58.5-47.5	Arena Essex

Quarter-finals

Date	Team one	Score	Team two
10/08	Ipswich	57-50	Coventry
05/08	Bradford	72-35	Hull
26/07	Coventry	58-49	Ipswich
26/07	Hull	54-41	Bradford
22/07	Cradley Heath	61-47	Oxford
22/07	Swindon	57-50	Belle Vue
21/07	Belle Vue	68-38	Swindon
21/07	Oxford	54-52	Cradley Heath

Semi-finals

Date	Team one	Score	Team two
13/09	Coventry	52-55	Bradford
02/09	Bradford	58-50	Coventry
19/08	Cradley Heath	49-57	Belle Vue
18/08	Belle Vue	59-48	Cradley Heath

=== Final ===
First leg

16 September 1995

Bradford Dukes Sean Wilson 17 Gary Havelock 14+1 Paul Pickering 11+2 Darren Pearson 10+3 Joe Screen 6 Tony Atkin 3+1 Garry Stead R/R	68 - 39	Belle Vue Aces Jason Lyons 9 Chris Manchester 8 Niklas Klingberg 6 Kevin Little 5+1 Frede Schött 3 Max Schofield 3+3 John Jørgensen 1

Odsal Stadium

Second leg

22 September 1995

Belle Vue Aces Niklas Klingberg 14 Jason Lyons 13 Chris Manchester 12 Frede Schött Kevin Little 5	58 - 43	Bradford Dukes Martin Dugard16 Gary Havelock 10 Sean Wilson Paul Pickering Darren Pearson

Belle Vue Stadium

Bradford Dukes were declared Knockout Cup Champions, winning on aggregate 111-97.

== Riders' Championship ==
Gary Havelock won the Premier League Riders Championship. It was held at Abbey Stadium, Swindon on 14 October.

Pos.	Rider	Heat Scores	Total	SF	Final
1	(England) Gary Havelock	3 2 3 2	10	x	3
2	(United States) Billy Hamill	0 3 3 3	9	3	2
3	(Australia) Jason Crump	3 3 3 2	11	x	1
4	(Australia) Leigh Adams	3 3 3 2	11	x	0
5	(United States) Greg Hancock	2 2 2 3	9	2	x
6	(Sweden) Peter Karlsson	1 3 2 3	9	1	x
7	(United States) Sam Ermolenko	3 2 2 0	7		
8	(Australia) Craig Boyce	3 1 1 2	7		
9	(England) Paul Fry	1 1 2 3	7		
10	(Australia) Shane Parker	2 1 1 3	7		
11	(Denmark) Brian Andersen	2 2 2 1	7		
12	(England) Chris Louis	2 0 3 1	6		
13	(Norway) Lars Gunnestad	1 3 1 1	6		
14	(Sweden) Jimmy Nilsen	2 2 1 1	6		
15	(United States) Mike Faria	3 2 0 0	5		
16	(Australia) Steve Johnston	2 3 0 0	5		
17	(Australia) Ryan Sullivan	1 0 3 1	5		
18	(England) Paul Thorp	0 1 1 3	5		
19	(Sweden) Stefan Andersson	1 0 2 2	5		
20	(United States) Charles Ermolenko	0 0 1 2	3		
21	(Denmark) Frede Schott	0 1 0 1	2		
22	(England) Dave Mullett	1 0 0 0	1		
23	(United States) Bobby Ott	0 1 0 0	1		
24	(Australia) Greg Bartlett	0 0 0 0	0		

== Fours ==
Cradley Heathens won the Premier League Four-Team Championship, which was held on 6 August 1995, at the East of England Arena.

Group A
Pos	Team	Pts	Riders
1	Cradley	16	Cross 6, Hancock 5, Hamill 3, Smith 1, Forsgren 1
2	Arena Essex	13	Hurry 5, Larsen 5, Mogridge 2, Adams 1
3	Edinburgh	11	Andersen 3, McKinna 3, Lamb 3, Faria 2
4	King's Lynn	7	Ott 4, Brhel 2, Topinla 1, Grayling 0

Group B
Pos	Team	Pts	Riders
1	Peterborough	18	Sullivan 6, Pedersen 5, Tesar 5, Poole 2, Clausen 0
2	Bradford	14	Screen 6, Havelock 5, Wilson 2, Stead 1
3	Wolverhampton	9	Ermolenko 4, Carter 2, Karlsson 1, White 1, Juul 1
4	Hull	7	Steachmann 5, Thorp 1, Smith 1, Crabtree 0, Grahame 0

Final
Pos	Team	Pts	Riders
1	Cradley	21	Cross 8, Hamill 8, Hancock 3, Smith 2
2	Peterborough	20	Poole 7, Sullivan 7, Tesar 6, Pedersen 0, Clausen 0
3	Bradford	19	Screen 6, Havelock 5, Wilson 5, Pickering 3
4	Arena Essex	11	Hurry 5, Adams 4, Larsen 2, Mogridge 0

== Leading final averages ==
Rider	Team	Average
(United States) Billy Hamill	Cradley Heath	10.91
(England) Joe Screen	Bradford	10.82
(England) Chris Louis	Ipswich	10.52
(Sweden) Peter Karlsson	Wolverhampton	10.50
(Australia) Jason Crump	Poole	10.44
(United States) Greg Hancock	Cradley Heath	10.42
(United States) Sam Ermolenko	Wolverhampton	10.37
(England) Gary Havelock	Bradford	10.25
(England) Martin Dugard	Eastbourne	10.22
(Australia) Craig Boyce	Swindon	9.99
(Australia) Leigh Adams	Arena Essex	9.96
(Norway) Lars Gunnestad	Poole	9.94
(England) Mark Loram	Exeter	9.78
(Denmark) Brian Andersen	Coventry	9.53
(England) Dean Barker	Eastbourne	9.35
(Australia) Jason Lyons	Belle Vue	9.06
(United States) Bobby Ott	Kings Lynn	8.98
(England) Paul Thorp	Hull	8.97
(England) David Norris	Reading	8.90
(Australia) Ryan Sullivan	Peterborough	8.85

== Riders & final averages ==
Arena Essex

- (Australia) Leigh Adams 9.96
- (United States) Josh Larsen 8.09
- (England) Paul Hurry 7.45
- (Denmark) Jan Pedersen 6.20
- (Sweden) Christer Rohlén 6.08
- (England) Alan Mogridge 5.82
- (Sweden) Mikael Teurnberg 5.11
- (England) Robert Ledwith 4.68
- (England) Paul Whittaker 2.69

Belle Vue

- (Australia) Jason Lyons 9.06
- (United States) Chris Manchester 8.35
- (Denmark) Frede Schött 7.86
- (Sweden) Niklas Klingberg 7.75
- (England) Peter Carr 5.92
- (England) Louis Carr 4.71
- (England) Max Schofield 4.69
- (Denmark) John Jørgensen 2.74
- (Scotland) Kevin Little 3.50
- (England) Neil Evitts 3.20

Bradford

- (England) Joe Screen 10.82
- (England) Gary Havelock 10.25
- (England) Sean Wilson 8.12
- (England) Garry Stead 6.86
- (England) Paul Pickering 5.40
- (England) Tony Atkin 3.90
- (England) Darren Pearson 3.76
- (England) Simon Green 3.33

Coventry

- (Denmark) Brian Andersen 9.53
- (Denmark) John Jørgensen 8.56
- (England) Andy Smith 6.68
- (England) Paul Bentley 6.51
- (England) Shaun Tacey 5.49
- (England) Stuart Robson 5.31
- (England) Darren Spicer 4.05

Cradley Heath

- (United States) Billy Hamill 10.91
- (United States) Greg Hancock 10.42
- (England) Simon Cross 9.01
- (Sweden) Jonathan Forsgren 5.44
- (England) Scott Smith 5.17
- (England) Steve Knott 4.08
- (England) John Wilson 2.01
- (England) David Clarke 1.24

Eastbourne

- (England) Martin Dugard 10.22
- (England) Dean Barker 9.35
- (Sweden) Stefan Dannö 8.71
- (Sweden) Stefan Andersson 7.80
- (England) Darren Shand 4.68
- (Sweden) Stefan Ekberg 4.42
- (England) Scott Swain 3.75

Edinburgh

- (United States) Mike Faria 8.26
- (England) Les Collins 6.87
- (Scotland) Scott Lamb 6.78
- (Denmark) Jan Andersen 6.75
- (Sweden) Robert Eriksson 6.69
- (Scotland) Kenny McKinna 6.40
- (England) Lawrence Hare 5.59
- (Denmark) Robert Larsen 3.54

Exeter

- (England) Mark Loram 9.78
- (England) Paul Fry 6.56
- (Czech Republic) Petr Vandírek 6.00
- (England) Mark Simmonds 5.62
- (Czech Republic) Antonín Šváb Jr. 5.42
- (Czech Republic) Bořivoj Hádek 4.67
- (England) Scott Pegler 4.04
- (England) Graeme Gordon 2.13

Glasgow

- (England) David Walsh 8.53
- (United States) Charles Ermolenko 8.48
- (Australia) Shane Bowes 7.11
- (Denmark) Jesper Olsen 6.34
- (Scotland) James Grieves 6.26
- (England) Sean Courtney 5.60
- (Australia) Mick Powell 5.43

Hull

- (England) Paul Thorp 8.97
- (Denmark) Jan Stæchmann 8.20
- (England) Alan Grahame 7.15
- (England) Nigel Crabtree 7.04
- (England) Graham Jones 4.68
- (England) Paul Smith 4.35
- (England) Andre Compton 3.59
- (England) Anthony Barlow 1.00
- (England) Lee Dicken 0.71

Ipswich

- (England) Chris Louis 10.52
- (England) Jeremy Doncaster 8.26
- (England) Ben Howe 7.34
- (England) Scott Nicholls 6.01
- (England) Leigh Lanham 5.99
- (England) Savalas Clouting 5.75
- (England) Emmerson Fairweather 4.22

King's Lynn

- (United States) Bobby Ott 8.98
- (Czech Republic) Tomáš Topinka 8.75
- (Denmark) Morten Andersen 8.18
- (Czech Republic) Bohumil Brhel 6.92
- (England) Troy Pratt 5.43
- (England) Darren Grayling 3.82
- (England) Jason Gage 3.50
- (England) David Clarke 3.16
- (England) Chris Readshaw 2.15

Long Eaton

- Jan Stæchmann 10.10
- (United States) Ronnie Correy 8.84
- (Australia) Steve Johnston 7.61
- (England) Carl Stonehewer 7.22
- (England) Martin Dixon 6.81
- (Sweden) Richard Hellsen 5.45
- (United States) Brent Werner 5.13
- (England) Eric Monaghan 4.58
- (Germany) Andre Pollehn 4.00
- (England) Mark Burrows 3.06

Middlesbrough

- (Australia) Shane Parker 8.54
- (Hungary) Róbert Nagy 6.55
- (England) Scott Robson 6.18
- (Denmark) Martin Vinther 5.94
- (England) Mike Smith 5.67
- (England) Stuart Swales 4.69
- (Scotland) Stewart McDonald 3.73
- (Slovenia) Martin Peterca 2.26

Oxford

- (Sweden) Jimmy Nilsen 8.36
- (Italy) Armando Castagna 7.72
- (Sweden) Daniel Andersson 7.55
- (England) Michael Coles 5.93
- (England) Martin Goodwin 5.79
- (Denmark) Rene Madsen 4.81
- (Zimbabwe) Davd Steen 4.81

Peterborough

- (Australia) Ryan Sullivan 8.85
- (Czech Republic) Zdeněk Tesař 8.38
- (Australia) Mick Poole 8.15
- (Denmark) Ronni Pedersen 6.53
- (Denmark) Hans Clausen 6.12
- (Denmark) Jens Rasmussen 5.11
- (Czech Republic) Marián Jirout 4.97

Poole

- (Australia) Jason Crump 10.44
- (Norway) Lars Gunnestad 9.94
- (England) Steve Schofield 8.26
- (England) Alun Rossiter 6.83
- (England) Steve Masters 3.83
- (England) Martin Willis 3.35
- (England) Justin Elkins 3.01
- (New Zealand) Jason Bunyan 2.06

Reading

- (England) Marvyn Cox 9.44
- (England) David Norris 8.90
- (England) Dave Mullett 8.31
- (Sweden) Tony Olsson 7.74
- (England) Ray Morton 7.01
- (Finland) Petri Kokko 5.97
- (England) Phil Morris 5.02
- (England) Jason Gage 3.00
- (England) Lee Richardson 1.29

Sheffield

- (Australia) Greg Bartlett 7.31
- (Hungary) Zoltán Adorján 7.23
- (Czech Republic) Roman Matoušek 6.91
- (Czech Republic) George Štancl 6.84
- (England) Neil Collins 6.82
- (Estonia) Rene Aas 5.91
- (England) Will Beveridge 2.93
- (England) Mike Hampson 2.50

Swindon

- (Denmark) Brian Karger 8.66
- (New Zealand) Mark Thorpe 8.36
- (Sweden) Peter Nahlin 7.92
- (England) Gary Chessell 6.12
- (England) Glenn Cunningham 5.59
- (Sweden) Patrik Olsson 4.49
- (England) Martin Willis 2.63
- (England) John Jefferies 1.38

Wolverhampton

- (Sweden) Peter Karlsson 10.50
- (United States) Sam Ermolenko 10.37
- (Denmark) Richard Juul 5.94
- (Denmark) Jacob Olsen 5.61
- (England) Wayne Carter 5.10
- (England) Colin White 4.99
- (England) Stephen Morris 4.00
- (England) Craig Taylor 2.71
- (England) David Clarke 2.09

== See also ==
- List of United Kingdom Speedway League Champions
- Knockout Cup (speedway)
