= 1992 Overseas final =

1992 Overseas Final

Seasons
- ← 1991 1993 →

The 1992 Overseas Final was the twelfth running of the Overseas Final as part of the qualification for the 1992 Speedway World Championship Final to be held in Wrocław, Poland. The 1992 Final was held at the Brandon Stadium in Coventry, England on 14 June and was the second last qualifying round for Commonwealth and American riders.

The Top 9 riders from the Overseas Final qualified for the World Semi-final's. England's Gary Havelock won the meeting and later in Poland became the first Overseas Final winner to go on and win the World Championship. Havelock also became the first English rider since Michael Lee in 1980 to win speedway's ultimate individual prize.

== 1992 Overseas Final ==
- 14 June
- (United Kingdom) Coventry, Brandon Stadium
- Qualification: Top 9 plus 1 reserve to the World Semi-final

Pos.	Rider	Total
1	(United Kingdom) Gary Havelock	13
2	(New Zealand) Mitch Shirra	12
3	(United Kingdom) Kelvin Tatum	11
4	(United States) Sam Ermolenko	10
5	(United Kingdom) Andy Smith	10
6	(United Kingdom) Martin Dugard	9
7	(Australia) Jason Lyons	9
8	(United States) Rick Miller	8
9	(United States) Ronnie Correy	8
10	(United Kingdom) Marvyn Cox	7+3
11	(Australia) Shane Parker	7+2
12	(United States) Mike Faria	5
13	(United States) Billy Hamill	4
14	(United Kingdom) Paul Thorp	3
15	(New Zealand) Mark Thorpe	3
16	(United Kingdom) Simon Wigg	1
17	(United States) Bobby Ott (Res)	0

== See also ==
- Motorcycle Speedway
