= 1993 British League season =

59th season of British motorcycle speedway

- League: British League
- No. of competitors: 11
- Champions: Belle Vue Aces
- Knockout Cup: Bradford Dukes
- Fours: Reading Racers
- Individual: Per Jonsson
- Highest average: Sam Ermolenko
- Division/s below: British League (Div 2)

The 1993 British League season was the 59th season of the top tier of speedway in the United Kingdom and the 29th known as the British League.

== Summary ==
Oxford Cheetahs dropped out of the first division resulting in their three time World Champion Hans Nielsen moving to Coventry Bees and Martin Dugard joining Eastbourne Eagles. Swindon Robins also dropped down to division 2 with their leading rider Leigh Adams going to the Arena Essex. Swindon's other leading riders also moved with Jimmy Nilsen switching to Bradford, Mitch Shirra to Ipswich and Kelly Moran retired.

Belle Vue Aces won their first title since 1982. The Manchester team relied on a group of consistent riders, with no rider exceeding a 9-point average but five riders ranging from 8.75 to 6.72. The team consisted of World Under-21 champion Joe Screen, Australian Jason Lyons, Americans Bobby Ott and Shawn Moran and Dane Frede Schött. The Championship was the closest in British League history with Belle Vue finishing on the same points as Wolverhampton Wolves and taking the title on heat points difference. It all came down to the last match when Belle Vue visited Wolves and pulled off a 54–53 victory. Wolves who were clear at the top of the table earlier in the season suffered a series of injuries and were missing four riders towards the end of the season.

== Final table ==
Pos	Team	PL	W	D	L	BP	Pts
1	Belle Vue Aces	40	24	1	15	14	63
2	Wolverhampton Wolves	40	23	0	17	17	63
3	Eastbourne Eagles	40	23	1	16	14	61
4	Arena Essex Hammers	40	21	1	18	10	53
5	Coventry Bees	40	18	3	19	13	52
6	Reading Racers	40	20	1	19	10	51
7	Bradford Dukes	40	19	3	18	7	48
8	Ipswich Witches	40	17	0	23	8	42
9	King's Lynn Stars	40	15	4	21	6	40
10	Poole Pirates	40	17	0	23	6	40
11	Cradley Heath Heathens	40	16	0	24	5	37

M = Matches; W = Wins; D = Draws; L = Losses; Pts = Total Points

=== Fixtures and results ===
A Fixtures

Home \ Away	AE	BV	BRA	COV	CH	EAS	IPS	KL	PP	RR	WOL
Arena Essex		65–43	70–38	72–36	64–44	53–54	67–40	71–37	71–37	61–47	55–53
Belle Vue	71–37		65–41	60–47	63–45	62–46	66–42	77–31	78–30	68–40	57–51
Bradford	66–42	57–51		54–54	67–41	68–40	66–42	60–47	71–7	59–49	61–47
Coventry	67–41	73–34	60–48		56–52	62–46	70–38	62–46	57–51	64–44	42–66
Cradley Heath	56–52	59–49	52–55	52–54		58–50	62–46	57–51	56–52	50–58	53–55
Eastbourne	57–51	63–45	70–38	53–55	62–46		62–46	82–26	60–48	62–46	56–52
Ipswich	49–59	70–38	51–57	59–49	49–59	58–50		57.5–50.5	62–46	47–61	47–61
King's Lynn	52–55	55–53	36–42	54–54	69–39	36–36	35–42		65–43	54–54	56–52
Poole	51–57	56–52	63–45	58–50	66–42	56–52	62–46	61–47		56–52	60–48
Reading	51–57	59–47	68–40	57–51	65–42	49–59	62–45	75–33	57–48		57–51
Wolverhampton	65–43	63–44	65–43	65–43	61–47	64–44	65–43	63–45	61–46	68–39	

Legend: Blue = home team win; Yellow = draw; Red = away team win.

B Fixtures

Home \ Away	AE	BV	BRA	COV	CH	EAS	IPS	KL	PP	RR	WOL
Arena Essex		55–53	72–36	54–54	63–45	53–54	41–67	68–40	71–37	62–46	65–43
Belle Vue	76–32		61–47	67–41	60–45	58–50	62–44	65–43	77–30	56–51	57–51
Bradford	63–45	54–54		58–50	48–60	68–40	69–39	54–54	50–58	57–51	57–51
Coventry	55–53	53–55	60–48		63–45	52–56	50–58	69–39	63–45	64–44	51–57
Cradley Heath	67–41	48–60	66–42	51–57		56–42	74–34	62–45	57–51	58–50	56–52
Eastbourne	60–48	62–46	60–47	62–45	67–41		57–51	79–29	62–46	58–49	45–61
Ipswich	61–47	52–56	65–43	67–41	57–51	67–41		52–55	58–50	60–48	67–41
King's Lynn	58–50	58–50	63–44	55–53	62–46	74–34	64–44		70–38	69–39	60–48
Poole	52–56	60–47	51–57	61–47	58–50	63–45	57–51	63–45		50–58	63–45
Reading	66–42	58–50	64–44	59–49	64–44	53–55	55–53	60–48	70–38		58–50
Wolverhampton	66–42	53–54	56–52	63–45	62–46	61–46	53–55	62–46	73–35	60–48	

Legend: Blue = home team win; Yellow = draw; Red = away team win.

== Speedway Star Knockout Cup ==
The 1993 Speedway Star British League Knockout Cup was the 55th edition of the Knockout Cup for tier one teams. Bradford Dukes were the winners for a third consecutive year.

First round

Date	Team one	Score	Team two
08/07	Ipswich	55-53	Wolverhampton
24/05	Wolverhampton	64-43	Ipswich
22/05	Cradley Heath	59-49	Belle Vue
21/05	Arena Essex	72-36	Kings Lynn
21/05	Belle Vue	58-48	Cradley Heath
08/05	Kings Lynn	54-54	Arena Essex
16/07	Belle Vue	59-47	Cradley Heath
30/06	Cradley Heath	59-49	Belle Vue

Quarter-finals

Date	Team one	Score	Team two
20/08	Belle Vue	60-47	Wolverhampton
11/08	Wolverhampton	57-51	Belle Vue
31/07	Coventry	64-44	Poole
14/07	Poole	55-53	Coventry
05/07	Reading	63-45	Arena Essex
04/07	Bradford	66-42	Eastbourne
27/06	Eastbourne	63-45	Bradford
18/06	Arena Essex	67-41	Reading

Semi-finals

Date	Team one	Score	Team two
10/10	Belle Vue	61-46	Arena Essex
21/09	Arena Essex	67-41	Belle Vue
18/09	Bradford	61-47	Coventry
14/08	Coventry	54-54	Bradford

Final

First leg

16 October 1993

Bradford Dukes Kelvin Tatum 12 Sean Wilson 12 Gary Havelock 9 Antal Kocso 9 Simon Green 8 Paul Bentley 6 Darren Pearson 2	58 - 50	Arena Essex Hammers Josh Larsen 15 Leigh Adams 14 Leigh Lanham 8 Bo Petersen 7 Robert Ledwith 5 Neville Tatum 1 Colin White 0

Odsal Stadium

Second leg

22 October 1993

Arena Essex Hammers Leigh Adams 14 Josh Larsen 12 Bo Petersen 11 Neville Tatum 6 Robert Ledwith 6 Colin White 3 Leigh Lanham 2 Russell Etherington 1	55 - 53	Bradford Dukes Kelvin Tatum 15 Gary Havelock 13 Paul Pickering 12 Sean Wilson 6 Paul Bentley 4 Darren Pearson 3 Antal Kocso 0

Arena Essex Raceway

Bradford Dukes were declared Knockout Cup Champions, winning on aggregate 111-105.

== Fours ==
Reading Racers won the fours championship final (sponsored by H.E.A.T) and held at the East of England Arena on 25 July.

Final

Pos	Team	Pts	Riders
1	Reading	27	Jonsson 8, Mullett 8, Castagna 7, Olsson 4
2	Wolves	25	Ermolenko 8, Karlsson P
3	Belle Vue	11	Screen 6
4	Arena Essex	9	Larsen 3, Ravn 3

== Riders' Championship ==
Per Jonsson won the British League Riders' Championship. It was due to be run at Abbey Stadium in early October but was called off twice due to wet weather before finally taking place on 31 October.

Pos.	Rider	Total
1	(Sweden) Per Jonsson	14
2	(Sweden) Henka Gustafsson	13+3
3	(England) Chris Louis	13+2
4	(Australia) Leigh Adams	11
5	(Sweden) Peter Karlsson	10
6	(Denmark) Hans Nielsen	10
7	(Sweden) Tony Rickardsson	8
8	(England) Joe Screen	7
9	(Australia) Craig Boyce	6
10	(England) Simon Cross	6
11	(New Zealand) Gary Allan	6
12	(Australia) Jason Crump	5
13	(England) Kelvin Tatum	5
14	(Australia) Jason Lyons	3
15	(England) David Norris	3
16	(England) Glenn Cunningham (res)	2
17	(England) Simon Wigg	1
18	(England) Steve Camden (res)	0

- ef=engine failure, f=fell, x=excluded r-retired

== Leading averages ==
Rider	Team	Average
(United States) Sam Ermolenko	Wolverhampton	11.12
(Sweden) Per Jonsson	Reading	10.34
(Denmark) Hans Nielsen	Coventry	10.05
(United States) Greg Hancock	Cradley Heath	9.85
(United States) Ronnie Correy	Wolverhampton	9.62
(Australia) Leigh Adams	Arena Essex	9.49
(Sweden) Henrik Gustafsson	Kings Lynn	9.27
(Sweden) Tony Rickardsson	Ipswich	9.01
(United States) Billy Hamill	Cradley Heath	8.99
(England) Martin Dugard	Eastbourne	8.98

== Riders & final averages ==
Arena Essex

- (Australia) Leigh Adams 9.49
- (Denmark) Bo Petersen 8.42
- (Denmark) Brian Karger 8.34
- (United States) Josh Larsen 7.16
- (Denmark) Peter Ravn 7.12
- (England) Colin White 6.84
- (England) Troy Pratt 6.07
- (England) Robert Ledwith 5.78
- (England) Andy Galvin 4.31
- (England) Neville Tatum 3.16
- (England) Russell Etherington 1.23

Belle Vue

- (England) Joe Screen 8.75
- (United States) Bobby Ott 8.17
- (Australia) Jason Lyons 7.90
- (United States) Shawn Moran 7.58
- (Denmark) Frede Schött 6.72
- (England) Paul Smith 5.77
- (Canada) Shawn Venables 5.63
- (England) Max Schofield 5.17
- (England) Carl Stonehewer 4.84
- (England) Jon Armstrong 4.18
- (England) Peter Scully 3.69
- (England) Mike Lewthwaite 3.45

Bradford

- (England) Gary Havelock 8.89
- (England) Kelvin Tatum 8.86
- (Sweden) Jimmy Nilsen 7.60
- (England) Sean Wilson 7.21
- (Australia) Craig Hodgson 6.75
- (England) Paul Bentley 5.34
- (England) Darren Pearson 4.80
- (Hungary) Antal Kocso 4.76
- (England) Stuart Swales 4.32
- (England) Simon Green 3.46
- (England) Richard Smith 0.67

Coventry

- (Denmark) Hans Nielsen 10.05
- (Denmark) John Jørgensen 7.76
- (England) Simon Wigg 7.71
- (England) Andy Smith 7.47
- (Denmark) Brian Andersen 6.75
- (Denmark) Jacob Olsen 5.42
- (England) Andy Meredith 4.07
- (England) Chris Clarence 3.27
- (England) Mark Bruton 3.20
- (England) Jon Armstrong 3.14
- (England) Scott Kirton 2.50

Cradley Heath

- (United States) Greg Hancock 9.85
- (United States) Billy Hamill 8.99
- (England) Simon Cross 22
- (Denmark) Gert Handberg 6.15
- (England) Scott Smith 5.95
- (Denmark) Morten Andersen 5.84
- (England) Andy Grahame 5.20
- (England) Alan Grahame 4.64
- (England) Justin Walker 4.56
- (England) Anthony Boyd 3.22

Eastbourne

- (England) Martin Dugard 8.98
- (Sweden) Peter Nahlin 8.02
- (England) David Norris 7.33
- (England) Dean Barker 7.04
- (England) Andrew Silver 6.91
- (Sweden) Stefan Dannö 6.53
- (England) John Wainwright 5.73
- (England) Darren Grayling 5.48
- (England) Nathan Gaymer 3.80
- (England) Paul Dugard 3.04
- (England) Mark Bruton 1.52

Ipswich

- (Sweden) Tony Rickardsson 9.01
- (England) Chris Louis 8.36
- (New Zealand) Mitch Shirra 6.85
- (England) Shaun Tacey 6.62
- (Australia) Shane Parker 6.00
- (England) Savalas Clouting 5.98
- (England) Leigh Lanham 5.91
- (England) Ben Howe 4.99
- (Czech Republic) Zdeněk Tesař 4.63
- (Denmark) Claus Jacobsen 4.32
- (Poland) Miroslaw Kowalik 3.51
- (England) Lawrence Hare 1.57

King's Lynn

- (Sweden) Henka Gustaffson 9.27
- (England) Mark Loram 7.96
- (England) Richard Knight 6.90
- (Czech Republic) Bohumil Brhel 6.16
- (Australia) Glenn Doyle 5.99
- (England) Emmerson Fairweather 5.16
- (England) Darren Spicer 4.98
- (Czech Republic) Tomáš Topinka 4.70
- (England) Andy Mountain 3.11
- (England) Paul Dugard 3.10
- (England) Kevin Brice 3.03

Poole

- (Australia) Craig Boyce 7.40
- (Norway) Lars Gunnestad 6.97
- (Sweden) Jorgen Johansson 6.77
- (England) Steve Schofield 6.76
- (England) Ray Morton 6.31
- (United States) John Cook 5.63
- (England) Justin Elkins 5.14
- (England) Scott Swain 4.72
- (England) Matthew Cross 4.37
- (England) Martin Willis 3.46

Reading

- (Sweden) Per Jonsson 10.34
- (Italy) Armando Castagna 7.88
- (England) Dave Mullett 7.39
- (England) Jeremy Doncaster 6.83
- (Sweden) Tony Olsson 6.10
- (England) Phil Morris 5.66
- (Sweden) Kenneth Nystrom 4.83
- (Denmark) Peter Glanz 4.37
- (England) Lance Sealey 3.19

Wolverhampton

- (United States) Sam Ermolenko 11.12
- (United States) Ronnie Correy 9.62
- (Sweden) Peter Karlsson 8.10
- (Sweden) Mikael Karlsson 6.70
- (United States) Charles Ermolenko 6.33
- (England) Graham Jones 6.04
- (England) Stephen Morris 5.98
- (England) Gordon Kennett 4.62
- (England) Phil Ashcroft 4.14
- (England) Neil Evitts 3.90
- (England) John Wainwright 3.63
- (England) Craig Taylor 1.82

== See also ==
- List of United Kingdom Speedway League Champions
- Knockout Cup (speedway)
