= 1993 Overseas final =

1993 Overseas Final

Seasons
- ← 1992 1994 →

The 1993 Overseas Final was the thirteenth running of the Overseas Final as part of the qualification for the 1993 Speedway World Championship Final to be held in Pocking, Germany. The 1993 Final was held at the Brandon Stadium in Coventry, England on 13 June and was the second last qualifying round for Commonwealth and American riders. ultimate individual prize.

== 1993 Overseas Final ==
- 13 June
- (United Kingdom) Coventry, Brandon Stadium
- Qualification: Top 9 plus 1 reserve to the World Semi-final

Pos.	Rider	Total
1	(United Kingdom) Martin Dugard	13
2	(United States) Ronnie Correy	10+3
3	(United Kingdom) Joe Screen	10+2
4	(United States) Sam Ermolenko	9
5	(United States) Billy Hamill	9
6	(United States) Greg Hancock	9
7	(United Kingdom) Chris Louis	8
8	(United Kingdom) Gary Havelock	7
9	(Australia) Leigh Adams	7
10	(United Kingdom) Andy Smith	6+3
11	(New Zealand) Mitch Shirra	6+2
12	(United Kingdom) David Mullett	6+1
13	(Australia) Jason Lyons	6+0
14	(United States) Bobby Ott	5
15	(United Kingdom) David Norris	5
16	(United Kingdom) Richard Knight	2
Res	(United States) Josh Larsen	1
Res	(New Zealand) Mark Thorpe	-

== See also ==
- Motorcycle Speedway
