= 1990 Overseas final =

1990 Overseas Final

Seasons
- ← 1989 1991 →

The 1990 Overseas Final was the tenth running of the Overseas Final as part of the qualification for the 1990 Speedway World Championship Final to be held in Bradford, England. The 1990 Final was held at the Brandon Stadium in Coventry, England on 24 June and was the second last qualifying round for Commonwealth and American riders.

The Top 9 riders qualified for the Intercontinental Final to be held in Fjelsted, Denmark.

== 1990 Overseas Final ==
- 24 June
- (United Kingdom) Coventry, Brandon Stadium
- Qualification: Top 9 plus 1 reserve to the Intercontinental Final in Fjelsted, Denmark

Pos.	Rider	Total
1	(United Kingdom) Jeremy Doncaster	15
2	(Australia) Todd Wiltshire	13
3	(United States) Shawn Moran	10
4	(United States) Ronnie Correy*	9
5	(United Kingdom) Martin Dugard	9
6	(United Kingdom) Kelvin Tatum	8
7	(United States) Rick Miller	8
8	(United Kingdom) Simon Cross	7
9	(Australia) Troy Butler	7
10	(United Kingdom) Richard Knight	6+3
11	(United Kingdom) Gary Havelock	6+2
12	(United Kingdom) Mark Loram	6+1
13	(United Kingdom) Simon Wigg	6+0
14	(Australia) Leigh Adams	5
15	(United States) Billy Hamill	4
16	(New Zealand) David Bargh	1
Res	(United States) Kelly Moran	-
Res	(United Kingdom) John Davis	-

* Ronnie Correy replaced Greg Hancock

== See also ==
- Motorcycle Speedway
