= 2000 Overseas final =

2000 Overseas Final

Seasons
- ← 1999 2001 →

The 2000 Overseas Final was the twentieth running of the Overseas Final. The Final was held at the Poole Stadium in Poole, England on 18 June and was open to riders from the American Final and the Australian, British, New Zealand and South African Championships.

== 2000 Overseas Final ==
- 18 June
- (United Kingdom) Poole, Poole Stadium
- Qualification: Top 8 plus 1 reserve to the Intercontinental Final in Holsted, Denmark

Pos.	Rider	Total
1	(United States) Sam Ermolenko	15
2	(Australia) Jason Lyons	13+3
3	(Australia) Steve Johnston	13+2
4	(United Kingdom) Gary Havelock	13+1
5	(United Kingdom) David Howe	9
6	(United Kingdom) Martin Dugard	9
7	(United Kingdom) Paul Hurry	9
8	(United Kingdom) Sean Wilson	9
9	(United Kingdom) Shaun Tacey	7
10	(Australia) Mark Lemon	6
11	(United States) Josh Larsen	4
12	(United Kingdom) Scott Nicholls	4
13	(Australia) Craig Watson	3
14	(United States) Brent Werner	3
15	(New Zealand) Nathan Murray	2
16	(United Kingdom) Lee Richardson	0

== See also ==
- Motorcycle Speedway
