= Overseas final =

Motorcycle speedway competition

The Overseas final was a Motorcycle speedway final sanctioned by the FIM as a qualifying round for the Speedway World Championship between 1981 and 2001.

Introduced to the World Championship in 1981, it served as a qualifying round for Commonwealth and American riders. The Overseas final was originally intended to replace the Commonwealth final, but stayed on the World Championship calendar when the Commonwealth was re-introduced in 1986.

== Editions ==
All 21 Overseas finals were held in England.

Year	Venue	Winner	Runner-up	3rd place
1981	(United Kingdom) London; White City Stadium	(England) Dave Jessup	(England) Chris Morton	(United States) Bruce Penhall
1982	(United Kingdom) London; White City Stadium	(England) Dave Jessup	(England) Kenny Carter	(United States) Bruce Penhall
1983	(United Kingdom) Manchester; Belle Vue Stadium	(England) Phil Collins	(England) Kenny Carter	(New Zealand) Mitch Shirra
1984	(United Kingdom) Manchester; Belle Vue Stadium	(United States) Lance King	(Australia) Phil Crump	(United States) Shawn Moran
1985	(United Kingdom) Bradford; Odsal Stadium	(United States) Shawn Moran	(England) Kenny Carter	(United States) Lance King
1986	(United Kingdom) Coventry; Brandon Stadium	(United States) Sam Ermolenko	(England) Jeremy Doncaster	(England) Neil Evitts
1987	(United Kingdom) Bradford; Odsal Stadium	(New Zealand) Mitch Shirra	(England) Jeremy Doncaster	(United States) Kelly Moran
1988	(United Kingdom) Coventry; Brandon Stadium	(England) Simon Cross	(England) Kelvin Tatum	(England) Simon Wigg
1989	(United Kingdom) Coventry; Brandon Stadium	(United States) Sam Ermolenko	(England) Kelvin Tatum	(United States) Ronnie Correy
1990	(United Kingdom) Coventry; Brandon Stadium	(United Kingdom) Jeremy Doncaster	(Australia) Todd Wiltshire	(United States) Shawn Moran
1991	(United Kingdom) Bradford; Odsal Stadium	(United Kingdom) Kelvin Tatum	(United States) Sam Ermolenko	(United States) Billy Hamill
1992	(United Kingdom) Coventry; Brandon Stadium	(United Kingdom) Gary Havelock	(New Zealand) Mitch Shirra	(England) Kelvin Tatum
1993	(United Kingdom) Coventry; Brandon Stadium	(United Kingdom) Martin Dugard	(United Kingdom) Joe Screen	(United States) Ronnie Correy
1994	(United Kingdom) Coventry; Brandon Stadium	(United States) Sam Ermolenko	(United States) Greg Hancock	(Australia) Craig Boyce
1995	(United Kingdom) Coventry; Brandon Stadium	(Australia) Ryan Sullivan	(Australia) Leigh Adams	(Australia) Jason Lyons
1996	(United Kingdom) Coventry; Brandon Stadium	(United States) Chris Manchester	(Australia) Ryan Sullivan	(Australia) Jason Lyons
1997	(United Kingdom) Bradford; Odsal Stadium	(United Kingdom) Kelvin Tatum	(United Kingdom) Joe Screen	(United Kingdom) Sean Wilson
1998	(United Kingdom) Poole; Poole Stadium	(Australia) Jason Lyons	(United Kingdom) Joe Screen	(United Kingdom) Glenn Cunningham
1999	(United Kingdom) King's Lynn; Norfolk Arena	(United Kingdom) Mark Loram	(United Kingdom) Scott Nicholls	(Australia) Jason Lyons
2000	(United Kingdom) Poole; Poole Stadium	(United States) Sam Ermolenko	(Australia) Jason Lyons	(Australia) Steve Johnston
2001	(United Kingdom) Poole; Poole Stadium	(Australia) Jason Lyons	(United Kingdom) Gary Havelock	(United States) Sam Ermolenko

== See also ==
- Speedway World Championship
- Speedway Grand Prix
- Motorcycle speedway
