= 1989 Overseas final =

1989 Overseas Final

Seasons
- ← 1988 1990 →

The 1989 Overseas Final was the ninth running of the Overseas Final as part of the qualification for the 1989 Speedway World Championship Final to be held in Munich, West Germany. The 1989 Final was held at the Brandon Stadium in Coventry, England on 25 June and was the second last qualifying round for Commonwealth and American riders.

The Top 9 riders qualified for the Intercontinental Final to be held in Bradford, England.

== 1989 Overseas Final ==
- 25 June
- (United Kingdom) Coventry, Brandon Stadium
- Qualification: Top 9 plus 1 reserve to the Intercontinental Final in Bradford, England

Pos.	Rider	Total
1	(United States) Sam Ermolenko	13
2	(England) Kelvin Tatum	12
3	(United States) Ronnie Correy	11+3
4	(England) Simon Wigg	11+2
5	(England) Andy Grahame	9
6	(New Zealand) Mitch Shirra	9
7	(England) Andy Grahame	8
8	(England) Jeremy Doncaster	8
9	(England) Andy Smith	8
10	(Australia) Troy Butler	6+3
11	(England) Martin Dugard	6+2
12	(United States) Lance King	5
13	(Australia) Steven Davies	5
14	(United States) Rick Miller*	4
15	(England) Neil Collins	4
16	(England) Andy Phillips	1

* Rick Miller replaced Shawn Moran. Bobby Schwartz came in as the reserve rider

== See also ==
- Motorcycle Speedway
