= 1997 Overseas final =

1997 Overseas Final

Seasons
- ← 1996 1998 →

The 1997 Overseas Final was the seventeenth running of the Overseas Final. The Final was held at the Odsal Stadium in Bradford, England on 22 June and was open to riders from the American Final and the Australian, British, New Zealand and South African Championships.

== 1997 Overseas Final ==
- 22 June
- (United Kingdom) Bradford, Odsal Stadium
- Qualification: Top 8 plus 1 reserve to the Intercontinental Final in Västervik, Sweden

Pos.	Rider	Total
1	(United Kingdom) Kelvin Tatum	14+3
2	(United Kingdom) Joe Screen	14+2
3	(United Kingdom) Sean Wilson	11+3
4	(Australia) Craig Boyce	11+2
5	(United States) Sam Ermolenko	11+1
6	(United Kingdom) Gary Havelock	10
7	(Australia) Ryan Sullivan	9
8	(United Kingdom) Dean Barker	9
9	(Australia) Jason Crump	8
10	(United States) Chris Manchester	6
11	(Australia) Shane Parker	5
12	(United Kingdom) Carl Stonehewer	5
13	(United States) Charles Ermolenko	3
14	(New Zealand) Chris Penny	2
15	(United States) Charlie Venegas	2
16	(South Africa) Karoly Lechky	0

== See also ==
- Motorcycle Speedway
