= 1991 British League season =

British motorcycle speedway season

- League: British League
- No. of competitors: 13
- Champions: Wolverhampton Wolves
- Knockout Cup: Bradford Dukes
- Gold Cup: Berwick Bandits
- Individual: Sam Ermolenko
- Highest average: Sam Ermolenko
- Division/s below: British League (Div 2)

The 1991 British League season was the 57th season of the top tier of speedway in the United Kingdom and the 27th known as the British League.

== Summary ==
Wolverhampton Wolves won the league for the first time in their history. The club which was first founded in 1928 had only ever won the Provincial Midland League in 1962 and the Provincial League in 1963. They were led by their American star Sam Ermolenko, who became the first rider to push Hans Nielsen from the top of the averages after eight consecutive years at the top. The Wolves team relied on two more American riders, Ronnie Correy and Sam's younger brother Charles Ermolenko, in addition to Englishman Graham Jones to seal the title from Bradford. Bradford gained consolation by winning the Knockout Cup, led by English international pair Simon Wigg and Gary Havelock.

Wimbledon Dons started the season and managed to complete their Gold Cup fixtures but only ran until June before withdrawing from the league. The entire team was relocated to Arlington Stadium and raced as the Eastbourne Eagles for the remainder of the season.

== Final table ==
Pos	Team	PL	W	D	L	BP	Pts
1	Wolverhampton Wolves	24	19	1	4	10	49
2	Bradford Dukes	24	15	4	5	9	43
3	Cradley Heath Heathens	24	15	1	8	10	41
4	Belle Vue Aces	24	12	3	9	6	33
5	Berwick Bandits	24	13	0	11	6	32
6	Ipswich Witches	24	12	1	11	7	32
7	Coventry Bees	24	12	0	12	6	30
8	King's Lynn Stars	24	12	1	11	5	30
9	Oxford Cheetahs	24	8	3	13	6	25
10	Poole Pirates	24	8	2	14	5	23
11	Reading Racers	24	9	0	15	3	21
12	Eastbourne Eagles	24	6	3	15	3	18
13	Swindon Robins	24	5	1	18	2	13

M = Matches; W = Wins; D = Draws; L = Losses; Pts = Total Points

=== Fixtures and results ===
Home \ Away	BV	BER	BRA	COV	CH	EAS	IPS	KL	OX	PP	RR	SWI	WOL
Belle Vue		50–40	45–45	50–39	48–42	49–41	54–36	60–28	45–45	50–39	49–41	50–40	44–46
Berwick	60–0		49–41	47–42	42–48	53–35	48–41	48–42	35–55	50–40	50–40	54–36	47–43
Bradford	57–33	48–42		58–32	49–41	50–40	67–23	52–38	55–35	45–45	58–32	59–30	47.5–41.5
Coventry	49–41	49–41	40–50		48–41	41–49	53–37	56–34	46–44	48–42	56–34	50–40	41–49
Cradley Heath	51–39	50–40	49–41	48–42		53–37	48–42	57–32	46–40	47–43	52–38	52–37	53–37
Eastbourne	45–45	42–48	45–45	53–36	49–41		39–50	55–35	42–47	45–45	43–47	50–40	37–53
Ipswich	41–49	49–41	41–49	40–50	58–32	57–33		52–38	53–37	48–42	51–39	48–41	52–38
King's Lynn	47–43	56–34	37–53	29–60	45–45	51–39	48.5–40.5		54–36	50–40	46–44	46–44	40–50
Oxford	42–47	54–36	45–45	48–42	43–47	47–43	41–49	44–46		52–38	55–35	54–36	35–55
Poole	51–39	43–47	38–52	54–36	46–43	50–40	61–28	44–46	48–42		52–38	48–41	36–54
Reading	42–47	49–41	47–43	50–40	46–43	50–37	44–46	42–46	46–44	55–35		53–37	41–49
Swindon	55–35	41–49	52–38	44–46	44–46	43–47	52–38	41–49	45–45	47–43	47–43		43–47
Wolverhampton	60–30	59–31	53–37	56–34	46–43	49–41	45–45	60–30	51–39	60–30	56–34	48–42	

Legend: Blue = home team win; Yellow = draw; Red = away team win.

== British League Knockout Cup ==
The 1991 British League Knockout Cup was the 53rd edition of the Knockout Cup for tier one teams. Bradford Dukes were the winners.

First round

Date	Team one	Score	Team two
25/05	Cradley Heath	50-39	Ipswich
22/05	Wimbledon	52-38	Kings Lynn
20/05	Reading	48-42	Poole
16/05	Ipswich	46-44	Cradley Heath
13/05	Wolverhampton	50-40	Oxford
10/05	Oxford	49-41	Wolverhampton
30/04	Poole	47-43	Reading
27/04	Kings Lynn	40-50	Wimbledon
27/04	Swindon	46-44	Belle Vue
26/04	Belle Vue	55-35	Swindon
26/04	Berwick	47-43	Coventry
20/04	Coventry	46-44	Berwick

Quarter-finals

Date	Team one	Score	Team two
07/09	Cradley Heath	50-39	Reading
02/09	Reading	46-43	Cradley Heath
02/08	Berwick	43-47	Bradford
02/08	Eastbourne	50-40	Reading
16/07	Bradford	50-40	Berwick
01/07	Reading	56-34	Eastbourne
14/06	Belle Vue	44-46	Wolverhampton
10/06	Wolverhampton	42.5-47.5	Belle Vue

Semi-finals

Date	Team one	Score	Team two
02/09	Reading	46-43	Cradley
07/09	Cradley	50-39	Reading
05/10	Bradford	56-34	Belle Vue
11/10	Belle Vue	51-39	Bradford

Final

First leg

19 October 1991

Bradford Dukes Simon Wigg 14 Gary Havelock 10 Glenn Doyle 10 Craig Hodgson 8 Paul Thorp 7 Sean Wilson 1 Michael Graves 0	50 - 40	Cradley Heath Jan O. Pedersen 10 Billy Hamill 8 Alan Grahame 7 Simon Cross 7 Greg Hancock 3 Scott Smith 3 Wayne Garratt 2

Second leg

27 October 1991

Cradley Heath Jan O. Pedersen 11 Billy Hamill 10 Greg Hancock 9 Wayne Garratt 6 Simon Cross 5 Alan Grahame 2 Scott Smith 0	43 - 47	Bradford Dukes Simon Wigg 14 Gary Havelock 10 Paul Thorp 8 Glenn Doyle 5 Michael Graves 4 Craig Hodgson 3 Sean Wilson 3

Bradford Dukes were declared Knockout Cup Champions, winning on aggregate 97-83.

== Gold Cup ==
North Group

Pos	Team	P	W	D	L	Pts
1	Berwick	10	7	0	3	14
2	Wolverhampton	10	5	0	5	10
3	Cradley Heath	10	5	0	5	10
4	Belle Vue	10	5	0	5	10
5	Coventry	10	5	0	5	10
6	Bradford	10	3	0	7	6

South Group

Pos	Team	P	W	D	L	Pts
1	Oxford	12	10	0	2	20
2	Reading	12	7	0	5	14
3	Wimbledon	12	6	0	6	12
4	Swindon	12	6	0	6	12
5	Poole	12	5	1	6	11
6	King's Lynn	12	4	1	7	9
7	Ipswich	12	3	0	9	6

North

Home \ Away	BV	BER	BRA	COV	CH	WOL
Belle Vue		55–35	47–43	55–34	41–48	50–40
Berwick	55–35		66–24	56–33	50–40	48–42
Bradford	50–40	41–48		58–32	47–43	44–46
Coventry	57–33	62–27	52–38		48–42	46–44
Cradley Heath	48–42	59–31	59–31	48–42		41–49
Wolverhampton	42–48	41–49	63–27	60–30	49–41	

Legend: Blue = home team win; Yellow = draw; Red = away team win.

South

Home \ Away	IPS	KL	OX	PP	RR	SWI	WIM
Ipswich		48–41	49–41	39–51	39–51	42–48	46–44
King's Lynn	54–36		43–47	45–45	47–43	46–44	39–51
Oxford	53–37	53–37		60–30	48–42	51–39	47–43
Poole	52–38	44–46	48–42		39–51	44–46	45–44
Reading	49–40	49–41	44–46	55–35		44–46	51–39
Swindon	52–38	49–41	44–46	43–47	40–50		54–36
Wimbledon	51–39	51–39	44–46	47–43	58–32	46–44	

Legend: Blue = home team win; Yellow = draw; Red = away team win.

Final

Team one	Team two	1st leg	2nd leg
Berwick	Oxford	50–40	43—47

Berwick won 93–87 on aggregate.

== Riders' Championship ==
Sam Ermolenko won the British League Riders' Championship, sponsored by Dunlop Tyres. It was the held at Odsal Stadium on 20 October.

Pos.	Rider	Heat Scores	Total
1	(United States) Sam Ermolenko	3 3 3 3 3	15
2	(Denmark) Hans Nielsen	3 3 3 3 2	14
3	(England) Joe Screen	2 3 2 2 3	12
4	(United States) Ronnie Correy	3 1 3 2 2	11
5	(England) Kelvin Tatum	1 3 3 2 1	10
6	(England) Marvyn Cox	0 2 2 3 3	10
7	(Denmark) Jan Staechmann	2 2 2 1 2	9
8	(England) Gary Havelock	2 2 0 3 1	8
9	(Denmark) Jan O. Pedersen	3 1 0 0 3	7
10	(Sweden) Henka Gustafsson	1 0 1 2 1	5
11	(New Zealand) Dave Bargh	2 1 1 0 0	4
12	(England) Les Collins	0 2 0 1 1	4
13	(Australia) Leigh Adams	1 0 0 0 2	3
14	(England) Alan Grahame	0 1 2 0 0	3
15	(Australia) Shane Parker	1 0 1 1 0	3
16	(Denmark) Tommy Knudsen	0 0 1 1 0	2

- ef=engine failure, f=fell, x=excluded r-retired

== Leading final averages ==
Rider	Team	Average
(United States) Sam Ermolenko	Wolverhampton	10.74
(Denmark) Hans Nielsen	Oxford	10.50
(England) Kelvin Tatum	Berwick	9.92
(England) Gary Havelock	Bradford	9.89
(Sweden) Jimmy Nilsen	Berwick	9.63
(United States) Ronnie Correy	Wolverhampton	9.58
(Denmark) Jan O. Pedersen	Cradley Heath	9.54
(England) Andy Grahame	Eastbourne	9.44
(England) Martin Dugard	Oxford	9.12
(Sweden) Henrik Gustafsson	Kings Lynn	9.06

== Riders and final averages ==
Belle Vue

- (United States) Shawn Moran 8.45
- (United States) Kelly Moran 8.28
- (England) Neil Collins 7.60
- (England) Joe Screen 7.59
- (Sweden) Tony Olsson 7.32
- (England) Carl Stonehewer 6.09
- (England) Darren Sumner 5.22
- (England) Paul Smith 5.09
- (England) Nigel Leaver 3.88
- (Denmark) Frank Andersen 3.31

Berwick

- (England) Kelvin Tatum 9.92
- (Sweden) Jimmy Nilsen 9.63
- (England) Richard Knight 7.85
- (England) David Walsh 5.86
- (England) Scott Robson 4.73
- (England) David Blackburn 4.56
- (England) Rob Grant Sr. 3.89
- (Scotland) Kevin Little 2.65
- (England) Michael Lowrie 1.70
- (England) David Nagel 1.33

Bradford

- (England) Gary Havelock 9.89
- (England) Simon Wigg 8.43
- (England) Paul Thorp 8.32
- (Australia) Glenn Doyle 6.94
- (England) Sean Wilson 6.79
- (Australia) Craig Hodgson 6.61
- (England) Michael Graves 3.51

Coventry

- (Denmark) Tommy Knudsen 8.64
- (United States) Rick Miller 7.90
- (Denmark) John Jørgensen 7.56
- (Czech Republic) Roman Matoušek 6.77
- (Denmark) Peter Ravn 6.76
- (England) Michael Warren 4.84
- (England) Andy Hackett 4.39
- (England) Mark Robinson 3.38
- (England) Andy Meredith 2.77
- (England) David Haynes 0.19

Cradley Heath

- (Denmark) Jan O. Pedersen 9.54
- (United States) Billy Hamill 8.77
- (United States) Greg Hancock 8.24
- (Denmark) Gert Handberg 8.20
- (England) Alan Grahame 6.56
- (England) Simon Cross 5.29
- (England) Mark Robinson 4.46
- (England) Scott Smith 3.15
- (England) Wayne Garratt 3.07

Eastbourne/Wimbledon

- (England) Andy Grahame 9.44
- (United States) Bobby Ott 8.48
- (Italy) Armando Castagna 6.67
- (England) John Davis 6.59
- (England) Nathan Simpson 5.88
- (England) Gordon Kennett 4.98
- (Zimbabwe) Deon Prinsloo 4.75
- (England) Neville Tatum 4.29
- (Denmark) Jesper Olsen 3.59

Ipswich

- (England) Chris Louis 8.44
- (Sweden) Tony Rickardsson 8.15
- (England) Neville Tatum 7.33
- (Czech Republic) Zdenek Tesar 6.96
- (England) David Norris 6.39
- (Australia) Shane Parker 6.25
- (England) Alastair Stevens 5.17
- (England) Ben Howe 3.74

King's Lynn

- (Sweden) Henka Gustaffson 9.06
- (England) Mark Loram 8.28
- (Czech Republic) Bohumil Brhel 7.08
- (Sweden) Dennis Lofqvist 5.51
- (England) Nigel Leaver 4.50
- (England) Kevin Brice 4.23
- (England) Paul Fry 4.13

Oxford

- (Denmark) Hans Nielsen 10.50
- (England) Martin Dugard 9.12
- (Australia) Craig Boyce 7.17
- (England) Dean Barker 7.13
- (Australia) Mark Carlson 4.00
- (England) Glenn Cunningham 2.95
- (England) Kieran McCullagh 2.93
- (England) Spencer Timmo 2.64
- (England) Darren Grayling 1.91

Poole

- (England) Marvyn Cox 8.67
- (England) Steve Schofield 8.00
- (England) Gary Allan 6.43
- (Australia) Mick Poole 6.32
- (Australia) Tony Langdon 6.21
- (Denmark) Tom P. Knudsen 4.78
- (England) Alun Rossiter 4.08
- (England) Steve Leigh 2.06

Reading

- (England) Jeremy Doncaster 8.47
- (New Zealand) Mitch Shirra 8.43
- (Australia) Todd Wiltshire 8.41
- (Sweden) Jan Andersson 7.67
- (England) Dave Mullett 6.78
- (England) Ray Morton 6.50
- (Australia) Scott Humphries 4.47
- (Zimbabwe) Davd Steen 2.38
- (England) Terry Mussett 1.41

Swindon

- (Australia) Leigh Adams 8.55
- (England) John Davis 8.47
- (England) Andy Smith 7.75
- (Sweden) Peter Nahlin 7.12
- (England) Dean Standing 6.36
- (England) Andrew Silver 5.87
- (England) Paul Smith 4.49
- (England) Paul Dugard 4.38
- (Australia) Rod Colquhoun 4.00

Wolverhampton

- (United States) Sam Ermolenko 10.74
- (United States) Ronnie Correy 9.58
- (England) Graham Jones 7.25
- (United States) Charles Ermolenko 6.57
- (Australia) Scott Norman 5.32
- (England) Andy Phillips 5.32
- (England) Wayne Carter 4.29
- (Denmark) Lars Munkedal 3.75

== See also ==
- List of United Kingdom Speedway League Champions
- Knockout Cup (speedway)
