= 1995 Overseas final =

1995 Overseas Final

Seasons
- ← 1994 1996 →

The 1995 Overseas Final was the fifteenth running of the Overseas Final. With the advent of the Speedway Grand Prix series in 1995 to replace the traditional single meeting World Final which had been in place since the first running of the Speedway World Championship in 1936, the Overseas Final became part of the qualifying for the 1996 Speedway Grand Prix series.

The 1995 Final was held at the Brandon Stadium in Coventry, England on 11 June and was open to riders from the American Final and the Australian, British and New Zealand Championships. Though whereas for the previous four years those who qualified from the Overseas Final went into one of the two World Semi-finals, in 1995 riders qualified for the re-introduced Intercontinental Final to be held in Elgane, Norway.

== 1995 Overseas Final ==
- 11 June
- (England) Coventry, Brandon Stadium
- Qualification: Top 8 plus 1 reserve to the 1995 Intercontinental Final in Elgane, Norway

Pos.	Rider	Total
1	(Australia) Ryan Sullivan	14+3
2	(Australia) Leigh Adams	14+2
3	(Australia) Jason Lyons	12
4	(New Zealand) Mark Thorpe	11
5	(United Kingdom) Joe Screen	10
6	(Australia) Jason Crump	9
7	(United Kingdom) Martin Dugard	9
8	(Australia) Shane Parker	8+3
9	(United States) Chris Manchester	8+2
10	(United States) Charles Ermolenko	8+1
11	(United Kingdom) Dean Barker	5
12	(United States) Mike Faria	4
13	(United Kingdom) Martin Dixon	4
14	(United States) Brent Werner	3
15	(United Kingdom) Garry Stead	0
16	(United Kingdom) David Norris	0

== See also ==
- Motorcycle Speedway
