= 1994 Overseas final =

1994 Overseas Final

Seasons
- ← 1993 1995 →

The 1994 Overseas Final was the fourteenth running of the Overseas Final as part of the qualification for the 1994 Speedway World Championship Final to be held in Vojens, Denmark. The 1994 Final was held at the Brandon Stadium in Coventry, England on 12 June and was the second last qualifying round for Commonwealth and American riders.

== 1994 Overseas Final ==
- 12 June
- (United Kingdom) Coventry, Brandon Stadium
- Qualification: Top 9 plus 1 reserve to the World Semi-final

Pos.	Rider	Total
1	(United States) Sam Ermolenko	14
2	(United States) Greg Hancock	12+3
3	(Australia) Craig Boyce	12+2
4	(Australia) Leigh Adams	11
5	(Australia) Jason Crump	9
6	(United States) Josh Larsen	9
7	(United Kingdom) Mark Loram	8
8	(United Kingdom) Chris Louis	8
9	(United States) Billy Hamill	8
10	(United Kingdom) Joe Screen	7
11	(United States) Charles Ermolenko	6
12	(United Kingdom) Gary Havelock	5
13	(United Kingdom) Jeremy Doncaster	4
14	(United Kingdom) Martin Dugard	3
15	(United States) Mike Faria	2
16	(Australia) Jason Lyons	2
Res	(New Zealand) Mitch Shirra	-
Res	(United States) Chris Manchester	-

== Classification ==
Placing	Rider	Total	1	2	3	4	5	6	7	8	9	10	11	12	13	14	15	16	17	18	19	20	Pts	Pos	21
1	(United States) (3) Sam Ermolenko	14	3						3				3				3				2		14	1	
2	(United States) (6) Greg Hancock	12		3				3			3							2			1		12	2	3
3	(Australia) (7) Craig Boyce	12		2					2					3	3					2			12	3	2
4	(Australia) (8) Leigh Adams	11		1						3			2			3			2				11	4	
5	(Australia) (1) Jason Crump	9	2				3				1				0				3				9	5	
6	(United States) (12) Josh Larsen	9			0					2		3			1						3		9	6	
7	(United Kingdom) (2) Mark Loram	8	1					2				2				2				1			8	7	
8	(United Kingdom) (5) Chris Louis	8		0			2					1					2					3	8	8	
9	(United States) (9) Billy Hamill	8			1		1						0					3		3			8	9	
10	(United Kingdom) (14) Joe Screen	7				2		1					1		2							1	7	10	
11	(United States) (16) Charles Ermolenko	6				3				0	2						1			0			6	11	
12	(United Kingdom) (10) Gary Havelock	5			3			0						2			0		0				5	12	
13	(United Kingdom) (4) Jeremy Doncaster	4	0							1				1				0				2	4	13	
14	(United Kingdom) (11) Martin Dugard	3			2				1		0					0						0	3	14	
15	(United States) (13) Mike Faria	2				1	0							0		1					0		2	15	
16	(Australia) (15) Jason Lyons	2				0			0			0						1	1				2	16	
R1	(New Zealand) (R1) Mitch Shirra	0																					0	R1	
R2	(United States) (R2) Chris Manchester	0																					0	R2	
Placing	Rider	Total	1	2	3	4	5	6	7	8	9	10	11	12	13	14	15	16	17	18	19	20	Pts	Pos	21

m - exclusion for exceeding two minute time allowance • t - exclusion for touching the tapes • x - other exclusion • e - retired or mechanical failure • f - fell • ns - non-starter • nc - non-classify

gate A - inside	gate B	gate C	gate D - outside

== See also ==
- Motorcycle Speedway
