= 1989 British League season =

British motorcycle speedway season

- League: Sunbrite British League
- Champions: Oxford Cheetahs
- Knockout Cup: Cradley Heathens
- Individual: Shawn Moran
- Gold Cup: Oxford Cheetahs
- Highest average: Hans Nielsen
- Division/s below: 1989 National League

The 1989 British League season (also known as the Sunbrite British League for sponsorship reasons) was the 55th season of the top tier of motorcycle speedway in the United Kingdom and the 25th known as the British League.

== Summary ==
The Coventry Bees were the defending champions from 1988. The league was once again run over a 15-heat formula, with 7 riders per team.

Oxford Cheetahs bounced back to winning ways claiming their third title in five years. The team was led by their double world champion Hans Nielsen who by the end of the season would be world champion for the third time and top the averages for an incredible seventh season running. He was backed up by Simon Wigg, Martin Dugard, Andy Grahame, Marvyn Cox and Troy Butler, all of whom averaged from about 6 to 8 points for the season. The defending champions Coventry could only finish 5th after losing Tommy Knudsen for the season. Cradley Heath won their 8th Knockout Cup in 11 years (it would also be their last).

== Final table ==
Pos	Team	PL	W	D	L	BP	Pts
1	Oxford Cheetahs	32	22	1	9	13	58
2	Wolverhampton Wolves	32	19	2	11	12	52
3	Cradley Heathens	32	19	3	10	10	51
4	Belle Vue Aces	32	19	2	11	10	50
5	Coventry Bees	32	15	3	14	8	41
6	Swindon Robins	32	12	1	19	8	33
7	Reading Racers	32	13	1	18	5	32
8	Bradford Dukes	32	9	2	21	3	23
9	King's Lynn Stars	32	8	1	23	3	20

M = Matches; W = Wins; D = Draws; L = Losses; Pts = Total Points

== Fixtures and results ==
=== A fixtures ===
Home \ Away	BV	BRA	COV	CH	KL	OX	RR	SWI	WOL
Belle Vue		49–41	57–32	49–41	54–36	42–48	42–48	49–41	39–51
Bradford	39–51		48–42	44–46	55–35	49–40	44–46	50–40	44–46
Coventry	46–44	48–40		37–53	39–51	40–50	42–48	45–45	50–40
Cradley Heath	45–45	57–33	57–33		49–41	45–45	53–37	58–32	52–38
King's Lynn	33–57	54–36	44–46	38–52		38–52	62–28	48–42	39–51
Oxford	63–27	52–38	60–30	51–38	54–36		46–43	53–37	60–30
Reading	42–48	43–47	51–39	49–41	55–35	47–43		49–41	40–50
Swindon	52–38	50–40	43–47	33–57	52–38	39–51	47–43		43–47
Wolverhampton	48–42	55–35	44–46	45–45	58–32	53–37	53–36	59–31	

Legend: Blue = home team win; Yellow = draw; Red = away team win.

=== B fixtures ===
Home \ Away	BV	BRA	COV	CH	KL	OX	RR	SWI	WOL
Belle Vue		59–31	49–41	49–41	53–37	48–41	57–32	55–35	47–43
Bradford	45–45		44–46	43–46	56–34	49–41	42–48	51–39	57–33
Coventry	46–44	45–45		53–37	51–39	46–42	57–33	46–44	50–40
Cradley Heath	48–42	61–29	52–38		56–34	46–44	56–34	58.5–31.5	41–49
King's Lynn	42–47	53–37	48–42	47–43		34–56	49–41	44–46	45–45
Oxford	42–47	60–30	49–41	48–42	58–32		54–36	41–49	54–36
Reading	41–49	50–40	45–45	34–56	49–41	38–52		51–39	51–39
Swindon	56–33	55–35	42–48	54–36	54–36	44–46	51–39		47–43
Wolverhampton	51–39	60–30	57–32	48–42	46–44	43–46	61–29	49–41	

Legend: Blue = home team win; Yellow = draw; Red = away team win.

== British League Knockout Cup ==
The 1989 Speedway Star British League Knockout Cup was the 51st edition of the Knockout Cup for tier one teams. Cradley Heath Heathens were the winners for the fourth successive year if including the tied 1986 final.

First round

Date	Team one	Score	Team two
21/04	Belle Vue	57-33	King's Lynn
08/04	King's Lynn	38-52	Belle Vue

Quarter-finals

Date	Team one	Score	Team two
26/06	Reading	51-39	Belle Vue
10/06	Cradley Heath	50-40	Oxford
09/06	Belle Vue	45.5-44.5	Reading
09/06	Oxford	45-45	Cradley Heath
13/05	Coventry	45-45	Bradford
06/05	Bradford	46-44	Coventry
22/04	Swindon	45-45	Wolverhampton
10/04	Wolverhampton	49-41	Swindon

Semi-finals

Date	Team one	Score	Team two
26/08	Bradford	57-33	Wolverhampton
19/08	Cradley Heath	42-48	Reading
07/08	Wolverhampton	60-30	Bradford
31/07	Reading	40-50	Cradley Heath

Final

First leg

16 October 1989

Wolverhampton Wolves Ronnie Correy 9 Robert Pfetzing 8 Andy Phillips 7 Graham Jones 7 Jan Stæchmann 3 Brian Karger (guest) 3 Neil Collins 3	41 - 49	Cradley Heath Kelvin Tatum (guest) 13 Greg Hancock 11 Jimmy Nilsen (guest) 10 Gert Handberg 6 Alan Grahame 6 Simon Cross 2 John Bostin 1

Monmore Green Stadium

Second leg

26 October 1989

Cradley Heath Shawn Moran (guest) 14 Simon Cross 12 Kelvin Tatum (guest) 7 Gert Handberg 5 Greg Hancock 5 Alan Grahame 3 John Bostin 0	46 - 44	Wolverhampton Wolves Jimmy Nilsen (guest) 10 Graham Jones 9 Andy Phillips 6 Robert Pfetzing 6 Ronnie Correy 5 Neil Collins 4 Jan Stæchmann 4

Dudley Wood Stadium

Cradley Heath were declared Knockout Cup Champions, winning on aggregate 95-85.

== Riders' Championship ==
Shawn Moran won the British League Riders' Championship. It was the held at Belle Vue Stadium on 1 October.

Pos.	Rider	Heat Scores	Total
1	(United States) Shawn Moran	3 3 3 3 3	15
2	(Denmark) Hans Nielsen	3 3 3 3 2	14
3	(Denmark) Brian Karger	2 3 2 2 3	12
4	(England) Martin Dugard	1 2 1 2 3	9
5	(United States) Ronnie Correy	3 2 3 0 0	8
6	(Sweden) Jimmy Nilsen	0 1 3 1 3	8
7	(England) Kelvin Tatum	2 0 1 3 2	8
8	(England) Alan Grahame	0 2 2 2 2	8
9	(England) Richard Knight	2 0 2 2 1	7
10	(United States) Rick Miller	3 1 1 1 1	7
11	(England) Simon Wigg	1 1 2 3 0	7
12	(United States) Lance King	1 3 0 0 1	5
13	(England) Jeremy Doncaster	1 2 0 1 1	5
14	(Denmark) Peter Ravn	2 0 0 1 2	5
15	(England) Paul Thorp	0 1 1 0 0	2
16	(England) Glenn Hornby (res)	0 0	0
17	(England) Scott Smith (res)	0 0	0
18	(New Zealand) Mitch Shirra	0 r(inj)	0

- ef=engine failure, f=fell, x=excluded r-retired

== Leading final averages ==
Rider	Club	Average
(Denmark) Hans Nielsen	Oxford	10.91
(Denmark) Jan O. Pedersen	Cradley	10.22
(Denmark) Erik Gundersen	Cradley	9.97
(United States) Sam Ermolenko	Wolverhampton	9.85
(United States) Shawn Moran	Belle Vue	9.68
(England) Kelvin Tatum	Coventry	9.49
(England) Simon Cross	Cradley	9.13
(England) Jeremy Doncaster	Reading	8.61
(Sweden) Jimmy Nilsen	Swindon	8.41
(United States) Kelly Moran	Belle Vue	8.29

== Gold Cup ==
North Group

Pos	Team	P	W	D	L	Pts
1	Cradley Heath	6	4	0	2	8
2	Bradford	6	3	0	3	6
3	Belle Vue	6	3	0	3	6
4	Wolverhampton	6	2	0	4	4

South Group

Pos	Team	P	W	D	L	Pts
1	Oxford	8	6	1	1	13
2	Reading	8	5	0	3	10
3	Coventry	8	2	2	4	6
4	King's Lynn	6	2	2	4	6
5	Swindon	8	2	1	5	5

North Group

Home \ Away	BV	BRA	CH	WOL
Belle Vue		43–47	55–35	49–41
Bradford	51–39		55–35	43–47
Cradley Heath	47–43	46–44		49–41
Wolverhampton	42–47	51–39	39–51	

Legend: Blue = home team win; Yellow = draw; Red = away team win.

South Group

Home \ Away	COV	KL	OX	RR	SWI
Coventry		41–49	49–40	50–39	45–45
King's Lynn	45–45		45–45	42–48	51–39
Oxford	58–32	59–31		53–36	56–34
Reading	46–44	49–41	41–49		46–43
Swindon	46–44	48–42	41–49	44–46	

Legend: Blue = home team win; Yellow = draw; Red = away team win.

Final

Team one	Team two	Score
Cradley	Oxford	42–48, 36–54

== Riders and final averages ==
Belle Vue

- (United States) Shawn Moran 9.68
- (United States) Kelly Moran 8.29
- (Denmark) Peter Ravn 7.54
- (United States) Gary Hicks 7.17
- (England) Chris Morton 6.75
- (England) Joe Screen 6.40
- (England) Carl Stonehewer 5.50
- (England) Gordon Whitaker 3.41
- (England) Paul Smith 2.09
- (England) Mike Lewthwaite 1.85

Bradford

- (England) Paul Thorp 7.79
- (England) Neil Evitts 7.51
- (England) Andy Smith 7.27
- (England) Bryan Larner 5.40
- (Denmark) Henrik Kristensen 4.94
- (Australia) Glenn Doyle 4.76
- (Hungary) Antal Kocso 4.60
- (England) Michael Graves 4.17

Coventry

- (England) Kelvin Tatum 9.49
- (United States) Rick Miller 6.93
- (England) Sean Wilson 6.52
- (Denmark) John Jørgensen 6.39
- (England) Andy Hackett 5.49
- (Czech Republic) Roman Matoušek 5.27
- (Finland) Kai Niemi 4.69
- (England) Mike Bacon 2.95
- (England) Paul Smith 2.55

Cradley Heath

- (Denmark) Jan O. Pedersen 10.22
- (Denmark) Erik Gundersen 9.97
- (England) Simon Cross 9.13
- (Denmark) Gert Handberg 6.52
- (United States) Greg Hancock 6.06
- (England) Alan Grahame 5.78
- (England) John Bostin 3.00

Kings Lynn

- (England) Richard Knight 7.83
- (United States) Lance King 7.67
- (England) John Davis 6.74
- (Denmark) Allan Johansen 6.65
- (Italy) Armando Dal Chiele 5.03
- (Australia) Stephen Davies 4.93
- (Sweden) Dennis Löfqvist 4.82
- (England) Adrian Stevens 3.56
- (England) Paul Smith 3.14
- (England) Roger Horspool 1.50

Oxford

- (Denmark) Hans Nielsen 10.91
- (England) Simon Wigg 7.69
- (England) Martin Dugard 7.61
- (England) Andy Grahame 6.91
- (England) Marvyn Cox 6.80
- (Australia) Troy Butler 5.96
- (England) Paul Dugard 2.56
- (England) Kevin Pitts 1.64

Reading

- (England) Jeremy Doncaster 8.61
- (New Zealand) Mitch Shirra 7.62
- (Sweden) Tony Olsson 6.49
- (England) Carl Blackbird 5.52
- (Italy) Armando Castagna 5.47
- (England) Dave Mullett 5.09
- (England) Malcolm Holloway 4.38
- (South Africa) David Steen 2.56

Swindon

- (Sweden) Jimmy Nilsen 8.41
- (Denmark) Brian Karger 8.09
- (England) Andrew Silver 7.38
- (England) John Davis 6.67
- (Sweden) Peter Nahlin 6.24
- (United States) Bart Bast 5.05
- (England) Gary Chessell 4.88
- (Denmark) Tom P. Knudsen 4.00 (2 matches only)
- (England) David Smart 3.72

Wolverhampton

- (United States) Sam Ermolenko 9.85
- (United States) Ronnie Correy 7.86
- (England) Neil Collins 6.88
- (United States) Robert Pfetzing 6.61
- (England) Graham Jones 6.60
- (Denmark) Jan Staechmann 6.54
- (England) Andy Phillips 5.73

== See also ==
- List of United Kingdom Speedway League Champions
- Knockout Cup (speedway)
