= British League Riders' Championship =

Speedway competition

- Sport: motorcycle speedway
- Founded: 1965
- Country: United Kingdom

Notes
- replaced by Premier League Riders Championship competition below Div Two Riders Championship

The British League Riders Championship was an individual motorcycle speedway contest between the top riders (or two riders) with the highest average from each club competing in the British League in the UK, or the top division of the league during the period when it had two or more divisions.

== History ==
Similar tournaments had been held before the formation of the British League in 1965, including the Provincial League Riders' Championship, open to riders from the Provincial League. The championship has been sponsored by Player's No 10, Skol, Leyland Cars, Gauntlet, Daily Mirror, TNT Sameday and Dunlop.

The championship continued until the British League Riders' Championship was replaced with the Premier League Riders Championship in 1995.

== Results ==
Year	Winner	Team	2nd	Team	3rd	Team
1965	Barry Briggs	Swindon Robins	Jimmy Gooch	Oxford Cheetahs	Cyril Maidment	Belle Vue Aces
1966	Barry Briggs	Swindon Robins	Olle Nygren	Wimbledon Dons	Norman Hunter	West Ham Hammers
1967	Barry Briggs	Swindon Robins	Nigel Boocock	Coventry Bees	Ray Wilson	Long Eaton Archers
1968	Barry Briggs	Swindon Robins	Eric Boocock	Halifax Dukes	Ivan Mauger	Newcastle Diamonds
1969	Barry Briggs	Swindon Robins	Ivan Mauger	Belle Vue Aces	Jim Airey	Sheffield Tigers
1970	Barry Briggs	Swindon Robins	Anders Michanek	Newcastle Diamonds	Eric Boocock	Halifax Dukes
1971	Ivan Mauger	Belle Vue Aces	Barry Briggs	Swindon Robins	Jim McMillan	Glasgow Tigers
1972	Ole Olsen	Wolverhampton Wolves	Martin Ashby	Swindon Robins	Ronnie Moore	Wimbledon Dons
1973	Ivan Mauger	Exeter Falcons	Ray Wilson	Leicester Lions	Anders Michanek	Reading Racers
1974	Peter Collins	Belle Vue Aces	Ivan Mauger	Exeter Falcons	Phil Crump	Newport
1975	Peter Collins	Belle Vue Aces	Phil Crump	Newport	Martin Ashby	Swindon Robins
1976	Ole Olsen	Coventry Bees	Peter Collins	Belle Vue Aces	John Louis	Ipswich Witches
1977	Ole Olsen	Coventry Bees	Peter Collins	Belle Vue Aces	Michael Lee	Kings Lynn Stars
1978	Ole Olsen	Coventry Bees	Peter Collins	Belle Vue Aces	Steve Bastable	Cradley Heath Heathens
1979	John Louis	Ipswich Witches	Bruce Penhall	Cradley Heath Heathens	Michael Lee	Kings Lynn Stars
1980	Les Collins	Leicester Lions	Bruce Penhall	Cradley Heath Heathens	Larry Ross	Wimbledon Dons
1981	Kenny Carter	Halifax Dukes	Chris Morton	Belle Vue Aces	Shawn Moran	Sheffield Tigers
1982	Kenny Carter	Halifax Dukes	Shawn Moran	Sheffield Tigers	Hans Nielsen	Birmingham Brummies
1983	Erik Gundersen	Cradley Heath Heathens	Michael Lee	Poole Pirates	Hans Nielsen	Birmingham Brummies
1984	Chris Morton	Belle Vue Aces	Hans Nielsen	Oxford Cheetahs	Erik Gundersen	Cradley Heath Heathens
1985	Erik Gundersen	Cradley Heath Heathens	Peter Collins	Belle Vue Aces	Chris Morton	Belle Vue Aces
1986	Hans Nielsen	Oxford Cheetahs	Erik Gundersen	Cradley Heath Heathens	Shawn Moran	Sheffield Tigers
1987	Hans Nielsen	Oxford Cheetahs	Chris Morton	Belle Vue Aces	Kelly Moran	Sheffield Tigers
1988	Jan O. Pedersen	Cradley Heath Heathens	Erik Gundersen	Cradley Heath Heathens	Hans Nielsen	Oxford Cheetahs
1989	Shawn Moran	Belle Vue Aces	Hans Nielsen	Oxford Cheetahs	Brian Karger	Swindon Robins
1990	Hans Nielsen	Oxford Cheetahs	Kelly Moran	Belle Vue Aces	Ronnie Correy	Wolverhampton Wolves
1991	Sam Ermolenko	Wolverhampton Wolves	Hans Nielsen	Oxford Cheetahs	Joe Screen	Belle Vue Aces
1992	Joe Screen	Belle Vue Aces	Per Jonsson	Reading Racers	Gary Havelock	Bradford Dukes
1993	Per Jonsson	Reading Racers	Henka Gustafsson	Kings Lynn Stars	Chris Louis	Ipswich Witches
1994	Sam Ermolenko	Wolverhampton Wolves	Hans Nielsen	Coventry Bees	Martin Dugard	Eastbourne Eagles

== See also ==
- List of United Kingdom Speedway League Riders' champions
- Speedway in the United Kingdom
