= 1988 Overseas final =

Danish sporting event

1988 Overseas Final

Seasons
- ← 1987 1989 →

The 1988 Overseas Final was the eighth running of the Overseas Final as part of the qualification for the 1988 Speedway World Championship Final to be held in Vojens, Denmark. The 1988 Final was held at the Brandon Stadium in Coventry, England on 12 July and was the second last qualifying round for Commonwealth and American riders.

The Top 9 riders qualified for the Intercontinental Final to be held in Vetlanda, Sweden.

== 1988 Overseas Final ==
- 12 July
- (United Kingdom) Coventry, Brandon Stadium
- Qualification: Top 9 plus 1 reserve to the Intercontinental Final in Vetlanda, Sweden

Pos.	Rider	Total
1	(England) Simon Cross	13+3
2	(England) Kelvin Tatum	13+2
3	(England) Simon Wigg	13+1
4	(England) Chris Morton	12
5	(England) Marvyn Cox	10
6	(New Zealand) Mitch Shirra	10
7	(England) Richard Knight	8
8	(United States) Sam Ermolenko	8
9	(England) John Davis	7
10	(England) Andy Smith	6+3
11	(United States) Mike Faria	6+2
12	(United States) Robert Pfetzing	5
13	(United States) Rick Miller	4
14	(United States) Bobby Schwartz	3
15	(England) Neil Evitts	3
16	(Australia) Craig Hodgson	0

== See also ==
- Motorcycle Speedway
