= 2001 Overseas final =

2000 Overseas Final

Seasons
- ← 1999 none →

The 2001 Overseas Final was the twenty-first and last running of the Overseas Final. The Final was held at the Poole Stadium in Poole, England on 17 June and was open to riders from the North American Final and the Australian, British, New Zealand and South African Championships.

== 2001 Overseas Final ==
- 17 June
- (United Kingdom) Poole, Poole Stadium
- Qualification: Top 8 plus 1 reserve to the Intercontinental Final in Västervik, Sweden

Pos.	Rider	Total
1	(Australia) Jason Lyons	15
2	(United Kingdom) Gary Havelock	13
3	(United States) Sam Ermolenko	11+3
4	(United Kingdom) Scott Nicholls	11+2
5	(United States) John Cook	9
6	(United Kingdom) Sean Wilson	9
7	(Australia) Steve Johnston	9
8	(United Kingdom) Stuart Robson	8
9	(Canada) Chris Slabon	7+3
10	(United Kingdom) Paul Hurry	7+2
11	(Australia) Nigel Sadler	6
12	(United States) Billy Janniro	4
13	(Australia) Brett Woodifield	4
14	(Australia) Shane Parker	4
15	(United Kingdom) Paul Fry	2
16	(United States) Bobby Hedden	0

== See also ==
- Motorcycle Speedway
