= 1991 Overseas final =

1991 Overseas Final

Seasons
- ← 1990 1992 →

The 1991 Overseas Final was the eleventh running of the Overseas Final as part of the qualification for the 1991 Speedway World Championship Final to be held in Gothenburg, Sweden. The 1991 Final was held at the Odsal Stadium in Bradford, England on 23 June and was the second last qualifying round for Commonwealth and American riders.

With the (temporary) ending of the Intercontinental Final, the Top 9 riders from the Overseas Final qualified for the new World Semi-final's.

== 1991 Overseas Final ==
- 23 June
- (United Kingdom) Bradford, Odsal Stadium
- Qualification: Top 9 plus 1 reserve to the World Semi-final

Pos.	Rider	Total
1	(United Kingdom) Kelvin Tatum	13
2	(United States) Sam Ermolenko	12+3
3	(United States) Billy Hamill	12+2
4	(United Kingdom) Andy Smith	11
5	(United Kingdom) Paul Thorp	10
6	(United States) Ronnie Correy	9
7	(United Kingdom) Jeremy Doncaster	7
8	(New Zealand) Mitch Shirra	7
9	(United States) Kelly Moran	7
10	(Australia) Todd Wiltshire	6+3
11	(Australia) Glenn Doyle	6+2
12	(United Kingdom) Joe Screen	5
13	(United States) Rick Miller	4
14	(United Kingdom) Gary Havelock	4
15	(Australia) Leigh Adams	4
16	(United Kingdom) Neil Collins	3

== See also ==
- Motorcycle Speedway
