= 1998 Overseas final =

1998 Overseas Final

Seasons
- ← 1997 1999 →

The 1998 Overseas Final was the seventeenth running of the Overseas Final. The Final was held at the Poole Stadium in Poole, England on 14 June and was open to riders from the American Final and the Australian, British, New Zealand and South African Championships.

== 1998 Overseas Final ==
- 14 June
- (United Kingdom) Poole, Poole Stadium
- Qualification: Top 8 plus 1 reserve to the Intercontinental Final in Vojens, Denmark

Pos.	Rider	Total
1	(Australia) Jason Lyons	15
2	(United Kingdom) Joe Screen	12
3	(United Kingdom) Glenn Cunningham	11
4	(United Kingdom) Kelvin Tatum	10
5	(United States) Sam Ermolenko	10
6	(United Kingdom) Gary Havelock	10
7	(Australia) Mark Lemon	9
8	(United Kingdom) Paul Hurry	9
9	(United Kingdom) Simon Wigg	7
10	(United States) Brent Werner	5
11	(Australia) Steve Johnston	5
12	(United Kingdom) Savalas Clouting	5
13	(New Zealand) Tony Atkins	3
14	(United Kingdom) Scott Nicholls	3
15	(United States) Chris Manchester	1
16	(South Africa) Karoly Lechky	0

== See also ==
- Motorcycle Speedway
