= 1996 Overseas final =

1996 Overseas Final

Seasons
- ← 1995 1997 →

The 1996 Overseas Final was the sixteenth running of the Overseas Final. The Final was held at the Brandon Stadium in Coventry, England on 9 June and was open to riders from the American Final and the Australian, British and New Zealand Championships.

== Controversy ==
The top 8 riders were to have qualified for the 1996 Intercontinental Final to be held in Holsted, Denmark. However, in a controversial decision the FIM disqualified all riders following the meeting, with the exception of Ryan Sullivan (2nd), Kelvin Tatum (5th) and Mark Lemon (14th), for refusing to start the meeting on solid block tyres. This led to the FIM putting forward the first 13 riders from the Scandinavian Final to make up the Intercontinental Final shortfall (originally it was to be 8 riders from each of the Overseas and Scandinavian Finals who advanced to the Intercontinental Final).

== 1996 Overseas Final ==
- 9 June
- (United Kingdom) Coventry, Brandon Stadium
- Qualification: See above

Pos.	Rider	Heat Scores	Total
1	(United States) Chris Manchester	(3,3,3,3,2)	14
2	(Australia) Ryan Sullivan	(3,3,1,2,3 +3)	12+3
3	(Australia) Jason Lyons	(3,3,2,3,1 +2)	12+2
4	(United Kingdom) Carl Stonehewer	(1,1,3,3,3)	11
5	(United Kingdom) Kelvin Tatum	(3,3,1,2,1)	10
6	(United States) Mike Faria	(0,2,3,1,3)	9
7	(Australia) Tony Langdon	(2,0,2,3,2)	9
8	(United Kingdom) David Norris	(1,0,3,2,2)	8
9	(United Kingdom) Ray Morton	(2,2,0,1,2 +3)	7+3
10	(Australia) Mick Poole	(2,0,2,0,3 +2)	7+2
11	(United Kingdom) Ben Howe	(2,1,0,2,1)	6
12	(United Kingdom) Simon Cross	(1,2,1,0,1)	5
13	(Australia) Mark Lemon	(0,1,2,1,0)	4
14	(United Kingdom) David Walsh	(0,2,1,1,0)	4
15	(United States) Charlie Venegas	(1,0,0,0,0)	1
16	(United States) Bobby Hedden	(0,1,0,0,0)	1

== See also ==
- Motorcycle Speedway
