= 1999 Overseas final =

1999 Overseas Final

Seasons
- ← 1998 2000 →

The 1999 Overseas Final was the nineteenth running of the Overseas Final. The Final was held at the Norfolk Arena in King's Lynn, England on 13 June and was open to riders from the American Final and the Australian, British, New Zealand and South African Championships.

== 1999 Overseas Final ==
- 13 June
- (United Kingdom) King's Lynn, Norfolk Arena
- Qualification: Top 8 plus 1 reserve to the Intercontinental Final in Poole, England

Pos.	Rider	Total
1	(United Kingdom) Mark Loram	15
2	(United Kingdom) Scott Nicholls	14
3	(Australia) Jason Lyons	13
4	(Australia) Todd Wiltshire	11
5	(United Kingdom) Carl Stonehewer	11
6	(United Kingdom) Gary Havelock	10
7	(United Kingdom) Paul Hurry	8
8	(United Kingdom) Sean Wilson	8
9	(United States) Josh Larsen	6
10	(United Kingdom) Dean Barker	5
11	(Australia) Nigel Sadler	5
12	(Australia) Frank Smart	5
13	(United Kingdom) Stuart Robson	5
14	(United States) Jim Sisemore	2
15	(United States) Mike Faria	2
16	(United States) Bart Bast	0

== See also ==
- Motorcycle Speedway
