= Charles Ermolenko =

American speedway rider

- Born: 9 November 1968 (age 58); Artesia, California, United States

Career history
- 1991–1994, 1997: Wolverhampton Wolves
- 1995: Glasgow Tigers
- 1996: Long Eaton Invaders
- 1997: King's Lynn Stars

Team honours
- 1991: British league winners

Charles Anthony Ermolenko (born 9 November 1968) is an American former international speedway rider. He earned 9 caps for the United States national speedway team.

== Speedway career ==
Ermolenko rode in the top tier of British Speedway from 1991 to 1997, first riding for Wolverhampton Wolves in 1991. That season he was an integral part of the Wolves team that won the league during the 1991 British League season.

Ermolenko would later ride for Glasgow Tigers, Long Eaton Invaders and King's Lynn Stars.

== Family ==
Ermolenko's older brother Sam is a former speedway world champion.
