= Bobby Ott =

American speedway rider (born 1962)

- Born: 17 November 1962 (age 64); Inglewood, California, United States

Career history
- 1984: Poole Pirates
- 1990, 1992–1993: Belle Vue Aces
- 1991: Wimbledon Dons
- 1991: Eastbourne Eagles
- 1994–1995: King's Lynn Stars
- 1996: Hull Vikings

Team honours
- 1992, 1993: World Cup
- 1993: British League

Robert William Ott (born 17 November 1962 in Inglewood, California) is a former international motorcycle speedway rider form the United States. He earned 15 caps for the United States national speedway team.

== Career ==
Ott began his British leagues career when he rode a couple of times for Poole Pirates in 1984. However, the appearance was a short one and he did not return to British speedway again until six years later, when he rode for Belle Vue Aces during the 1990 British League season. He made an impact this time, finishing third in the Belle Vue averages behind fellow American's Shawn Moran and Kelly Moran.

The following season, in 1991, Ott started in Wimbledon Dons colours but the London club disbanded in June and were taken over by the Eastbourne Eagles promotion. He enjoyed a strong season in 1991, recording an 8.48 average. He returned to Manchester and Belle Vue in 1992 and was a significant rider for the Aces. It was during 1992 that he also represented United States national speedway team in the 1992 Speedway World Team Cup. He helped the United States claim the gold medal in the final at Kumla Speedway to become World champions.

The success continued as Ott helped Belle Vue become league champions during the 1993 British League season and he again rode for the United States in the 1993 Speedway World Team Cup final at Brandon Stadium and claimed a second World cup winner's medal.

Ott had two seasons at King's Lynn Stars before riding one final season in 1996 for Hull Vikings. He topped the team averages in both 1995 and 1996.
