= Sean Wilson (speedway rider) =

British motorcycle speedway rider

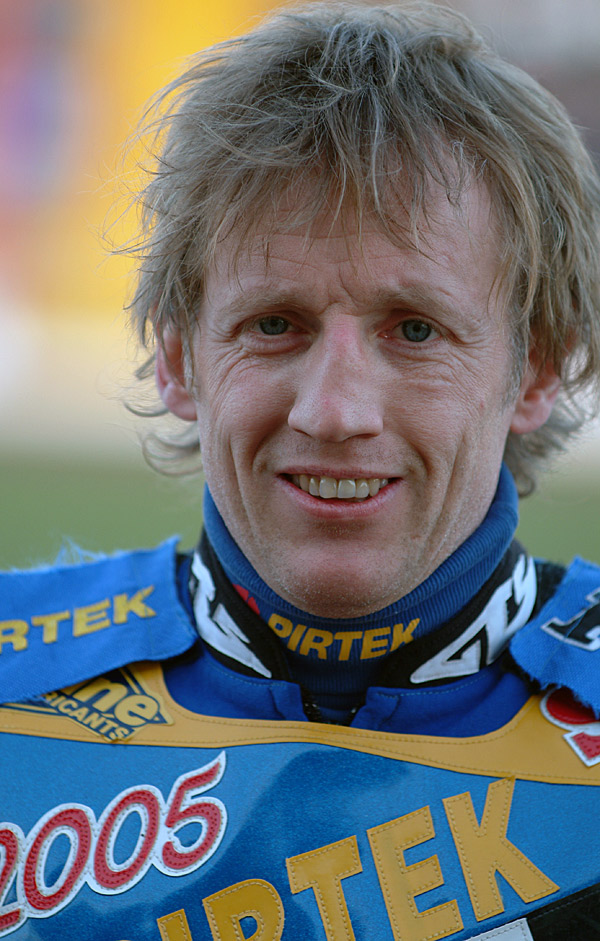
- Born: 7 November 1969 (age 57); York, England
- Nationality: British (English)

Career history

Great Britain
- 1986-1988, 1999-2005: Sheffield Tigers
- 1989-1990, 1997-1998: Coventry Bees
- 1990: King's Lynn Stars
- 1991-1993, 1995-1996: Bradford Dukes

Sweden
- 2000-2003: Västervik

Poland
- 2000: Lublin
- 2001-2002: Opole
- 2003: Rawicz

Individual honours
- 1999, 2003, 2005: Premier League Riders Champion

Team honours
- 1991, 1992, 1993: KO Cup winner
- 1997: Craven Shield Winner
- 1999, 2002: Premier League Champion
- 1995, 2002: Premier League KO Cup Winner
- 2001: Premier Trophy Winner
- 1999, 2002: Young Shield Winner
- 1999, 2000: Premier League Fours Champion

Sean Wilson (born 7 November 1969 in York, England) is a former international motorcycle speedway rider. He earned 23 international caps for the England national speedway team and two caps for the Great Britain team.

== Career summary ==
Wilson had a career spanning 20 years, starting and finishing at Sheffield Tigers.

Wilson's first three seasons were with Sheffield, starting during the 1986 British League season. He would average around the 6 point mark in his early career. After joining Coventry Bees in 1990, he began to consolidate his form and enjoyed two solid seasons before signing for Bradford Dukes. It was at Bradford that he experienced his first success, being part of the 1991 British League season Knockout Cup winning team.

WIlson then won two more Knockout Cups with Bradford in 1992 and 1993 and was an integral part of the Bradford team. Another cup win ensued in 1995 and Wilson rode for the Dukes until the end of the 1996 season. In 1997, he returned to Coventry winning the Craven Shield and in 1998 he spent the season with Belle Vue Aces.

His best individual years came following his return to his first club Sheffield in 1999. he helped the club win the league and Young Shield and also won the Premier League Riders Championship, held on 12 September at his home track of Owlerton Stadium. Also in 1999, he was part of the Sheffield four that won the Premier League Four-Team Championship, which was held on 29 August 1999, at the East of England Arena.

Wilson went on to win the Riders' Championship twice more, the first of which was held on 28 September 2003 at Owlerton Stadium.

Wilson's career ended early due to a number of injuries. In 2004, whilst riding in Joe Screen's testimonial at Belle Vue Stadium he crushed the C7 vertebrate in his neck leaving him in a neck brace for several months. He returned in 2005, winning his third final Riders' Championship on 18 September 2005. However, following a dislocated shoulder and a fractured humerus, he was subsequently, much to his disappointment, released at the end of 2005 which triggered his retirement.

== After retirement ==
Wilson now has a speedway engine building business and counts former world champion Gary Havelock, Kyle Legault and David Howe amongst his past and present customers.
