= Sam Ermolenko =

American speedway rider

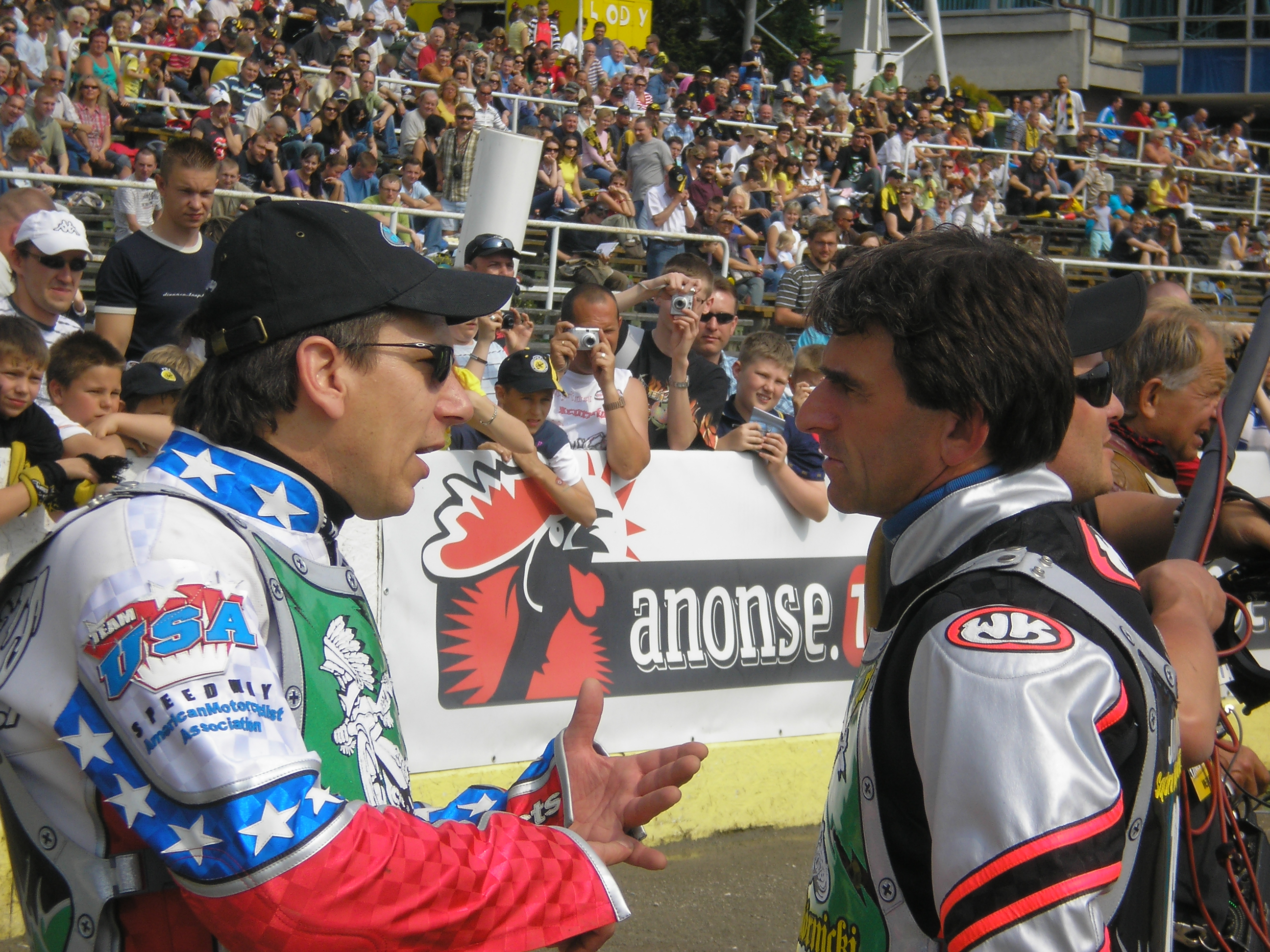
- Sam Ermolenko (left) and Roman Jankowski
- Born: November 23, 1960 (age 65); Maywood, California, USA
- Nickname: Sudden Sam
- Nationality: American

Career history

Great Britain
- 1983–1984: Poole Pirates
- 1986–1995, 1998, 2001, 2003–2004: Wolverhampton Wolves
- 1996: Sheffield Tigers
- 1997, 2002: Belle Vue Aces
- 1999: Hull Vikings
- 2005: Peterborough Panthers

Poland
- 1992–1994: Bydgoszcz
- 1995–1996, 1999–2000: Łódź
- 1997: Częstochowa
- 1998: Gdańsk
- 2001: Opole
- 2002: Warszawa

Denmark
- 1991: Slangerup
- 1996: Vojens

Sweden
- 1992–1998: Skepparna/Västervik
- 1999–2003: Valsarna
- 2005: Luxo Stars
- 2006: Rospiggarna

Individual honours
- 1993: World Champion
- 1985, 1987, 1995: World Championship bronze
- 1986, 1989, 1994, 2000: Overseas Champion
- 1993, 1994: American Champion
- 1991, 1994, 1996: UK Riders' champion
- 2003: Scottish Open Champion
- 1986: Pride of the East
- 1987: Olympique

Team honours
- 1990, 1992, 1993, 1998,: World Team Cup
- 1992: World Pairs Champion
- 1991: British League Champion
- 1999: Swedish Elitserien Champion

Guy Allen Ermolenko (born November 23, 1960 Maywood, California) is a former motorcycle speedway rider. During his career he was known as Sam Ermolenko. In 1993, he won the Speedway World Championship.

== Career ==
=== Early career ===
After originally showing an interest in motocross, Ermolenko began riding in the Californian speedway circuit. As he wore red leathers, former World Champion Barry Briggs suggested the nickname of "The mad Russian" (Due to Sam's family roots) although it is believed this is not something Sam himself was keen on.

=== 1983 to 1992 ===
After some liberal success in California, Ermolenko moved over to the United Kingdom to race for the Poole Pirates for the 1983 British League season. He soon become a big hit with fans in Dorset and was welcomed back in 1984, where he improved his average to 6.71.

Ermolenko's breakthorugh year was 1985 because he qualified for the 1985 World Final at Bradford's Odsal Stadium and came within a whisker of winning the World Title, narrowly losing out after a run-off with Danish duo Hans Nielsen and (eventual winner) Erik Gundersen.

In 1986, Ermolenko returned to Britain after joining the Wolverhampton Wolves for the 1986 British League season, he established himself as one of the world's leading riders and averaged 9.72. He won the 1986 Overseas Final on the way to his second World final appearance where he finished 6th. The following year in 1987, he won the American final on the way to a third consecutive World final. The 1987 Individual Speedway World Championship was held over two days and he led going into day two but was overtaken by Hans Nielsen and had to settle for bronze again.

Ermolenko topped the Wolves averages for the third season running during the 1988 British League season. He also won the American final again on the way to a fourth World final appearance in Vojens, Denmark, where he finished fourth. In 1989, he was having a great season, winning the 1989 Overseas Final and American final but injured his back in a horrific Long track motorcycle racing crash and was out of action for over six months. He could not recover in time for the 1990 World Championship and failed to get past the American round, finishing 18th out 20. His form did get better and he finished top scorer for Wolves again in the 1990 British League season and in September helped the USA win the 1990 Speedway World Team Cup.

During the 1991 British League season, Ermolenko helped Wolves win the title, won the British League Riders' Championship held at Odsal Stadium on 20 October and topped the league's leading averages. He finished seventh in the 1991 Individual Speedway World Championship. The following year was also successful, he won both the World Pairs and World Team Cup as the USA captain. He also topped the 1992 British League season averages again and finished 8th in the 1992 Individual Speedway World Championship. Ermolenko also rode for Västervik in the Swedish elite league from 1992. He was top scorer for them for seven seasons.

== World Title year ==
The 1993 season was supposed to see the last of the 'one off' world finals before the Grand Prix was introduced (this was not the case and the GP system did not begin until 1995) Ermolenko was again one of the pre-season favourites. At the world final in Pocking, Germany, Sam had a fantastic start to the meeting winning his first three rides. In Heat 15, he met fellow title contender and three-time World Champion Hans Nielsen. In the first staging of the race, Nielsen was adjudged to have knocked Ermolenko off his machine and was excluded. In the re-run, Ermolenko shed a chain entering the first bend, however fellow American Billy Hamill ran into the back of him and the referee controversially ordered a re-run with the three remaining riders. Ermolenko won the third staging of the race and after gaining an unbeaten 12 points from his four rides, he could afford the luxury of coming last in his final outing and still be crowned World Champion.

After his World final triumph, Ermolenko again led the USA to Pairs and Team cup glory. At the latter, he beat his old rival Nielsen in a last heat decider on the Dane's home Coventry circuit. He was also unbeaten as the USA whitewashed England in a three match Test Series. It also looked as though he would again lead Wolves to league title triumph however a broken leg put an abrupt end to his season and this combined with injuries to other key members of the side, meant Wolves narrowly missed out on winning the league to the Belle Vue Aces.

== 1994 to 2005 ==
The 1994 season started late for Ermolenko as he recovered from the previous season's injuries. He did again qualify for the World Final (in Vojens) winning the Overseas title en route. However, after a controversial exclusion in his opening ride, he scored only six points to finish down the field. The season did finish on a high note though, as he led Wolves to a respectable third-place finish in the league and he won the British League Riders' Championship on 9 October, for a second time.

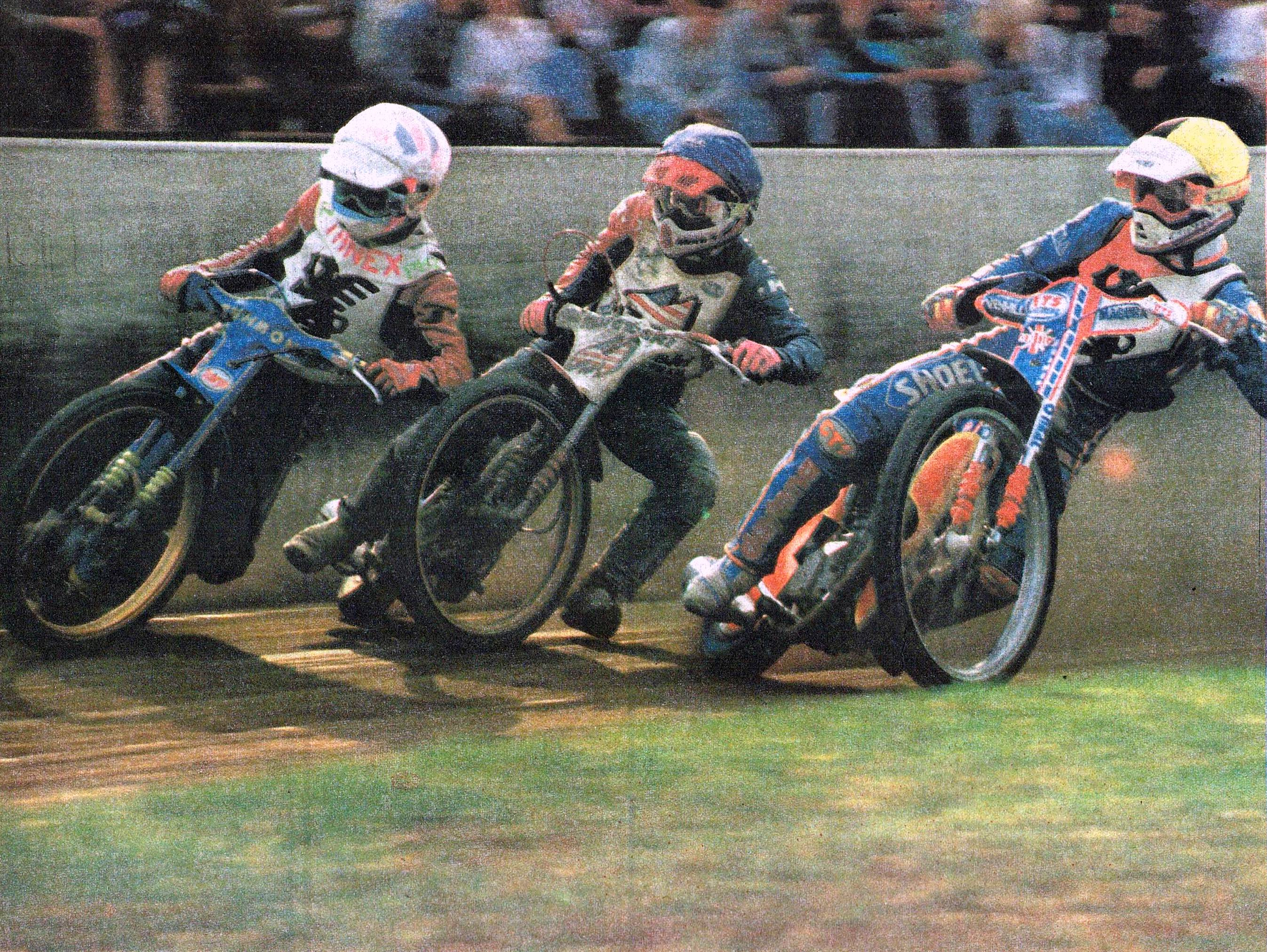
Sam Ermolenko (centre) in 1992

1995 saw the inaugural Speedway Grand Prix season. Ermolenko started his first Grand Prix campaign slowly but after a stronger finish to the season, he finished third in the World. The 1996 season was his second and final year in the GP series, finishing one place below automatic qualifying place for the next years series. He did though once again win the British League Riders Championship in 1996, this time representing Sheffield Tigers. He did attempt to qualify back into the GP's in future years but never made it. He did however continue to figure prominently in the British league.

Ermolenko rode for Sheffield Tigers in 1996 and won the Premier League Riders Championship at Odsal Stadium on 19 October. It was the third time that Ermolenko had won the Riders' Championship trophy. He had qualified for the semi finals with just seven points and then won the final when Chris Louis was leading on the final lap before suffering an engine failure.

Ermolenko rode for Belle Vue Aces in 1997 before returning to Wolverhampton in 1998. Already a three-time winner of the Speedway World Team Cup (1990, 1992 and 1993), Ermolenko would win his fourth title with the USA in 1998. This would be the sixth and final World Championship of his career.

In 1999, Ermolenko helped Hull Vikings in their short stint in the top league before returning to Wolves in 2000 and 2001. In 2000, he won the Overseas Final for the fourth time. In 2002, he had another spell at Belle Vue and at the age of 42 he again rejoined parent club Wolverhampton for the 2003 and 2004 season before spending his final season at Peterborough Panthers in 2005. In between, he won the 2003 Scottish Open, joining other Americans such as Wilbur Lamoreaux (1939), Greg Hancock (1991 and 1992) and Bobby Ott (1995) as a winner of the event.

Ermolenko retired in after the 2005 season where he rode or the Peterborough Panthers. In 2006, he staged a farewell meeting at Wolverhampton's Monmore Green Stadium.

== Since retirement ==
Ermolenko worked for Sky Sports in the United Kingdom as a trackside reporter and occasionally inside the studio. He also had a spell helping out the Reading Bulldogs off the track in 2006 when they finished runners-up in the Elite League. He is now tuning engines for riders as well his Sky TV work.

In 2023, Ermolenko was appointed the team manager of the Birmingham Brummies.

== Family ==
He is the older brother of Charles 'Dukie' Ermolenko who also rode in the United Kingdom.

== World Final Appearances ==
=== Individual World Championship ===
- 1985 - (England) Bradford, Odsal Stadium - 3rd - 13+1pts
- 1986 - (Poland) Chorzów, Silesian Stadium - 7th - 9pts
- 1987 - (Netherlands) Amsterdam, Olympic Stadium - 3rd - 24+2pts
- 1988 - (Denmark) Vojens, Speedway Center - 4th - 12pts
- 1991 - (Sweden) Gothenburg, Ullevi - 7th - 9pts
- 1992 - (Poland) Wrocław, Olympic Stadium - 8th - 7pts
- 1993 - (Germany) Pocking, Rottalstadion - Winner - 12pts
- 1994 - (Denmark) Vojens, Speedway Center - 13th - 6pts

=== Speedway Grand Prix results ===
| Year | Position | Points | Best Finish | Notes |
|---|---|---|---|---|
| 1995 | 3rd | 83 | 2nd | Second in Danish and British Grand Prix |
| 1996 | 9th | 52 | 4th | |

=== World Pairs Championship ===
- 1986 - (West Germany) Pocking, Rottalstadion (with Kelly Moran) - 2nd - 46+4pts (23)
- 1987 - (Czechoslovakia) Pardubice, Svítkov Stadion (with Kelly Moran) - 3rd - 36pts (18)
- 1988 - (England) Bradford, Odsal Stadium (with Shawn Moran) - 3rd - 39pts (16)
- 1992 - (Italy) Lonigo, Santa Marina Stadium (with Greg Hancock / Ronnie Correy) - Winner - 23+3pts (9)
- 1993 - (Denmark) Vojens, Speedway Center (with Ronnie Correy / Greg Hancock) - 2nd - 23pts (9)

=== World Team Cup ===
- 1985 - (United States) Long Beach, Veterans Memorial Stadium (with Shawn Moran / Bobby Schwartz / John Cook / Lance King) – 2nd – 35pts (3)
- 1986 - (Sweden) Gothenburg, Ullevi, (Denmark) Vojens, Speedway Center, (England) Bradford, Odsal Stadium (with Bobby Schwartz / Shawn Moran / Lance King / Rick Miller) - 2nd - 76pts (22)
- 1987 - (Denmark) Fredericia, Fredericia Speedway, (England) Coventry, Brandon Stadium (with Shawn Moran / Lance King / Rick Miller / Kelly Moran) - 3rd - 93pts (20)
- 1988 - (United States) Long Beach, Veterans Memorial Stadium (with Lance King / Shawn Moran / Kelly Moran / Rick Miller) - 2nd - 32pts (13)
- 1990 - (Czechoslovakia) Pardubice, Svítkov Stadion - Winner - 37pts (11)
- 1991 - (Denmark) Vojens, Vojens Speedway Center - 3rd - 28pts (9)
- 1992 - (Sweden) Kumla, Kumla Speedway - Winner - 39pts (10)
- 1993 - (England) Coventry, Brandon Stadium - Winner - 40pts (13)
- 1994 - (Germany) Brokstedt, Holsteinring Brokstedt - 5th - 17pts (12)
- 1995 - (Poland) Bydgoszcz, Polonia Bydgoszcz Stadium - 3rd - 19pts (9)
- 1998 - (Denmark) Vojens, Vojens Speedway Center - Winner - 28pts (0 - Reserve)
- 1999 - (Czechoslovakia) Pardubice, Svítkov Stadion - 3rd - 29pts (16)
- 2000 - (England) Coventry, Brandon Stadium - 3rd - 35pts (16)

=== World Longtrack Championship ===
- 1988 - (Germany) Scheeßel (11th) 13pts
