= Brandon Stadium =

Sports venue in Warwickshire, England

Brandon Stadium Coventry Stadium
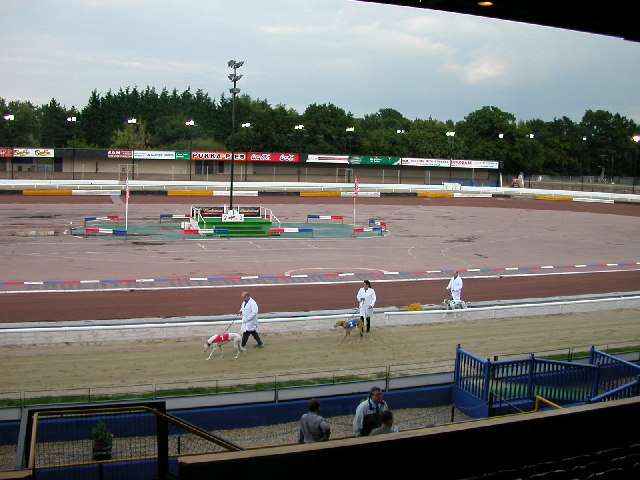
- The stadium in 2005
- Interactive map of Brandon Stadium; Coventry Stadium
- Location: Rugby Road, Brandon, Coventry; England
- Coordinates: 52°23′32″N 1°24′09″W
- Owner: Brandon Estates

Construction
- Opened: circa.1928
- Closed: 2023

Tenants
- Speedway; Stock Cars; Greyhound racing

Brandon Stadium, also known as Coventry Stadium, is located 6 miles east of Coventry in Brandon, Warwickshire, England. It was the home of the Coventry Bees motorcycle speedway team. It also hosted BriSCA F1 Stock Car Racing on the 1st Saturday of the month from April through to November. From 1978 until early 2016 it intermittently hosted greyhound racing. As of 2023, it is closed and has become dilapidated after several fires, including an arson attack in 2022.

== Speedway ==
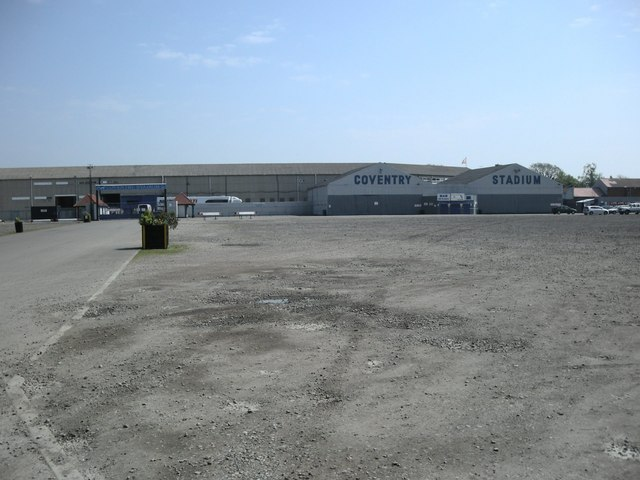
Outside view of the stadium in 2008

=== History ===
Brandon Stadium's first speedway meeting took place on 29 September 1928, hot on the heels of Coventry's first speedway venue at Lythalls Lane Stadium. Coventry were founder members of the National League from 1932 to 1933. The team were all set to return to action in 1934, but the Brandon proprietor C. W. East suddenly put the stadium up for sale. Despite challenge matches taking place during 1934 and 1936, league speedway would not return to Brandon for 15 years. Coventry was devastated during the war and after the war the stadium freehold was acquired by the Sanderson's (Allan and wife Hilda) and it was not until 1948 that speedway returned.

The track then ran under the company Midland Sports Stadiums (who also owned Leicester Speedway) and Charles Ochiltree promoted the Speedway and Stock Car Racing until his death in 1998. His son Martin then carried on promoting duties until the stadium was sold to Avtar Sandhu in 2003. The stadium's capacity is approximately 12,500. The record attendance for Brandon stands at 24,000, and was set during a speedway meeting, the Brandonapolis of 1954 on a Thursday night, where they locked the gates and were turning away buses.

The shale speedway track, which is inside the dog track is 301 metres (329 yards) in length while the greyhound track is 409 metres (447 yards) in length.

Brandon Stadium has been a popular stop for many high-profile speedway events in its lifetime. Under the old format of the Speedway World Championship events including the British Speedway Championship, the Commonwealth and Overseas finals as well as hosting the 1998, 1999 and 2000 Speedway Grand Prix of Great Britain. The 'Brandonapolis' was an annual event at which featured some of the world's best speedway riders. It was postponed in 2011, due to a dispute with the BSPA.

In 1991, Brandon Stadium staged the Under-21 World Championship final which was won by Denmark's Brian Andersen. The stadium also hosted the last Speedway World Team Cup Final in 2000 (won by Sweden) after having previously held the final in 1993 won by the United States.

=== Speedway World Finals ===
==== World Team Cup ====
- 1993 – United States (Sam Ermolenko / Billy Hamill / Greg Hancock / Josh Larsen / Bobby Ott) – 40pts
- 2000 – Sweden (Tony Rickardsson / Peter Karlsson / Henrik Gustafsson / Mikael Karlsson / Niklas Klingberg) – 40pts

==== Individual Under-21 World Championship ====
- 1991 – (Denmark) Brian Andersen – 14+3pts

=== Speedway Grand Prix ===
- 1998 Speedway Grand Prix of Great Britain – (Australia) Jason Crump
- 1999 Speedway Grand Prix of Great Britain – (Sweden) Tony Rickardsson
- 2000 Speedway Grand Prix of Great Britain – (England) Martin Dugard

== Sidecar speedway ==
Sidecar speedway was a regular feature at Brandon Stadium with both team and individual meetings taking place. The most prestigious meeting was the Gold Trophy, Sidecars World Cup in 2010 and the British Open Championship from 1996 to 1999.

=== Gold Trophy ===
- 1998 Gold Trophy – (Australia) Mick Headland & Jesse Headland

=== British Open Championship ===
- 1996 British Open Championship – (England) Roger Measor & Shane Lapham
- 1997 British Open Championship – (England) Roger Measor & Shane Lapham
- 1998 British Open Championship – (England) Paul Pinfold & Lisa Pinfold
- 1997 British Open Championship – (England) John Halsey & Jason Glenie

== Stock car racing ==
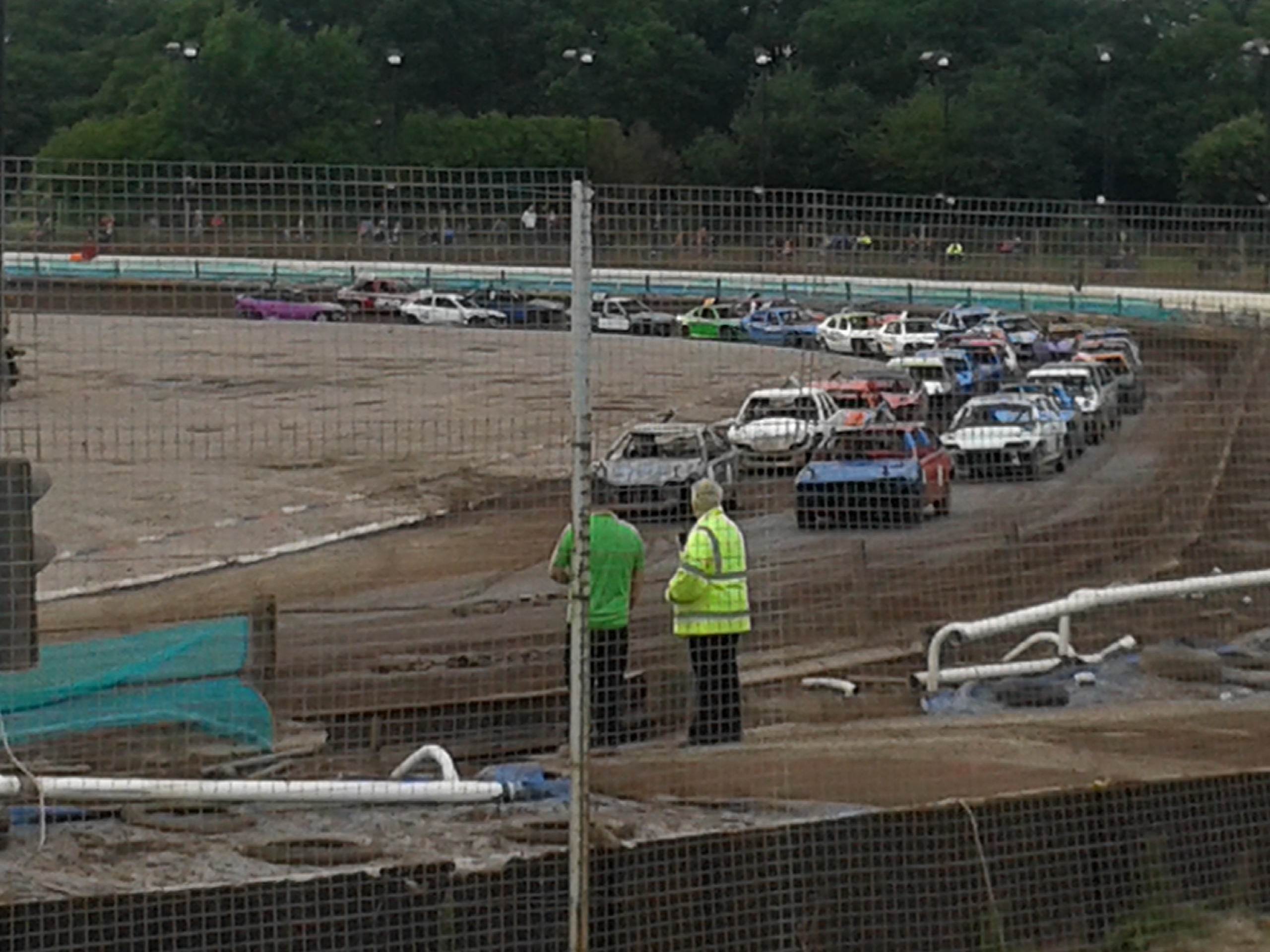
Banger racing at the stadium in 2014

The speedway track was also used for BriSCA F1 Stock Cars, having raced here continuously since 1954. The first meeting was held on 30 June, the first heat being won by Percy 'Hellcat' Brine, he also won the meeting Final. The BriSCA Formula 1 Stock Cars World Championship has been held here many times since 1960. The track was also used for BriSCA Formula 2 Stock Cars, V8 Hotstox, and various other forms of oval Motorsport including Bangers, Saloon Stock Cars, Ministox and Sprint Cars.

== Greyhound racing ==
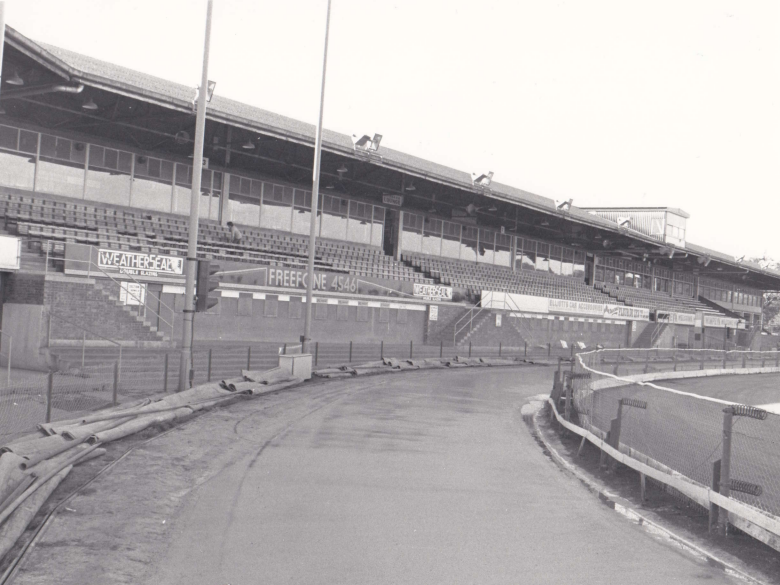
First bend of the greyhound track c. 1980

=== Origins ===
The Sanderson family had the majority shareholding in Midland Sports since the end of the war. Charles Ochiltree was installed as the Managing Director of Coventry Stadium Ltd at Brandon despite only having a minor shareholding in the company. Alan Sanderson died in November 1968 resulting in Ochiltree becoming the dominant decision maker for the track and fourteen years after the closure of Lythalls Lane Stadium greyhound racing returned to Coventry in 1978.

=== History ===
The racing arrived shortly after a failed Barratts Homes bid for sister track Leicester Stadium fuelling speculation that it was to be a replacement for Leicester. The first meeting took place on 19 September 1978 and facilities included a restaurant, a modern computerised tote and bars. The circuit was all sand and the hare was an 'Outside McGee' and Ron Day was installed as General Manager with Geoff Hammond as Racing Manager. A competition called the Eclipse returned to its traditional Coventry roots one year later.

Leading trainers Geoff DeMulder, Barbara Tompkins and Natalie Savva all became attached to the track and DeMulder went on to win the Trainer of the Year. During 1980 Iskagh Ruler (Tompkins) reached the English Greyhound Derby final. General Manager Ron Day died whilst in South Africa in 1981 and Sean Doyle (son of trainer Paddy Doyle) the young Racing Manager who had joined Coventry at the end of 1980 from Cradley Heath lost a battle with cancer. Mick Wheble the Racing Manager at sister track Leicester was brought in as Racing and Operations Manager. Barbara Tompkins won the 1983 English Greyhound Derby for Coventry when Im Slippy was victorious at White City Stadium.

==== First closure ====
Midland Sports finally sold sister track Leicester in 1984 to Barratts Homes and another Derby final appearance by a Tompkins trained runner (Murlens Slippy) was overshadowed by the imminent closure of the stadium to greyhound racing. It finished on 24 October 1986 but Ochiltree remained the Speedway promoter.

==== Re-Opening ====
Greyhounds returned in 2004, Simon Harris the Wimbledon Racing Manager was recruited at the end of 2003, the track was relaid in time for an April 2004 start. New kennels were built for the racing schedule of Wednesday, Friday and Saturday evening racing. The track received more good news when it was awarded the 2004 Trainers championship. Matt Dartnall trained two hounds through to the 2009 English Greyhound Derby final.

==== Subsequent closures and re-opening ====
After Boxing Day 2009 the company went into liquidation and closed. Just three years later the well-known professional gambler and owner Harry Findlay re-opened Coventry until 2014 when it shut once again. Independent racing (unaffiliated to a governing body) then took place until January 2016.

==== Track records ====
Extended content

Distance metres	Greyhound	Time	Date	Notes
260	Ballagarrow Jet	16.06	1979	
260	Echo Spark	15.87	28 January 1983	
263	Dynamo Joe	15.73	9 June 2012	
263	College Olympic	15.66	15 July 2012	
263	Southview Ace	15.66	15 May 2013	
280	Flywithoutwings	16.97	23 May 2004	
280	Cavecourt Jon	16.81	13 June 2004	
280	Ningbo Jack	16.80	11 July 2004	
280	Ningbo Jack	16.63	18 July 2004	
450	Many Are Called	27.02	29 May 2013	
460	Brainy Prince	28.23	1979	
460	Parkers Moon	28.20	29 May 1984	
480	Avon Towser	29.44	23 May 2004	
480	Avon Towser	29.30	6 June 2004	
480	Baltimore Joe	29.23	27 June 2004	Trainers Championship
480	Pitch Rocket	29.21	30 June 2004	
480	Droopys Shearer	28.89	18 July 2004	
480	Barnfield On Air	28.85	31 October 2007	
485	Fridays Shea	29.20	20 May 2012	
485	Holdem Spy	29.16	26 August 2012	
485	Castlebride Dan	29.15	9 December 2012	
485	Castlebride Dan	29.00	3 March 2013	
485	Farloe Warhawk	28.99	5 May 2013	
485	Calzaghe Davy	28.97	26 May 2013	
485	Sawpit Sensation	28.79	16 June 2013	
625	Well Tutored	38.96	23 December 2006	
625	Rough Domino	38.69	11 January 2009	
670	Solar Shamrock	42.54	1979	
670	Decoy Lassie	42.04	15 October 1982	
672	Blonde Fletch	41.44	22 July 2012	
672	Crinkill Jewel	41.32	5 August 2012	
672	Farloe Tango	41.15	18 August 2013	
680	Lear Princess	42.75	13 June 2004	
680	Maxie Rumble	42.71	20 June 2004	
680	Shelbourne Star	42.55	28 July 2004	
680	Tinrah Lad	42.48	29 January 2006	
680	Barnfield Brooke	42.47	23 December 2007	
859	Ballymac Swift	53.71	28 April 2013	
870	Eternal Mist	56.68	14 November 1978	
880	Shelbourne Maura	57.77	2 May 2004	
880	Gors Nikita	56.91	19 December 2004	
880	Dolly	56.97	14 January 2005	
880	Head Iton Jordan	56.75	23 April 2006	
880	Head Iton Jordan	56.62	14 May 2006	
880	Head Iton Jordan	56.53	22 July 2007	
894	Charleys Lucy	57.06	14 July 2012	
894	Dromana Becky	56.59	9 September 2012	
894	Tyrur Pudsy	56.66	24 February 2013	
1025	Slaneyside Demon	68.32	17 January 2007	
1080	Zuzu's Petal	70.77	23 December 2005	
485 H	Baran Bally Hi	29.95	3 March 2013	

== Since closure ==
In May 2022, the stadium caught fire, causing substantial damage to the grounds, with firefighters taking four hours to extinguish the fire. The cause was revealed as arson. Several months before the incident, an anonymous urban explorer had noted security concerns at the site that left it vulnerable to attack, and Brandon Estates had been previously accused of failing to keep the site secure.

On 12 May 2023, the owners Brandon Estates appealed against the decision of the local council refusing planning permission for 124 houses and a 3G football pitch on the site. In January 2024, Brandon Estates appeal for planning application to redevelop the site was dismissed by the Inspector.
