= Martin Dugard (speedway rider) =

British speedway rider

- Born: 18 May 1969 (age 57); Worthing, England
- Nationality: British (English)

Career history

Great Britain
- 1985–1987, 1993–2001: Eastbourne Eagles
- 1987: Cradley Heathens
- 1988–1992: Oxford Cheetahs

Sweden
- 1990: Dackarna
- 1992–1993: Elit Vetlanda

Individual honours
- 1993: Overseas Champion
- 1989: British Under-21 Champion
- 1986: Southern Riders' Championship

Team honours
- 1989, 1994, 2000: British Champions
- 1986, 1987: National League Winner
- 1985, 1986, 1987, 1994, 1997: National League KO Cup Winner

Martin Robert Dugard (born 18 May 1969 in Worthing, West Sussex) is a former English international motorcycle speedway rider, who spent much of his career with the Eastbourne Eagles and Oxford Cheetahs.

== Career ==
Dugard began riding for Eastbourne during the 1985 National League season as a 16-year-old and was one of the brightest prospects in the National league. He helped the Eagles win the Knockout Cup that year. In 1986, he averaged 9.75 and helped the Eagles win the league and cup double, in addition to winning the Southern Riders' Championship. Dugard considered the 1986 knockout cup as his favourite racing memory.

The following year in 1987, Dugard averaged 10.40 and won the league and cup double for a second time.

In 1988, Dugard moved into the British league to join one of Britain's top clubs at the time the Oxford Cheetahs, where he made an immediate impression with the fans and scored solidly. He soon became a heat leader for the Cheetahs and then an England international. He was British Under-21 Champion in 1989 and won the 1989 league title with Oxford. He made his world final debut a year later at Bradford's Odsal Stadium, scoring 6 points. During the 1990, 1991 and 1992 seasons, he was second in the Oxford averages behind Hans Nielsen.

Dugard returned to Eastbourne in 1993 and won the 1993 Overseas final to reach the semi finals of the 1993 Individual Speedway World Championship. For eight years straight he was from 1994 to 2001, Dugard was Eastbourne's leading rider and won the league title in 1995 and 2000 and two more Knockout Cups.

Dugard's greatest triumph was winning the 2000 Speedway Grand Prix of Great Britain as a Wild Card rider.

At retirement, Dugard had earned 41 international caps for the England national speedway team.

== Management ==
In 2015, Dugard become Chairman of Eastbourne Speedway club in the national league along with his older Son Connor Dugard who both ran the club on a day to day base.

== Family ==
Martin's father Bob Dugard and his son Kelsey Dugard were both speedway riders. Martin's partner Sarah (who died on Boxing Day 2021) was the mother of Tom Brennan.

== World Final Appearances ==
=== Individual World Championship ===
- 1990 – (England) Bradford, Odsal Stadium – 11th – 6pts
- 1992 – (Poland) Wrocław, Olympic Stadium – Reserve – did not ride

=== World Pairs Championship ===
- 1992 – (Italy) Lonigo, Santa Marina Stadium (with Gary Havelock / Kelvin Tatum) – 2nd – 23+2pts (0 – Reserve)
- 1993 – (Denmark) Vojens, Speedway Center (with Joe Screen / Gary Havelock) – 4th – 17pts (8)

=== World Team Cup ===
- 1991 – (Denmark) Vojens, Speedway Center – 4th – 11pts (4)
- 1992 – (Sweden) Kumla, Kumla Speedway – 3rd – 31pts (12)
- 1993 – (England) Coventry, Brandon Stadium – 4th – 14pts (1)
- 2000 – (England) Coventry, Brandon Stadium – 2nd – 40+0pts (4)

== Speedway Grand Prix results ==
Year	Position	Points	Best Finish	Notes
1998	32nd	2	21st	
2000	19th	25	Winner	Won British Grand Prix
2001	31st	4	17th	
