= Ronnie Correy =

American speedway rider

- Born: November 8, 1966 (age 60); Bellflower, California, USA
- Nationality: American

Career history

Great Britain
- 1987–1993, 1996–1997, 2000, 2005–2006: Wolverhampton Wolves
- 1995: Long Eaton Invaders
- 1998–1999, 2004: Belle Vue Aces
- 2007: Edinburgh Monarchs

Sweden
- 1990–1993, 1999–2000: Bysarna
- 2000: Indianerna

Poland
- 1992, 1997–1998: Leszno
- 1993: Rzeszów
- 1996: Tarnów
- 1999–2000: Łódź

Team honours
- 1992: World Team Cup Winner
- 1992: World Pairs Champion
- 1991: British League Champion
- 1996: Premier League Champion
- 1996: Premier League KO Cup winner
- 2000: Allsvenskan Winner

Ronnie Dean Correy (born November 8, 1966, in Bellflower, California) is an American former international motorcycle speedway rider. He was a World Pairs Champion, winning the title in 1992, a world cup winner and earned 23 caps for the United States national speedway team.

== Career summary ==
Correy first rode in the United Kingdom for the Wolverhampton Wolves in 1987. He remained at Wolves for sevens seasons before joining Long Eaton for one season in 1995.

Correy won the British League championship title in 1991 and one year later he won the World Pairs Championship with Greg Hancock.

Correy represented the US in the final of the 1989 Speedway World Team Cup at the Odsal Stadium in Bradford, England and the 1991 Speedway World Team Cup final in Vojens, Denmark before winning the 1992 Speedway World Team Cup.

Correy scored 4,127 points for Wolverhampton, recording 19 full maxima and 9 paid maxima and scored 366 bonus points with Wolves. He was the captain of the club before his release in 1998.

In 1998, Correy joined Belle Vue Aces and became the club captain for the 1999 season.

== World Final Appearances ==
=== Individual World Championship ===
- 1989 - (Germany) Munich, Olympic Stadium - 14th - 4pts
- 1990 - (England) Bradford, Odsal Stadium - 14th - 2pts
- 1991 - (Sweden) Gothenburg, Ullevi - 10th - 6pts
- 1992 - (Poland) Wrocław, Olympic Stadium - 12th - 5pts

=== World Team Cup ===
- 1989 - (England) Bradford, Odsal Stadium - 4th - 8pts (0) (11)
- 1991 - (Denmark) Vojens, Vojens Speedway Center - 3rd - 28pts (9)
- 1992 - (Sweden) Kumla, Kumla Speedway - Winner - 39pts (10)
