= 2000 Elite League speedway season =

British motorcycle speedway season

- League: Sky Sports Elite League
- Champions: Eastbourne Eagles
- Knockout Cup: King's Lynn Knights
- Craven Shield: Coventry Bees
- Riders Championship: Ryan Sullivan
- Highest average: Leigh Adams
- Division/s below: Premier League; Conference League

The 2000 Elite League speedway season was the 66th season of the top tier of speedway in the United Kingdom. It was the fourth known as the Elite League and was governed by the Speedway Control Board (SCB), in conjunction with the British Speedway Promoters' Association (BSPA).

== Season summary ==
In 2000, the league decreased to nine teams with the Hull Vikings dropping back down to the Premier League after just one season. The league operated on a standard format without play-offs.

Eastbourne Eagles claimed the millennium season league title but only finished two points clear of King's Lynn Knights. Martin Dugard topped scored for the Eagles but was well supported by their new signing Joe Screen from Hull Vikings. Three other English riders finished with averages in excess of 7 which was the crucial difference during the season. They were David Norris, Paul Hurry and Dean Barker. The King's Lynn Australian pairing of Leigh Adams and Jason Crump topped the league averages but did not have the back up that Eastbourne relied on. King's Lynn gained consolation when winning the Knockout Cup.

== Final table ==
Pos		M	W	D	L	F	A	Pts	Bon	Tot
1	Eastbourne Eagles	32	24	1	7	1544	1322	49	13	62
2	King's Lynn Knights	32	22	2	8	1564	1321	46	14	60
3	Ipswich Witches	32	16	3	13	1456	1409	35	11	46
4	Coventry Bees	32	16	3	13	1442	1427	35	8	43
5	Poole Pirates	32	14	4	14	1437	1426	32	8	40
6	Wolverhampton Wolves	32	15	3	14	1396	1467	33	6	39
7	Peterborough Panthers	32	11	2	19	1431	1425	24	7	31
8	Oxford Cheetahs	31	9	1	21	1296	1477	19	3	22
9	Belle Vue Aces	31	5	3	23	1248	1540	13	1	14

_{Oxford v Belle Vue not held.}

=== 'A' Fixtures ===
Home \ Away	BV	COV	EAS	IPS	KL	OX	PET	PP	WOL
Belle Vue Aces		52–38	37–53	44.5–45.5	44–46	40–50	47–43	40–50	41–49
Coventry Bees	52–38		50–40	45–45	48–42	55–34	52–26	40–50	45–44
Eastbourne Eagles	55–35	48–43		48–42	50–39	55–35	54–37	56–34	43–29
Ipswich Witches	52–38	47–43	47–43		45–45	52–38	50–40	51–40	53–37
King's Lynn Knights	62–28	56–34	49–41	47–43		49–40	51–42	53–37	49–41
Oxford Cheetahs	47–42	43–47	43–50	43–47	48–42		41–49	42–48	47–43
Peterborough Panthers	56.5–33.5	42–48	41–49	49–43	51–39	56–34		50–40	43–46
Poole Pirates	45–45	45–45	42–48	48–42	47–43	52–38	51–39		42–49
Wolverhampton Wolves	47–43	41–49	45–45	45–44	47–43	51–42	49–41	48–42	

Legend: Blue = home team win; Yellow = draw; Red = away team win.

=== 'B' Fixtures ===
Home \ Away	BV	COV	EAS	IPS	KL	OX	PET	PP	WOL
Belle Vue Aces		50–39	37–52	52–38	43–47	n/a	50–43	39–51	45–45
Coventry Bees	57–33		38–52	42–47	48–42	47–43	47–43	46–44	41–49
Eastbourne Eagles	60–30	49–40		51–39	50–42	54–36	48–42	53–37	50–40
Ipswich Witches	57–33	47–45	58–32		34–58	47–43	50–40	45–45	53–37
King's Lynn Knights	60–30	56–34	58–32	47–43		53–37	47–43	49–41	58–32
Oxford Cheetahs	46–44	43–47	46–44	46–44	42–48		41–49	41–29	44–46
Peterborough Panthers	50–40	45–45	44–46	45–45	45–45	59–31		42–48	57–33
Poole Pirates	60–30	45–48	46–44	50–39	41–49	45–45	50–39		48–42
Wolverhampton Wolves	45–45	44–46	41–49	51–39	40–50	43–47	49–41	46–44	

Legend: Blue = home team win; Yellow = draw; Red = away team win.

== Elite League Knockout Cup ==
The 2000 Speedway Star Knockout Cup was the 62nd edition of the Knockout Cup for tier one teams. King's Lynn Stars were the winners of the competition.

First round

Date	Team one	Score	Team two
12/05	Oxford	45-45	Poole
10/05	Poole	47-43	Oxford

Quarter-finals

Date	Team one	Score	Team two
04/09	Belle Vue	40-44	Coventry
02/08	King's Lynn	52-38	Ipswich
09/06	Peterborough	52-38	Poole
26/06	Wolverhampton	51-39	Eastbourne
24/06	Eastbourne	44-46	Wolverhampton
27/05	Coventry	49-41	Belle Vue
25/05	Ipswich	48-42	King's Lynn
10/05	Poole	47-43	Peterborough

Semi-finals

Date	Team one	Score	Team two
19/10	King's Lynn	63-27	Wolverhampton
18/10	Wolverhampton	43-47	King's Lynn
14/10	Coventry	47-43	Peterborough
13/10	Peterborough	47-43	Coventry
22/10 (replay)	Peterborough	46-44	Coventry
17/10 (replay)	Coventry	45-45	Peterborough

Final

First leg

25 October 2000

King's Lynn Knights Leigh Adams 14 Jason Crump 11 John Cook 11 Craig Boyce 8 Tom P. Madsen 6 Steve Masters 5 Travis McGowan 4	58 - 32	Coventry Bees Lee Richardson 11 Greg Hancock 10 Billy Hamill 9 Scott Robson 2 Shaun Tacey 0 Stuart Robson 0 John Jørgensen 0

King's Lynn Stadium

Second leg

31 October 2000

Coventry Bees Billy Hamill 11 Greg Hancock 10 Scott Robson 9 Lee Richardson 6 Shaun Tacey 6 Stuart Robson 6 John Jørgensen R/R	48 - 42	King's Lynn Knights Leigh Adams 11 Jason Crump 8 John Cook 9 Craig Boyce 7 Tom P. Madsen 3 Steve Masters 2 Travis McGowan 2

Brandon Stadium

King's Lynn Knights were declared Knockout Cup Champions, on aggregate score 100-80.

== Craven Shield ==
Anglia

Pos	Team	M	W	D	L	Pts
1	King's Lynn	4	3	0	1	6
2	Peterborough	4	1	1	2	3
3	Ipswich	4	1	1	2	3

Midland

Pos	Team	M	W	D	L	Pts
1	Coventry	3	2	0	1	4
2	Wolverhampton	3	2	0	1	4
3	Belle Vue	2	0	0	2	0

South

Pos	Team	M	W	D	L	Pts
1	Poole	4	2	1	1	5
2	Oxford	4	2	0	2	4
3	Eastbourne	4	1	1	2	3

Home \ Away	IPS	KL	PET
Ipswich		42–48	56–33
King's Lynn	54–36		52–38
Peterborough	45–45	47–43	

Legend: Blue = home team win; Yellow = draw; Red = away team win.

Home \ Away	BV	COV	WOL
Belle Vue		n–h	n–h
Coventry	51–39		43–47
Wolverhampton	49–41	41–49	

Legend: Blue = home team win; Yellow = draw; Red = away team win.

Home \ Away	EAS	OX	PP
Eastbourne		50–40	45–45
Oxford	49–41		46–44
Poole	52–38	47–43	

Legend: Blue = home team win; Yellow = draw; Red = away team win.

Final

Leg	Team one	Team two	Team three	Score
1	Poole	Coventry	King's Lynn	39–38–31
2	Coventry	King's Lynn	Poole	not staged
3	King's Lynn	Poole	Coventry	34–31–43

== Riders' Championship ==
Ryan Sullivan won the Elite League Riders' Championship, held at the Brandon Stadium on 21 October.

Pos.	Rider	Pts	Total	SF	Final
1	(Australia) Ryan Sullivan	1 3 3 3 2	12	x	3
2	(United States) Greg Hancock	3 3 2 2 2	12	x	2
3	(Denmark) Nicki Pedersen	2 3 0 3 1	9	3	1
4	(England) Scott Nicholls	0 2 3 3 2	10	2	0
5	(England) Chris Louis	0 1 2 3 3	9	1	
6	(Australia) Todd Wiltshire	3 3 0 2 1	9	0	
7	(England) Mark Loram	3 1 1 1 3	9		
8	(Australia) Jason Crump	2 2 0 2 3	9		
9	(United States) Billy Hamill	2 2 3 2 0	9		
10	(Sweden) Peter Karlsson	3 0 1 1 3	8		
11	(England) Paul Hurry	2 1 2 1 1	7		
12	(United States) Sam Ermolenko	1 0 3 1 1	6		
13	(Australia) Leigh Adams	1 1 1 0 2	5		
14	(Australia) Shane Parker	1 0 2 0 0	3		
15	(England) David Norris	1 0 2 0 0	3		
16	(England) Matt Cambridge (res)	0 0 0	0		
17	(England) Carl Downs (res)	0	0		

== Leading final averages ==
Rider	Team	Average
(Australia) Leigh Adams	Kings Lynn	10.17
(Australia) Jason Crump	Kings Lynn	10.15
(England) Mark Loram	Poole	10.10
(England) Martin Dugard	Eastbourne	9.67
(England) Chris Louis	Ipswich	9.57
(Poland) Tomasz Gollob	Ipswich	9.52
(Australia) Ryan Sullivan	Peterborough	9.18
(United States) Greg Hancock	Coventry	9.00
(England) Joe Screen	Eastbourne	8.82
(United States) Billy Hamill	Coventry	8.77

== Riders & final averages ==
Belle Vue

- (Australia) Jason Lyons 8.34
- (Sweden) Peter Nahlin 7.02
- (Denmark) Brian Karger 7.00
- (Finland) Kai Laukkanen 6.45
- (England) Andy Smith 6.20
- (Denmark) Jan Stæchmann 6.20
- (Denmark) Jesper Olsen 5.78
- (United States) Brent Werner 5.58
- (Denmark) John Jørgensen 5.37
- (Australia) Shane Parker 5.38
- (England) Glenn Cunningham 4.64
- (Australia) Kevin Doolan 3.76
- (Sweden) Daniel Andersson 2.20

Coventry

- (United States) Greg Hancock 9.00
- (United States) Billy Hamill 8.77
- (England) Lee Richardson 7.63
- (Czech Republic) George Štancl 5.35
- (England) Stuart Robson 5.34
- (Denmark) John Jørgensen 5.30
- (England) Shaun Tacey 5.26
- (England) Scott Robson 4.56

Eastbourne

- (England) Martin Dugard 9.67
- (England) Joe Screen 8.82
- (England) David Norris 7.73
- (England) Paul Hurry 7.34
- (Sweden) Stefan Dannö 7.20
- (England) Dean Barker 7.02
- (Finland) Petri Kokko 5.73
- (Australia) Brent Collyer 2.89

Ipswich

- (England) Chris Louis 9.57
- (Poland) Tomasz Gollob 9.52
- (Slovenia) Matej Ferjan 6.53
- (Czech Republic) Antonín Šváb Jr. 6.51
- (England) Jeremy Doncaster 6.13
- (New Zealand) Jason Bunyan 4.65
- (England) Savalas Clouting 4.15
- (England) Lawrence Hare 3.51
- (Denmark) Jan Andersen 3.46

King's Lynn

- (Australia) Leigh Adams 10.17
- (Australia) Jason Crump 10.15
- (Australia) Craig Boyce 7.98
- (United States) John Cook 6.86
- (Australia) Shane Parker 6.57
- (Australia) Travis McGowan 5.88
- (England) Steve Masters 4.40
- (Denmark) Tom P. Madsen 4.14

Oxford

- (Australia) Todd Wiltshire 8.24
- (Sweden) Jimmy Nilsen 7.97
- (Australia) Steve Johnston 7.36
- (Denmark) Brian Andersen 6.93
- (Denmark) Jan Stæchmann 5.49
- (Australia) Mark Lemon 5.27
- (Russia) Roman Povazhny 4.57
- (Czech Republic) Lukáš Dryml 4.54
- (Czech Republic) Aleš Dryml Jr. 4.26

Peterborough

- (Australia) Ryan Sullivan 9.18
- (Sweden) Peter Karlsson 8.69
- (Czech Republic) Zdeněk Tesař 6.85
- (Sweden) Stefan Andersson 6.84
- (Sweden) Magnus Zetterström 5.92
- (England) Glenn Cunningham 5.82
- (England) David Howe 5.67
- (Australia) Brett Woodifield 5.46
- (England) Andre Compton 4.50
- (Australia) Nigel Sadler 4.47

Poole

- (England) Mark Loram 10.10
- (England) Scott Nicholls 8.57
- (England) Gary Havelock 7.60
- (Norway) Lars Gunnestad 7.21
- (Australia) Craig Watson 5.17
- (England) Alun Rossiter 4.26
- (Sweden) Emil Lindqvist 3.41
- (England) Justin Elkins 1.28

Wolverhampton

- (Denmark) Jesper B. Jensen 8.32
- (United States) Sam Ermolenko 7.94
- (United States) Ronnie Correy 7.75
- (Denmark) Nicki Pedersen 7.48
- (Poland) Adam Skórnicki 5.79
- (Poland) Roman Povazhny 5.55
- (England) Wayne Carter 3.72

== See also ==
- List of United Kingdom Speedway League Champions
- Knockout Cup (speedway)
