= 1998 Premier League speedway season =

British motorcycle speedway season

- League: Premier League
- Champions: Peterborough Panthers
- Knockout Cup: Reading Racers
- Young Shield: Isle of Wight Islanders
- Individual: Glenn Cunningham
- Pairs: Peterborough Panthers
- Fours: Peterborough Panthers
- Highest average: Nicki Pedersen
- Division/s above: 1998 Elite League
- Division/s below: 1998 Conference League

The 1998 Premier League speedway season was the second division of speedway in the United Kingdom and governed by the Speedway Control Board (SCB), in conjunction with the British Speedway Promoters' Association (BSPA).

== Season summary ==
The League consisted of 13 teams for the 1998 season with the following the closure of the Long Eaton Invaders and the decision of the Oxford Cheetahs to compete in the Elite League. The addition of the Peterborough Panthers who dropped down from the Elite League limited the reduction in numbers.

The League was run on a standard format with no play-offs and was won by Peterborough.

== League ==
=== Final table ===
Pos		M	W	D	L	F	A	Pts	Bon	Tot
1	Peterborough Panthers	24	16	2	6	1206	945	34	12	46
2	Reading Racers	24	16	0	8	1130	989	32	10	42
3	Exeter Falcons	24	14	1	9	1134	1023	31	7	38
4	Hull Vikings	24	15	0	9	1098	1037	30	6	36
5	Sheffield Tigers	24	13	0	11	1088	1064	26	7	33
6	Isle of Wight Islanders	24	11	2	11	1095	1055	24	8	32
7	Glasgow Tigers	24	13	0	11	1085	1065	26	6	32
8	Newport Wasps	24	11	3	10	1067	1081	25	7	32
9	Edinburgh Monarchs	24	11	0	13	1078	1077	22	7	29
10	Newcastle Diamonds	24	10	3	11	1041	1109	23	3	26
11	Arena Essex Hammers	24	8	2	14	995	1139	18	2	20
12	Berwick Bandits	24	7	1	17	982	1173	15	2	17
13	Stoke Potters	24	3	0	21	956	1198	6	1	7

=== Fixtures and results ===
Home \ Away	AE	BER	ED	EX	GLA	HV	IOW	ND	NW	PET	RR	SHE	STO
Arena Essex Hammers		50–40	46–44	44–46	46–43	47–43	45–45	45–45	43–47	50–40	40–49	56–34	55–34
Berwick Bandits	46–43		47–43	39–51	44–46	43–46	37–53	45–45	52–38	48–42	41–49	44–46	48–42
Edinburgh Monarchs	49–41	39–51		53–35	56–34	56–33	54–36	49–41	61–29	43–47	45–44	47–43	50–40
Exeter Falcons	49–40	66–24	62–28		55–35	53–37	51–39	62–28	60–30	50–40	49–41	61–29	57–33
Glasgow Tigers	62–28	48–41	46–44	56–34		52–38	48–42	48–41	47–43	37–46	48–42	56–34	51–38
Hull Vikings	53–37	56–34	53–37	56–34	49–41		54–36	49–41	47–43	49–41	45–43	52–37	55–35
Isle of Wight Islanders	59–30	55–35	52–37	55–35	49–41	43–47		57–32	37–53	45–45	52–38	47–43	50–39
Newcastle Diamonds	53–37	42–47	47–43	55–35	46–44	45–44	51–39		45–45	47–42	40–50	39–48	49–40
Newport Wasps	43–46	61–28	50–40	45–45	53–37	54–36	49–35	38–51		45–45	52–38	56–33	48–41
Peterborough Panthers	58–32	60–30	56–34	62–28	47–43	51–39	55–35	58–32	68–22		54–36	50–39	61–29
Reading Racers	47–25	53–37	52–38	59–31	52–38	39–33	49–41	47–43	53–37	49–41		54–35	55–35
Sheffield Tigers	62–28	50–40	52–38	56–34	57–33	56–34	40–50	55–35	51–38	41–49	46–44		54–36
Stoke Potters	48.5–41.5	49–41	40–50	39–51	39–51	39–50	47–43	42–48	42–48	42–48	43–47	43–47	

Legend: Blue = home team win; Yellow = draw; Red = away team win.

== Premier League Knockout Cup ==
The 1998 Premier League Knockout Cup was the 31st edition of the Knockout Cup for tier two teams. Reading Racers were the winners of the competition.

Northern Group

Pos	Team	Played	W	D	L	Pts
1	Berwick Bandits	11	7	1	3	15
2	Sheffield Tigers	12	7	1	4	15
3	Glasgow Tigers	12	7	1	4	15
4	Edinburgh Monarchs	11	5	1	5	11
5	Newcastle Diamonds	9	3	2	4	8
6	Hull Vikings	12	4	0	8	8
7	Stoke Potters	8	3	0	6	6

Southern Group

Pos	Team	Played	W	D	L	Pts
1	Peterborough Panthers	10	7	0	3	14
2	Reading Racers	10	5	1	4	11
3	Arena Essex Hammers	10	5	0	5	10
4	Exeter Falcons	10	4	2	4	10
5	Isle of Wight Islanders	10	3	3	4	9
6	Newport Wasps	10	2	0	8	4

Semi-finals

Date	Team one	Score	Team two
20/07	Reading	56-34	Sheffield
16/07	Sheffield	45-45	Reading
14/08	Peterborough	56-34	Berwick
22/08	Berwick	42-48	Peterborough

Final

First leg

18 September 1998

Peterborough Panthers Philippe Bergé 10 Simon Stead 9 David Howe 8 Glenn Cunningham 5 Nigel Sadler 5 Brett Woodifield 4 Oliver Allen 3	44 – 46	Reading Racers Lee Richardson 14 Petri Kokko 12 Paul Clews 7 Dave Mullett 5 Jusin Elkins 5 Phil Morris 2 Krister Marsh 1

East of England Showground

Second leg

21 September 1998

Reading Racers Lee Richardson 18 Dave Mullett 10 Petri Kokko 10 Krister Marsh 8 Paul Clews 7 Jusin Elkins 4 Phil Morris R/R	57 – 33	Peterborough Panthers Leigh Lanham (guest) 11 Brett Woodifield 9 Philippe Bergé 5 Nigel Sadler 5 Ross Brady 3 Oliver Allen 0 David Howe 0

Smallmead Stadium

Reading were declared Knockout Cup Champions, winning on aggregate 103–77.

== Young Shield ==
- End of season competition for the top eight league teams

First Round

Team one	Team two	Score
Exeter	Isle of Wight	45–36, 22–49
Glasgow	Reading	49–41, 42–47
Hull	Sheffield	42–48, 45–45
Peterborough	Newport	48–40, 42–47

Semi-final

Team one	Team two	Score
Sheffield	Peterborough	51–39, 33–57
Glasgow	Isle of Wight	51–39, 31–58

Final

Team one	Team two	Score
Peterborough	Isle of Wight	50–40, 37–53

== Riders' Championship ==
Glenn Cunningham won the Riders' Championship. The final was held on 13 September at Owlerton Stadium.

Pos.	Rider	Pts	Total	SF	Final
1	(England) Glenn Cunningham	2 2 3 3 3	13	-	3
2	(England) Carl Stonehewer	3 3 2 1 3	12	2	2
3	(England) Peter Carr	3 3 2 3 3	14	-	1
4	(Denmark) Nicki Pedersen	2 2 3 2 2	12	3	0
5	(Australia) Craig Watson	1 3 2 2 2	11	1	
6	(England) Leigh Lanham	0 3 0 3 3	10	0	
7	(England) Paul Bentley	1 0 3 2 2	9		
8	(England) Paul Pickering	1 1 2 3 0	8		
9	(Australia) Frank Smart	2 1 1 1 2	7		
10	(England) Scott Smith	0 2 3 0 1	7		
11	(England) Lee Richardson	3 2 1 0 r	6		
12	(England) David Walsh	0 0 1 2 1	6		
13	(England) Paul Thorp	3 r	3		
14	(England) Martin Dixon	2 0 1 0	3		
15	(England) Steve Masters	1 1 0 t 1	3		
16	(England) Derrol Keats	0 0 1 1 1	3		
17	(Australia) Mick Powell	0 1	1		

- f=fell, r-retired, ex=excluded, ef=engine failure t=touched tapes

== Pairs ==
The Premier League Pairs Championship was held at Hayley Stadium on 26 July. The event was won by Peterborough Panthers.

Group A
Pos	Team	Pts	Riders
1	Exeter	18	Coles 11, Smart 7
2	Reading	17	Mullett 9, Kokko 8
3	Arena Essex	12	Pedersen 10, Lanham 2
4	Edinburgh	7	Carr P 4, McKinna 3

Group B
Pos	Team	Pts	Riders
1	Peterborough	21	Cunningham 12, Woodifield 9
2	Newcastle	16	Pedersen 12, Olsen 4
3	Newport	12	Watson 9, Fry 3
4	Hull	7	Bentley 7, Lobb 0

Semi finals

- Peterborough bt Reading 5–4
- Exeter bt Newcastle 6–3

Final

- Peterborough bt Exeter 5–4

== Fours ==
Peterborough Panthers won the Premier League Four-Team Championship, which was held on 30 August 1998, at the East of England Arena.

Group A
Pos	Team	Pts	Riders
1	Peterborough	17	Berge 6, Cunningham 4, Woodifield 4 Sadler 5
2	Hull	14	Grahame 5, Bentley 3, Dicken 3, Thorp 3
3	Newport	11	Fry 3, Henriksson 3, Watson 3, Pegler 2
4	Newcastle	6	Werner 4, Birkenshaw 1, Olsen 1, Swales 0

Group B
Pos	Team	Pts	Riders
1	Reading	16	Richardson 6, Kokko 5, Clews 4, Mullett 1
2	Edinburgh	12	McKinna K 6
3	Arena Essex	11	Lanham 5
4	Exeter	9	Coles 4 Smart 2

Final
Pos	Team	Pts	Riders
1	Peterborough	24	Cunningham 8, Berge 6 Woodifield 5 Sadler 5
2	Hull	19	Thorp 7, Grahame 5, Bentley 4, Dicken 3,
3	Edinburgh	19	Carr P 8, McKinna 6, Little 4, Andersson 1
4	Reading	10	Richardson 4, Kokko 4, Clews 2, Elkins 0, Mullett 0

== Leading averages ==
Rider	Team	Average
(Denmark) Nicki Pedersen	Newcastle	9.97
(England) Carl Stonehewer	Sheffield	9.93
(England) Lee Richardson	Reading	9.60
(England) Paul Thorp	Hull	9.56
(England) Glenn Cunningham	Peterborough	9.55
(England) Dave Mullett	Reading	9.48
(Finland) Petri Kokko	Reading	9.36
(Australia) Mick Powell	Glasgow	9.32
(Denmark) Jan Andersen	Peterborough	9.29
(England) Peter Carr	Edinburgh	9.26

== Riders & final averages ==
Arena Essex

- Leigh Lanham 9.03
- Jan Pedersen 8.71
- Colin White 7.90
- Troy Pratt 6.96
- David Mason 4.69
- Matt Read 4.00
- Paul Lydes-Uings 2.60
- Nathan Morton 2.52
- Anthony Barlow 2.27
- Oliver Allen 2.26
- Gavin Hedge 2.07

Berwick

- Rene Madsen 8.45
- Scott Lamb 8.22
- James Grieves 8.00
- David Walsh 7.47
- Peter Scully 6.77
- Jörg Pingel 6.46
- Scott Robson 6.45
- Martin Dixon 6.31
- David Meldrum 5.25
- Craig Taylor 4.68
- David McAllan 2.99
- Wesley Waite 2.74

Edinburgh

- Peter Carr 9.26
- Kenny McKinna 8.66
- Kevin Little 7.95
- Marcus Andersson 5.63
- Robert Larsen 5.49
- Barry Campbell 5.33
- Paul Gould 4.76
- Blair Scott 4.37

Exeter

- Frank Smart 9.03
- Michael Coles 8.38
- Peter Jeffery 7.90
- Mark Simmonds 7.71
- Graeme Gordon 6.54
- Roger Lobb 4.83
- Gary Lobb 4.31
- Paul Oughton 4.26
- Chris Courage 2.43

Glasgow

- Mick Powell 9.32
- Kaj Laukkanen 8.93
- David Steen 7.53
- Grant MacDonald 6.67
- Daniel Andersson 6.17
- Sean Courtney 5.68
- Will Beveridge 5.56
- Brian Turner 4.81

Hull

- Paul Thorp 9.56
- Paul Bentley 8.93
- Alan Grahame 6.67
- Lee Dicken 6.54
- Paul Lee 5.28
- John Wilson 4.69
- Simon Cartwright 2.92

Isle of Wight

- Ray Morton 8.40
- Philippe Berge 8.29
- Steve Masters 8.21
- Jason Bunyan 7.21
- Neville Tatum 7.15
- Scott Swain 7.14
- Wayne Carter 6.59
- Danny Bird 3.60
- Anthony Barlow 3.59

Newcastle

- Nicki Pedersen 9.97
- Brent Werner 8.26
- Jesper Olsen 8.17
- Stuart Swales 6.96
- James Birkinshaw 3.77
- Jonathan Swales 3.13
- David McAllan 2.84
- Malcolm Hogg 0.95

Newport

- Craig Watson 8.36
- Paul Fry 8.00
- Anders Henriksson 7.52
- Scott Pegler 5.82
- Martin Willis 4.93
- David Mason 4.60
- Jon Armstrong 3.40
- Chris Neath 3.29

Peterborough

- Glenn Cunningham 9.55
- Jan Andersen 9.29
- Nigel Sadler 8.20
- Philippe Bergé 7.83
- David Howe 7.79
- Brett Woodifield 7.01
- Simon Stead 5.46
- Paul Clews 4.84
- Oliver Allen 4.04
- Ross Brady 1.90

Reading

- Lee Richardson 9.60
- Dave Mullett 9.48
- Petri Kokko 9.36
- Phil Morris 5.15
- Krister Marsh 4.67
- Justin Elkins 4.61
- Paul Clews 4.04
- Lee Driver 2.70

Sheffield

- Carl Stonehewer 9.93
- Scott Smith 7.23
- Rene Aas 6.65
- Andre Compton 6.44
- Steve Knott 5.58
- Tommy Palmer 5.13
- Derrol Keats 5.10

Stoke

- Paul Pickering 9.00
- Neil Collins 7.37
- Mark Burrows 5.78
- Craig Taylor 5.03
- Stewart McDonald 4.63
- Dean Felton 4.39
- Rob Clarence 2.07

== See also ==
- List of United Kingdom Speedway League Champions
- Knockout Cup (speedway)
