= 1997 Premier League speedway season =

British motorcycle speedway season

- League: Premier League
- Champions: Reading Racers
- Knockout Cup: Edinburgh Monarchs
- Young Shield: Exeter Falcons
- Individual: Peter Carr
- Pairs: Long Eaton Invaders
- Fours: Long Eaton Invaders
- Highest average: Dave Mullett
- Division/s above: 1997 Elite League
- Division/s below: 1997 Conference League

The 1997 Premier League speedway season was the second division of motorcycle speedway in the United Kingdom and governed by the Speedway Control Board (SCB), in conjunction with the British Speedway Promoters' Association (BSPA).

== Restructure ==
A restructure of British speedway took place, with the Premier League becoming the second division and a new Elite League becoming the top division. During the two previous seasons (1995 and 1996) there had been only one division of British speedway also called the Premier League, this confused matters because the Premier League was now only a second-tier competition.

== Season summary ==
The Premier League was consisted of 14 teams for the 1997 season, running on a standard format with no play-offs. The Young Shield was introduced as an end of season cup competition for the top eight teams in the league standings.

A new team Skegness Braves, created by Peter Oakes, entered speedway for the first time but withdrew mid-season.

Reading Racers won the title.

== Final table ==
Pos		M	W	D	L	F	A	Pts	Bon	Tot
1	Reading Racers	26	22	0	4	1323	1011	44	13	57
2	Long Eaton Invaders	26	18	1	7	1227	1107	37	11	48
3	Edinburgh Monarchs	26	17	1	8	1235	1102	38	8	43
4	Newcastle Diamonds	26	15	0	11	1201	1134	30	8	38
5	Exeter Falcons	26	14	0	12	1213	1125	28	6	34
6	Glasgow Tigers	26	12	2	10	1158	1179	26	6	32
7	Arena Essex Hammers	26	12	0	14	1157	1179	24	7	31
8	Isle of Wight Islanders*	26	12	0	14	1149	1184	24	7	31
9	Hull Vikings	26	13	0	13	1134	1195	26	5	31
10	Sheffield Tigers	26	12	0	14	1116	1219	24	5	29
11	Oxford Cheetahs	26	9	0	17	1116	1219	18	6	24
12	Stoke Potters	26	8	2	16	1111	1122	18	3	21
13	Berwick Bandits	26	7	1	18	1105	1223	15	4	19
14	Newport Wasps	26	7	1	18	1095	1241	15	2	17

- replaced Skegness Braves mid-season

== Fixtures & results ==
Home \ Away	AE	BER	ED	EX	GLA	HV	IOW	LE	ND	NW	OX	RR	SHE	STO
Arena Essex Hammers		53–36	40–49	55–35	57–33	49–41	54–36	43–47	48–42	51–38	48–42	39–51	60–30	44–46
Berwick Bandits	43–47		50–40	43–47	45–45	43–47	42–48+	41–49	54–35	59–31	48–42	37–53	50–39	56–34
Edinburgh Monarchs	54–36	46–44		54–36	53–37	59–31	53–36+	45–45	44–4	55–35	58–32	46–44	64–26	48–42
Exeter Falcons	53–37	51–39	52–38		72–18	55–34	57–33	65–25	54–36	61–29	55–35	39–51	49–41	50–40
Glasgow Tigers	50–40	48–41	44–46	55–35		51–39	55–35	42–48	53–37	52–38	64–26	49–41	52–38	52–38
Hull Vikings	48–42	55–32	46–44	60–30	53–36		51–39	50–40	44–46	48–42	49–41	41–49	53–37	42–48
Isle of Wight Islanders	59–30	49–40	53–36	57–33	47–43	58–32		41–49	51–39	38–52	52–38	59–29	43–47	53–37
Long Eaton Invaders	53–37	51–39	59–31	50–40	52–37	57–32	50–40		52–38	52–37	51–38	46–44	55–35	46–44
Newcastle Diamonds	55–35	48–42	48–42	56–34	50–40	53–37	57–33	52–38		53–37	49–41	41–48	60–30	42–47
Newport Wasps	43–47	39–50	39–51	50–40	48–42	43–46	57–33	51–39	43–47		50–40	41–49	49–41	45–45
Oxford Cheetahs	56–34	55–34	44–46	54–36	40–50	53–37	41–49	46–43	50–39	52–38		43–47	52–38	51–38
Reading Racers	49–41	64–26	50–40	54–36	62–28	48–40	61–29	55–35	52–38	52–38	54–36		59–31	61–29
Sheffield Tigers	48–42	62–18	44–46	49–40	53–37	43–46	50–40	47–42	48–41	46–44	50–40	44–46		49–41
Stoke Potters	42–48	45–43	43–47	32–58	45–45	57–32	51–38	37–53	37–53	52–38	62–28	39–50	40–50	

Source: + as Skegness
Legend: Blue = home team win; Yellow = draw; Red = away team win.

== Premier League Knockout Cup ==
The 1997 Premier League Knockout Cup was the 30th edition of the Knockout Cup for tier two teams and the first with the name Premier League Knockout Cup. Edinburgh Monarchs were the winners of the competition.

During 1995 and 1996 the British League merged and ran as one newly named Premier League, which therefore meant that the second tier of speedway in the United Kingdom was the 1995 Academy League season, followed one year later by the 1996 Speedway Conference League season.

First round

Northern Group

Pos	Team	Played	W	D	L	Pts
1	Hull Vikings	11	7	1	3	15
2	Edinburgh Monarchs	12	6	1	5	13
3	Newcastle Diamonds	12	6	1	5	13
4	Sheffield Tigers	12	6	0	6	12
5	Berwick Bandits	12	5	1	6	11
6	Stoke Potters	11	5	0	6	10
7	Glasgow Tigers	12	4	0	8	8

Southern Group

Pos	Team	Played	W	D	L	Pts
1	Oxford Cheetahs	10	6	3	1	15
2	Reading Racers	10	7	1	2	15
3	Long Eaton Invaders	10	6	2	2	14
4	Arena Essex Hammers	10	4	2	4	10
5	Exeter Falcons	10	2	0	8	4
6	Skegness Braves	10	1	0	9	2

Semi-finals

Date	Team one	Score	Team two
04/07	Edinburgh	51-39	Reading
21/07	Reading	48-42	Edinburgh
29/06	Oxford	51-39	Hull
09/07	Hull	46-43	Oxford

=== Final ===
First leg

29 August 1997

Oxford Cheetahs Neville Tatum 13 Philippe Bergé 11 Lawrence Hare 11 Mikael Teurnberg 6 Jeremy Luckhurst 2 Anthony Barlow 0 Darren Andrews R/R	43 – 47	Edinburgh Monarchs Peter Carr 12 Robert Eriksson 10 Kenny McKinna 10 Paul Gould 7 Blair Scott 6 Barry Campbell 2 Neil Hewitt 0

Oxford Stadium

Second leg

30 August 1997

Edinburgh Monarchs Kenny McKinna 13 Peter Carr 12 Robert Eriksson 11 Blair Scott 5 Paul Gould 3 Barry Campbell 3 Neil Hewitt R/R	47 – 43	Oxford Cheetahs Philippe Bergé 15 Neville Tatum 12 Lawrence Hare 8 Mikael Teurnberg 4 William Beveridge 4 Anthony Barlow 0 Jeremy Luckhurst R/R

Armadale Stadium

Edinburgh were declared Knockout Cup Champions, winning on aggregate 94–86.

== Young Shield ==
- End of season competition for the top eight league teams

First Round

Team one	Team two	Score
Edinburgh	Glasgow	49–40, 48–42
Newcastle	Exeter	46–44, 22–68
Reading	Isle of Wight	60–30, 53–37
Arena Essex	Long Eaton	45–44, 42–48

Semi-final

Team one	Team two	Score
Reading	Exeter	47–43, 37–53
Long Eaton	Edinburgh	55–35, 42–48

Final

Team one	Team two	Score
Long Eaton	Exeter	51–39, 32–57

== Riders' Championship ==
Peter Carr won the Riders' Championship. The final was held on 13 September at Brandon Stadium.

Pos.	Rider	Pts	Total	SF	Final
1	(England) Peter Carr	2 2 0 2 3	9	3	3
2	(England) Glenn Cunningham	0 2 3 3 2	10	2	2
3	(Sweden) Robert Eriksson	2 2 3 2 r	9	2	1
4	(Australia) Brett Woodifield	3 1 3 1 3	11	3	0
5	(England) Dave Mullett	1 3 3 3 2	12	1	
6	(England) Neville Tatum	3 3 2 3 1	12	1	
7	(England) Leigh Lanham	3 3 fex 2 1	9	0	
8	(England) Stuart Robson	1 1 1 3 3	9	0	
9	(Scotland) Scott Lamb	2 1 2 1 3	9		
10	(England) Carl Stonehewer	3 1 1 1 2	8		
11	(England) Les Collins	1 3 1 0 2	7		
12	(England) Scott Smith	0 0 2 2 1	5		
13	(England) Neil Collins	2 0 2 0 0	4		
14	(England) Troy Pratt	0 2 1 0 0	3		
15	(England) Paul Bentley	1 0 0 1 1	3		
16	(Sweden) Anders Henriksson	0 fex - - -	0		
17	(England) David Housley (res)	- 0 - 0	0		
18	(England) Nick Simmons (res)	- - 0 -	0		

- f=fell, r-retired, ex=excluded, ef=engine failure t=touched tapes

== Pairs ==
The Premier League Pairs Championship was held at Oxford Stadium on 26 September. The event was won by Long Eaton Invaders.

Pos	Team	Pts	Riders
1	Long Eaton	33	Stonehewer 18, Dixon 15
2	Reading	31	Richardson 19, Mullett 12
3	Exeter	28	Coles 21, Lanham 7
4	Oxford	26	Hare 20, Tatum 6
5	Sheffield	26	Kessler 18, Smith 8
6	Glasgow	23	Powell 13, Collins 10
7	Edinburgh	22	Carr P 17, McKinna 5

== Fours ==
Long Eaton Invaders won the Premier League Four-Team Championship, which was held on 3 August 1997, at the East of England Arena.

Final
Pos	Team	Pts	Riders
1	Long Eaton	28	Lee 7, Stonehewer 7, Werner 7, Dixon 6, Elkins 1
2	Edinburgh	23	Carr P 12, Eriksson 6, McKinna K 4, Gould 1
3	Oxford	17	Hare 6, Teurnberg 4, Berge 4, Tatum 3
4	Berwick	9	Lamb 4, Little 2, Pingel 1, Kosonen 1, Meldrum 1

== Final leading averages ==
Rider	Team	Average
(England) Dave Mullett	Reading	10.47
(England) Carl Stonehewer	Long Eaton	10.39
(England) Glenn Cunningham	Reading	9.92
(England) Peter Carr	Edinburgh	9.88
(England) Martin Dixon	Long Eaton	9.81
(Scotland) Kenny McKinna	Edinburgh	9.73
(Germany) Robbie Kessler	Sheffield	9.76
(England) Alan Grahame	Hull	9.75
(Sweden) Robert Eriksson	Edinburgh	9.46
(England) Les Collins	Stoke	9.44

== Riders and final averages ==
Arena Essex

- Troy Pratt 8.65
- Jan Pedersen 8.42
- Colin White 7.22
- Tommy Palmer 7.08
- David Mason 4.07
- John Wainwright 4.00
- Paul Lydes-Uings 2.44

Berwick

- Scott Lamb 8.57
- Jörg Pingel 7.21
- Kevin Little 7.18
- Mike Smith 6.65
- Richard Juul 6.54
- David Meldrum 4.97
- David Blackburn 4.54
- Michael Lowrie 3.91

Edinburgh

- Peter Carr 9.88
- Kenny McKinna 9.73
- Robert Eriksson 9.46
- Jarno Kosonen 6.63
- Paul Gould 4.45
- Barry Campbell 3.85
- Blair Scott 3.68
- Neil Hewitt 2.35

Exeter

- Michael Coles 8.83
- Leigh Lanham 8.76
- Frank Smart 7.28
- Peter Jeffery 7.14
- Graeme Gordon 6.18
- Gary Lobb 3.52
- Paul Fudge 2.86

Glasgow

- Neil Collins 9.02
- Mick Powell 8.32
- Stewart McDonald 7.47
- Sean Courtney 6.91
- Will Beveridge 4.44
- Grant MacDonald 3.28

Hull

- Alan Grahame 9.75
- Stuart Robson 8.37
- Scott Robson 7.55
- Peter Scully 6.49
- Lee Dicken 5.01
- Brian Turner 2.91
- Richard Emson 1.95

Isle of Wight/Skegness

- Shaun Tacey 8.23
- Brett Woodifield 7.63
- Nigel Sadler 6.73
- Mark Simmonds 6.44
- Wayne Carter 6.20
- Jason Bunyan 5.71
- Paul Clews 3.75
- Gavin Hedge 2.70
- Lee Dixon 1.14

Long Eaton

- Carl Stonehewer 10.39
- Martin Dixon 9.81
- Brent Werner 9.27
- Justin Elkins 5.06
- Paul Lee 4.21
- Mark Burrows 4.00
- Dean Felton 2.39
- Bobby Eldridge 2.18

Newcastle

- Paul Bentley 8.81
- Jesper Olsen 8.57
- Richard Juul 7.73
- Stuart Swales 7.13
- Glyn Taylor 5.92
- Andre Compton 3.80
- Brian Turner 3.78
- James Birkinshaw 2.00

Newport

- Paul Fry 8.75
- Anders Henriksson 8.24
- Craig Watson 7.72
- Scott Pegler 6.12
- Martin Willis 4.14
- Roger Lobb 3.55

Oxford

- Neville Tatum 9.14
- Lawrence Hare 8.46
- Philippe Bergé 8.35
- Mikael Teurnberg 7.34
- Jason Bunyan 4.41
- Jeremy Luckhurst 3.37
- Krister Marsh 2.67
- Anthony Barlow 2.27
- Darren Andrews 1.37

Reading

- Dave Mullett 10.47
- Glenn Cunningham 9.92
- David Steen 7.75
- Lee Richardson 6.73
- Paul Pickering 6.50
- Krister Marsh 2.43
- Bobby Eldridge 2.00

Sheffield

- Robbie Kessler 9.76
- Scott Smith 8.95
- Mirko Wolter 7.94
- Rene Aas 6.89
- Steve Knott 5.45
- Peter Boast 3.70
- Derrol Keats 3.33
- Mike Hampson 3.10
- James Birkinshaw 3.02

Stoke

- Les Collins 9.44
- Phil Morris 6.53
- Craig Taylor 6.17
- Chris Cobby 5.87
- Tony Atkin 5.83
- Mark Burrows 4.42

Jon Armstrong 2.00

== See also ==
- List of United Kingdom Speedway League Champions
- Knockout Cup (speedway)
