= 1999 Elite League speedway season =

65th season of the British motorcycle speedway tier 1 league

- League: Sky Sports Elite League
- Champions: Peterborough Panthers
- Knockout Cup: Peterborough Panthers
- Craven Shield: Peterborough Panthers
- Riders Championship: Jason Crump
- Highest average: Jason Crump
- Division/s below: Premier League; Conference League

The 1999 Elite League speedway season was the 65th season of the top tier of motorcycle speedway in the United Kingdom. It was the third known as the Elite League and was governed by the Speedway Control Board (SCB), in conjunction with the British Speedway Promoters' Association (BSPA).

== Season summary ==
In 2000, the league increased to ten teams with the Hull Vikings and the Peterborough Panthers moving up from the Premier League, and the Swindon Robins dropping down. The league operated on a standard format without play-offs.

Despite coming up a division Peterborough completely rebuilt their team for the season. They brought in three Australians Jason Crump from Oxford Cheetahs, Ryan Sullivan from Poole Pirates and Craig Watson from Newport Wasps, in addition to recalling Zdeněk Tesař. Poole ran Peterborough close, only losing the league by one point and losing in the cup final to them.

== Final table ==
Pos		M	W	D	L	F	A	Pts	Bon	Tot
1	Peterborough Panthers	18	12	2	4	889	734	26	8	34
2	Poole Pirates	18	12	0	6	899	724	24	9	33
3	King's Lynn Knights	18	11	1	6	823	804	23	6	29
4	Coventry Bees	18	11	1	6	821	804	23	5	28
5	Ipswich Witches	18	11	0	7	815	710	22	4	26
6	Belle Vue Aces	18	9	1	8	848	773	19	5	24
7	Hull Vikings	18	6	1	11	785	834	13	3	16
8	Oxford Cheetahs	18	5	0	13	754	869	10	3	13
9	Eastbourne Eagles	18	5	1	12	745	879	12	1	13
10	Wolverhampton Wolves	18	4	0	14	736	884	8	1	9

=== Fixtures and results ===
Home \ Away	BV	COV	EAS	HV	IPS	KL	OX	PET	PP	WOL
Belle Vue Aces		44–45	58–32	56–33	55–35	48–42	57–35	53–37	46–44	60–30
Coventry Bees	45–45		49–41	49–41	42–48	44–46	51–39	47–44	49–41	48–42
Eastbourne Eagles	37–53	47–44		48–42	44–46	47–43	55–35	43–47	44–46	50–40
Hull Vikings	47–43	39–50	53–37		52–38	45–47	49–40	45–45	53–36	61–29
Ipswich Witches	46–44	46–47	58–32	51–39		46–44	48–41	48–42	50–43	51–39
King's Lynn Knights	54–36	57–33	55–35	47–43	48–45		47–43	45–45	48–44	43–47
Oxford Cheetahs	46–44	39–51	46–47	56–34	47–43	48–42		42–48	39–51	57–34
Peterborough Panthers	60–30	48–44	52–38	59–32	55–34	56–34	60–30		48–42	59–31
Poole Pirates	58–33	53–37	54–36	57–33	53–36	61–28	61–29	54–36		51–39
Wolverhampton Wolves	47–43	44–46	58–32	46–44	43–46	44–45	47–42	42–48	40–50	

Legend: Blue = home team win; Yellow = draw; Red = away team win.

== Elite League Knockout Cup ==
The 1999 Speedway Star Knockout Cup was the 61st edition of the Knockout Cup for tier one teams. Peterborough Panthers were the winners of the competition.

First round

Date	Team one	Score	Team two
26/06	Eastbourne	47-43	Ipswich
17/06	Ipswich	51-39	Eastbourne
28/05	Belle Vue	53-37	Kings Lynn
26/05	Kings Lynn	55-35	Belle Vue

Second round

Date	Team one	Score	Team two
08/10	Peterborough	56-34	Ipswich
03/09	Poole	59-31	Kings Lynn
02/09	Ipswich	44-46	Peterborough
13/08	Kings Lynn	46-44	Poole
12/07	Reading	46-44	Sheffield
30/06	Hull	49-41	Wolverhampton
28/06	Wolverhampton	48-42	Hull
19/06	Coventry	51-39	Oxford

Semi-finals

Date	Team one	Score	Team two
15/10	Peterborough	50-40	Hull
13/10	Hull	47-42	Peterborough
13/10	Poole	49-41	Coventry
09/10	Coventry	40-49	Poole

Final The second leg of the final was due to be completed on 22 October but was abandoned after just two heats due to heavy rain.

First leg

20 October 1999

Poole Pirates Matej Ferjan 13	49 - 41	Peterborough Panthers Jason Crump 13

Wimborne Road

Second leg

28 October 1999

Peterborough Panthers Jason Crump 15 Ryan Sullivan 11 Zdeněk Tesař 8 Nigel Sadler 6 Jan Andersen 5 Marián Jirout 4 David Howe 2	51 - 39	Poole Pirates Lee Richardson 13 Mark Loram 11 Gary Havelock 7 Bohumil Brhel (guest) 6 Oliver Allen 2 Matej Ferjan 0 Magnus Zetterström R/R

East of England Showground

Peterborough Panthers were declared Knockout Cup Champions, winning on aggregate 92-88.

== Craven Shield ==
Pos		M	W	D	L	Tot
1	Oxford	17	13	1	3	27
2	Coventry	18	12	0	6	24
3	Peterborough	18	10	2	6	22
4	Poole	18	8	3	7	19
5	Wolverhampton	18	9	0	9	18
6	Ipswich	18	8	0	10	16
7	Hull	18	7	0	11	14
8	Eastbourne	18	7	0	11	14
9	King's Lynn	18	5	3	10	13
10	Belle Vue	17	5	1	11	11

Home \ Away	BV	COV	EAS	HV	IPS	KL	OX	PET	PP	WOL
Belle Vue		43–47	56–34	52–38	46–44	47–43	n–h	51–39	45–45	45–46
Coventry	48–42		49–41	46–44	56–34	49–41	34–54	50–43	46–44	55–35
Eastbourne	49–41	51–39		49–41	50–41	50–40	44–48	47–42	41–49	47–42
Hull	65–24	44–46	49–41		50–39	46–44	44–46	43–47	47–43	46–44
Ipswich	52–38	52–38	53–40	42–46		49–41	52–38	43–47	44–45	52–38
King's Lynn	59–30	44–45	57–34	54–38	37–53		53–37	45–45	53–40	43–47
Oxford	50.5–39.5	55–35	52–32	48–42	59–30	45–45		48–42	46–44	47–43
Peterborough	53–37	55–35	65–25	57–33	56–34	59–31	51–39		45–45	58–32
Poole	57–33	58–31	57–34	56–34	44–46	45–45	43–48	52–38		54–33
Wolverhampton	49–41	43–47	57–35	47–43	57–33	48–42	41–52	54–35	46–44	

Legend: Blue = home team win; Yellow = draw; Red = away team win.

Semi-final

Team one	Team two	Score
Coventry	Oxford	55–35, 45–45
Poole	Peterborough	47–43, 38–52

Final

Team one	Team two	Score
Coventry	Peterborough	55–37, 35–55

== Riders' Championship ==
Jason Crump won the Elite League Riders' Championship, held at the Brandon Stadium on 23 October.

Pos.	Rider	Pts	Total	SF	Final
1	(Australia) Jason Crump	3 2 1 3 3	12	x	3
2	(Australia) Todd Wiltshire	3 1 3 1 3	11	3	2
3	(Australia) Jason Lyons	3 3 1 2 1	10	2	1
4	(England) Mark Loram	3 2 3 1 3	12	x	0
5	(Sweden) Peter Karlsson	1 1 3 2 2	9	1	
6	(Sweden) Mikael Karlsson	2 3 2 0 2	9	0	
7	(United States) Billy Hamill	0 3 1 1 3	8		
8	(Australia) Ryan Sullivan	1 0 3 3 1	8		
9	(England) Joe Screen	1 1 2 2 2	8		
10	(Australia) Leigh Adams	1 3 0 3 0	7		
11	(England) Chris Louis	2 0 2 3 0	7		
12	(Denmark) Brian Andersen	2 0 1 1 2	6		
13	(United States) Ronnie Correy	0 2 0 2 1	5		
14	(Australia) Craig Boyce	2 0 2 0 0	4		
15	(England) Gary Havelock	0 2 0 0 1	3		
16	(England) Dean Barker	0 1 0 0 0	1		

== Leading averages ==
Rider	Team	Average
(Australia) Jason Crump	Peterborough	10.67
(England) Mark Loram	Poole	9.80
(Sweden) Tony Rickardsson	Kings Lynn	9.64
(Australia) Leigh Adams	Kings Lynn	9.47
(United States) Greg Hancock	Coventry	9.31
(Poland) Tomasz Gollob	Ipswich	9.24
(Australia) Ryan Sullivan	Peterborough	9.05
(England) Chris Louis	Ipswich	8.96
(United States) Billy Hamill	Coventry	8.91
(England) Joe Screen	Hull	8.76

== Riders & final averages ==
Belle Vue

- (Australia) Jason Lyons 8.66
- (Sweden) Jimmy Nilsen 8.27
- (England) Andy Smith 8.27
- (United States) Ronnie Correy 8.00
- (Finland) Kai Laukkanen 7.28
- (Australia) Jason Hawkes 3.25
- (United States) Chris Manchester 2.80
- (Denmark) Rene Madsen 2.67
- (Finland) Jarno Kosonen 2.33
- (England) Jon Armstrong 2.00
- (Australia) Kevin Doolan 1.60
- (Scotland) Barry Campbell 1.00

Coventry

- (United States) Greg Hancock 9.31
- (United States) Billy Hamill 8.91
- (Denmark) Brian Andersen 7.67
- (Sweden) Andreas Jonsson 6.47
- (England) Stuart Robson 5.91
- (England) Shaun Tacey 5.62
- (Denmark) Rene Madsen 5.43
- (Denmark) Charlie Gjedde 5.33
- (England) Scott Robson 3.01

Eastbourne

- (England) Martin Dugard 7.81
- (Sweden) Peter Nahlin 7.56
- (England) David Norris 7.09
- (England) Dean Barker 7.03
- (United States) Josh Larsen 6.41
- (Australia) Mark Lemon 6.07
- (Poland) Roman Povazhny 5.60
- (Australia) Brent Collyer 2.45
- (England) Seemond Stephens 1.40

Hull

- (England) Joe Screen 8.76
- (United States) Sam Ermolenko 8.60
- (Australia) Shane Parker 6.36
- (England) Ray Morton 5.86
- (England) Ben Howe 5.60
- (United States) Brent Werner 5.52
- (England) Garry Stead 5.35
- (Denmark) Lee Dicken 4.67
- (England) Paul Thorp 3.80
- (England) Paul Smith 1.66

Ipswich

- (Poland) Tomasz Gollob 9.24
- (England) Chris Louis 8.96
- (Czech Republic) Antonín Šváb Jr. 7.30
- (Czech Republic) Tomáš Topinka 6.33
- (England) Ben Howe 6.33
- (England) Savalas Clouting 4.99
- (Australia) Brett Woodifield 4.82
- (New Zealand) Jason Bunyan 3.35

King's Lynn

- (Sweden) Tony Rickardsson 9.64
- (Australia) Leigh Adams 9.47
- (Sweden) Stefan Andersson 7.56
- (Czech Republic) Bohumil Brhel 7.22
- (Czech Republic) Tomáš Topinka 6.78
- (Germany) Robbie Kessler 4.85
- (England) Paul Lee 4.45
- (Australia) Travis McGowan 3.79
- (England) Martin Dixon 3.21
- (England) David Meldrum2.18

Oxford

- (Australia) Todd Wiltshire 8.18
- (England) Paul Hurry 7.23
- (Australia) Craig Boyce 6.99
- (Australia) Steve Johnston 6.74
- (Denmark) Jan Stæchmann 6.51
- (England) Lawrence Hare 5.40
- (England) Alun Rossiter 5.08

Peterborough

- (Australia) Jason Crump 10.67
- (Australia) Ryan Sullivan 9.05
- (Czech Republic) Zdeněk Tesař 7.12
- (Australia) Nigel Sadler 5.97
- (Czech Republic) Marián Jirout 5.83
- (England) David Howe 5.53
- (Denmark) Jan Andersen 5.47

Poole

- (England) Mark Loram 9.80
- (England) Scott Nicholls 8.64
- (England) Gary Havelock 8.42
- (England) Lee Richardson 7.41
- (Sweden) Magnus Zetterström 6.59
- (Slovenia) Matej Ferjan 6.20
- (England) Oliver Allen 2.29
- (England) Martin Willis 1.81

Wolverhampton

- (Sweden) Peter Karlsson 8.27
- (Sweden) Mikael Karlsson 8.08
- (Denmark) Nicki Pedersen 7.64
- (Denmark) Jesper B. Jensen 6.98
- (Denmark) John Jørgensen 6.65
- (Czech Republic) George Štancl 5.96
- (Denmark) Charlie Gjedde 5.12
- (Denmark) Richard Juul 4.73
- (England) Craig Taylor 2.10

== See also ==
- Speedway in the United Kingdom
- List of United Kingdom Speedway League Champions
- Knockout Cup (speedway)
