= 2002 Elite League speedway season =

British motorcycle speedway season

- League: Sky Sports Elite League
- Champions: Wolverhampton Wolves
- Knockout Cup: Eastbourne Eagles
- Craven Shield: Poole Pirates
- Riders Championship: Tony Rickardsson
- Highest average: Tony Rickardsson
- Division/s below: Premier League; Conference League

The 2002 Elite League speedway season was the 68th season of the top division of speedway in the United Kingdom and in 2002 was governed by the Speedway Control Board (SCB), in conjunction with the British Speedway Promoters' Association (BSPA). It was the first time that playoffs were introduced to determine the champions.

== Season summary ==
In 2002, the league consisted of nine teams. The title was decided by a play-off between the top five teams. The team that finished top of the table were seeded directly to the final. The next four met in quarter and semi final rounds. The winner of these rounds qualified for the final.

Eastbourne Eagles topped the regular season table but were defeated by Wolverhampton Wolves for the league title when losing the play off final. It was Wolves third title success in 11 years and the Swedish Karlsson brothers, Peter Karlsson and Mikael Karlsson were once again integral to the Wolves team throughout the season. Eastbourne's season was not a total loss because they beat Peterborough in the final of the Knockout Cup thanks to efforts from their English rider contingent of Mark Loram, Joe Screen and Dean Barker.

Tony Rickardsson became World Champion for the fifth time during the season, topped the league averages, won the Elite League Riders' Championship and helped his club Poole win the Craven Shield.

== Final table ==
Pos		M	W	D	L	F	A	Pts	Bon	Tot
1	Eastbourne Eagles	32	20	3	9	1562	1316	43	15	58
2	Wolverhampton Wolves	32	20	2	10	1549	1311	42	12	54
3	Coventry Bees	32	19	3	10	1492	1383	41	9	50
4	Poole Pirates	32	17	1	14	1455	1406	35	11	46
5	Peterborough Panthers	31	15	0	16	1394	1395	30	6	36
6	Oxford Cheetahs	31	14	2	15	1369	1407	30	5	35
7	Ipswich Witches	32	11	3	18	1375	1494	25	6	31
8	Belle Vue Aces	32	11	3	18	1379	1484	25	4	29
9	King's Lynn Silver Machine	32	7	1	24	1247	1626	15	3	18

_{Peterborough v Oxford not held.}

= Qualified for Play Off final
= Qualified for Play Offs

=== 'A' Fixtures ===
Home \ Away	BV	COV	EAS	IPS	KL	OX	PET	PP	WOL
Belle Vue Aces		44–46	42–48	53–37	48–42	45–45	53–37	48–42	45–45
Coventry Bees	49–40		43–47	42–48	60–30	48–42	54–35	51–39	47–43
Eastbourne Eagles	60–30	44–45		55–35	58–32	48–42	64–26	60–30	56–34
Ipswich Witches	37–52	52–38	45–44		49–35	40–51	46–44	45–45	41–49
King's Lynn Silver Machine	43–47	32–48	37–53	47–42		55–35	51–41	49–41	39–51
Oxford Cheetahs	47–43	44–46	43–47	48–42	47–43		38–52	46–44	46–44
Peterborough Panthers	46–43	46–44	44–46	59–31	64–26	45–44		47–43	49–41
Poole Pirates	52–38	50–40	47–44	51–39	49–41	50–40	55–35		48–42
Wolverhampton Wolves	55–35	53–37	47–43	58–31	59–31	43–47	51–39	48–24	

Legend: Blue = home team win; Yellow = draw; Red = away team win.

=== 'B' Fixtures ===
Home \ Away	BV	COV	EAS	IPS	KL	OX	PET	PP	WOL
Belle Vue Aces		38–51	45–45	49–41	59–31	42–36	47–43	47–43	41–49
Coventry Bees	49–41		45–45	49–41	62–28	51–39	51–39	40–50	47–43
Eastbourne Eagles	50–40	45–45		44–46	58–32	51–38	54–36	49–41	51–39
Ipswich Witches	49–41	56–34	43–47		45–45	47–43	457–33	50–40	39–50
King's Lynn Silver Machine	59–31	37–52	44–46	50–40		49–41	42–48	40–50	42–47
Oxford Cheetahs	47–42	46–44	51–39	45–45	52–38		47–43	54–36	50–40
Peterborough Panthers	52–38	58–32	50–40	48–42	65–25	n/a		41–49	55–35
Poole Pirates	52–38	43–47	52–38	50–39	60–29	53–37	46–44		44–46
Wolverhampton Wolves	56–34	45–45	47–43	55–35	67–23	52–38	60–30	54–36	

Legend: Blue = home team win; Yellow = draw; Red = away team win.

== Play-offs ==
Quarter-final and Semi-final decided over one leg. Grand Final decided by aggregate scores over two legs.

Quarter-finals

- Wolverhampton Wolves 50-39 Peterborough Panthers
- Coventry Bees 59-31 Poole Pirates

Semi-finals

- Wolverhampton Wolves 51-39 Coventry Bees

=== Final ===
First leg

25 September 2002

Wolverhampton Wolves Mikael Karlsson 13 Peter Karlsson 12 Paul Hurry 9 Jesper B. Jensen 5 David Howe 5 Chris Neath 3 Adam Skórnicki 2	49 - 41	Eastbourne Eagles Mark Loram 10 Stefan Andersson 10 Joe Screen 9 David Norris 8 Dean Barker 2 Savalas Clouting 2 Adam Shields 0

Monmore Green Stadium

Second leg

2 October 2002

Eastbourne Eagles Mark Loram 12 Billy Janniro 12 Dean Barker 6 Stefan Andersson 5 Joe Screen 5 David Norris 4 Edward Kennett 2	46 - 44	Wolverhampton Wolves Mikael Karlsson 14 Peter Karlsson 10 David Howe 8 Adam Skórnicki 6 Jesper B. Jensen 3 Chris Neath 3 Paul Hurry 0

Arlington Stadium

The Wolverhampton Wolves were declared League Champions, winning on aggregate 93-87.

== Elite League Knockout Cup ==
The 2002 Elite League Knockout Cup was the 64th edition of the Knockout Cup for tier one teams. Eastbourne Eagles were the winners of the competition.

First round

Date	Team one	Score	Team two
08/04	Wolverhampton	57-33	Poole
03/04	Poole	45-45	Wolverhampton

Quarter-finals

Date	Team one	Score	Team two
27/05	Reading	47-43	Arena Essex
29/04	Wolverhampton	61-29	Oxford
27/04	Coventry	36-35	Kings Lynn
26/04	Oxford	45-45	Wolverhampton
24/04	Kings Lynn	42-48	Coventry
22/04	Belle Vue	51-39	Peterborough
20/04	Eastbourne	54-36	Ipswich
19/04	Peterborough	59-31	Belle Vue
18/04	Ipswich	39-51	Eastbourne

Semi-finals

Date	Team one	Score	Team two
01/07	Wolverhampton	40-49	Eastbourne
29/06	Coventry	49-41	Peterborough
29/06	Eastbourne	52-38	Wolverhampton
28/06	Peterborough	50-40	Coventry

=== Final ===
First leg

21 September 2002

Eastbourne Eagles David Norris 14 Mark Loram 14 Dean Barker 8 Adam Shields 7 Stefan Andersson 6 Joe Screen 5 Savalas Clouting 1	55 - 35	Peterborough Panthers Lee Richardson (guest) 13 Mark Lemon (guest) 9 Zdeněk Tesař 9 Shane Parker 3 Chris Harris 1 Jason King 0 R/R

Arlington Stadium

Second leg

9 October 2002

Peterborough Panthers Ryan Sullivan 15 Shane Parker 10 Magnus Zetterström 8 Chris Harris 6 Piotr Protasiewicz 6 Simon Stead 5 Zdeněk Tesař 1	51 - 39	Eastbourne Eagles Mark Loram 9 Joe Screen 9 Dean Barker 9 Steve Johnston 7 Adam Shields 3 Stefan Andersson 2 Paul Lee 0

East of England Showground

The Eastbourne Eagles were declared Knockout Cup Champions, winning on aggregate 94-86.

== Craven Shield ==
Anglia

Pos	Team	M	W	D	L	Pts
1	Ipswich	4	3	0	1	6
2	Peterbrorough	4	2	0	2	4
3	King's Lynn	4	1	0	3	2

Midland

Pos	Team	M	W	D	L	Pts
1	Coventry	4	3	0	1	6
2	Belle Vue	2	1	0	1	2
3	Wolverhampton	2	0	0	2	0

South

Pos	Team	M	W	D	L	Pts
1	Poole	4	2	0	2	4
2	Eastbourne	4	2	0	2	4
3	Oxford	4	2	0	2	4

Home \ Away	IPS	KL	PET
Ipswich		46–44	47–43
King's Lynn	44–46		47–43
Peterborough	51–39	57–33	

Legend: Blue = home team win; Yellow = draw; Red = away team win.

Home \ Away	BV	COV	WOL
Belle Vue		49–40	n–h
Coventry	51–39		51–39
Wolverhampton	n–h	41–51	

Legend: Blue = home team win; Yellow = draw; Red = away team win.

Home \ Away	EAS	OX	PP
Eastbourne		52–38	49–41
Oxford	46–44		46–44
Poole	49–41	54–36	

Legend: Blue = home team win; Yellow = draw; Red = away team win.

Final

Leg	Team one	Team two	Team three	Score
1	Poole	Coventry	Ipswich	44–32–32
2	Ipswich	Coventry	Poole	45–33–30
3	Coventry	Poole	Ipswich	36–40–32

== Riders' Championship ==
Tony Rickardsson won the Riders' Championship for the second time. The final was held at Wimborne Road on 21 August.

Pos.	Rider	Pts	Total	SF	Final
1	(Sweden) Tony Rickardsson	1 3 3 3 3	13	x	3
2	(Denmark) Nicki Pedersen	3 3 3 3 2	14	x	2
3	(Australia) Jason Crump	3 3 3 1 0	10	2	1
4	(Australia) Craig Boyce	1 2 3 2 3	11	3	0
5	(Sweden) Mikael Karlsson	3 3 2 3 1	12	1	
6	(Australia) Ryan Sullivan	3 2 1 3 3	12	0	
7	(Sweden) Peter Karlsson	2 2 2 2 2	10		
8	(England) Joe Screen	2 2 1 2 0	7		
9	(England) Scott Nicholls	2 1 0 1 3	7		
10	(Poland) Sebastian Ułamek	1 1 0 2 2	6		
11	(England) Stuart Robson	1 0 1 1 2	5		
12	(England) Mark Loram	2 0 2 0 1	5		
13	(England) Gary Havelock	0 0 2 1 1	4		
14	(Australia) Davey Watt	0 1 1 0 1	3		
15	(Australia) Jason Lyons	0 1 0	1		
16	(England) Alun Rossiter	0 0 0 0 0	0		

== Leading final averages ==
Rider	Team	Average
(Sweden) Tony Rickardsson	Poole	10.88
(Australia) Jason Crump	Belle Vue	10.44
(Australia) Ryan Sullivan	Peterborough	10.34
(Australia) Leigh Adams	Oxford	10.10
(Sweden) Mikael Karlsson	Wolverhampton	9.93
(England) Scott Nicholls	Ipswich	9.76
(England) Mark Loram	Eastbourne	9.56
(Sweden) Andreas Jonsson	Coventry	9.39
(Sweden) Peter Karlsson	Wolverhampton	9.23
(England) Lee Richardson	Coventry	8.97

== Riders & final averages ==
Belle Vue

- (Australia) Jason Crump 10.44
- (Australia) Jason Lyons 8.41
- (Denmark) Brian Karger 6.89
- (United States) Sam Ermolenko 6.38
- (Finland) Kai Laukkanen 5.67
- (England) Scott Robson 4.71
- (Slovenia) Matej Ferjan 4.57
- (Poland) Tomasz Jędrzejak 3.95
- (England) Lee Complin 2.38
- (Scotland) Blair Scott 1.24
- (England) Mark Burrows 1.10

Coventry

- (Sweden) Andreas Jonsson 9.39
- (England) Lee Richardson 8.97
- (United States) Billy Hamill 8.72
- (United States) Billy Janniro 6.87
- (Czech Republic) Tomáš Topinka 5.82
- (England) Stuart Robson 5.81
- (United States) Ryan Fisher 5.28
- (England) Wayne Carter 1.52

Eastbourne

- (England) Mark Loram 9.56
- (England) Joe Screen 8.46
- (England) David Norris 7.81
- (Czech Republic) Antonín Šváb Jr. 7.21
- (England) Dean Barker 7.17
- (Sweden) Stefan Andersson 6.54
- (Australia) Adam Shields 5.88
- (England) Savalas Clouting 4.14

Ipswich

- (England) Scott Nicholls 9.76
- (Poland) Jarosław Hampel 7.91
- (Australia) Craig Boyce 7.15
- (England) Chris Louis 6.51
- (Poland) Krzysztof Słaboń 5.95
- (England) Jeremy Doncaster 5.10
- (Finland) Joonas Kylmäkorpi 4.95
- (England) Danny Bird 4.76
- (Sweden) Kim Jansson 4.00
- (England) Leigh Lanham 3.52

King's Lynn

- (Denmark) Nicki Pedersen 8.47
- (Poland) Sebastian Ułamek 7.26
- (Sweden) Freddie Eriksson 6.33
- (Denmark) Tom P. Madsen 5.53
- (Australia) Travis McGowan 5.23
- (Poland) Artur Pietrzyk 4.27
- (Poland) Roman Povazhny 4.21
- (Slovenia) Jernej Kolenko 3.58
- (Sweden) Emil Kramer 3.40

Oxford

- (Australia) Leigh Adams 10.10
- (Australia) Steve Johnston 6.83
- (Czech Republic) Lukáš Dryml 6.29
- (Australia) Mark Lemon 5.56
- (Denmark) Brian Andersen 5.50
- (Czech Republic) Aleš Dryml Jr. 4.92
- (Poland) Krzysztof Jabłoński 4.00
- (England) Andrew Appleton 2.90
- (Germany) Joachim Kugelmann 2.67
- (England) Alun Rossiter 2.07

Peterborough

- (Australia) Ryan Sullivan 10.34
- (Sweden) Magnus Zetterström 6.98
- (Poland) Piotr Protasiewicz 6.88
- (England) Simon Stead 6.54
- (Czech Republic) Zdeněk Tesař 6.47
- (Australia) Shane Parker 6.13
- (Denmark) Hans Clausen 5.87
- (England) Chris Harris 5.00
- (Denmark) Henning Bager 3.75
- (England) Oliver Allen 3.08

Poole

- (Sweden) Tony Rickardsson 10.88
- (Denmark) Bjarne Pedersen 6.82
- (England) Gary Havelock 6.70
- (Denmark) Hans N. Andersen 6.56
- (Poland) Grzegorz Walasek 6.32
- (Norway) Lars Gunnestad 6.20
- (Sweden) Henka Gustaffson 6.00
- (Sweden) Magnus Zetterström 5.41
- (Poland) Mariusz Staszewski 4.43
- (Poland) Tomasz Chrzanowski 4.34
- (England) Andre Compton 3.88

Wolverhampton

- (Sweden) Mikael Karlsson 9.93
- (Sweden) Peter Karlsson 9.23
- (Poland) Adam Skórnicki 7.32
- (Sweden) Daniel Nermark 7.27
- (England) Paul Hurry 6.80
- (England) David Howe 6.67
- (Denmark) Jesper B. Jensen 5.81
- (England) Chris Neath 4.08
- (Denmark) Lee Dicken 1.56

== See also ==
- Speedway in the United Kingdom
- List of United Kingdom Speedway League Champions
- Knockout Cup (speedway)
