= Krzysztof Słaboń =

Polish speedway rider

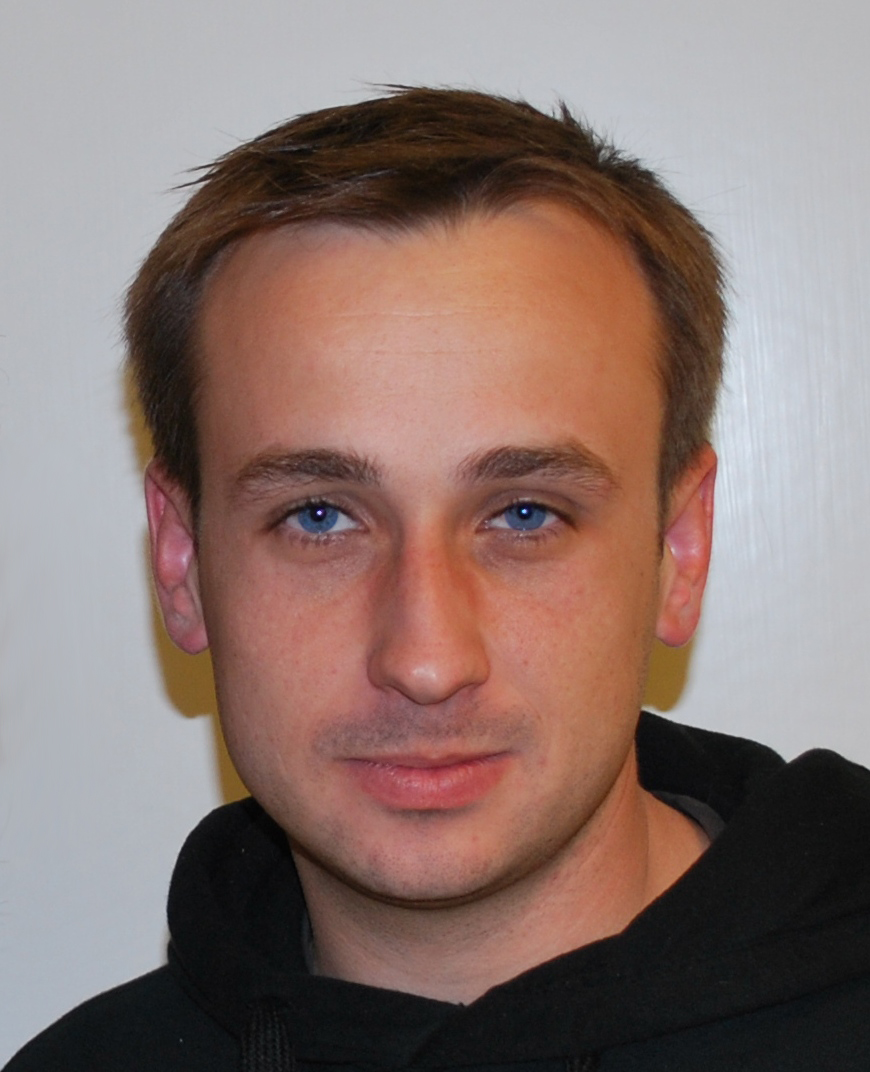
- Born: 21 February 1981 (age 45); Wrocław, Poland
- Nationality: Canadian, Polish

Career history

Poland
- 1998–2000: Bydgoszcz
- 2001–2002, 2004–2005, 2007–2008: Wrocław
- 2003: Zielona Góra
- 2006: Toruń
- 2009: Gniezno
- 2010: Częstochowa
- 2011: Poznań

Great Britain
- 2002, 2003, 2010: Ipswich Witches

Sweden
- 2003–2004: Rospiggarna

Krzysztof Słaboń or Chris Slabon (born 21 February 1981) is a former motorcycle speedway rider from Canada and Poland.

== Speedway career ==
Słaboń also held a Canadian licence and rode under the Canadian flag during the 1999 Individual Speedway Junior World Championship.

Słaboń first rode in the top tier of British Speedway, riding for the Ipswich Witches during the 2002 Elite League speedway season. He would later return to the East Anglian club for the 2003 Elite League speedway season and 2010 Elite League speedway seasons.

Słaboń's Polish career lasted from 1998 to 2011 and he rode mainly for Sparta Wrocław and Polonia Bydgoszcz.

== Family ==
Słaboń's father, Robert, was also a speedway rider.
