= Adam Skórnicki =

Polish motorcycle speedway rider (born 1976)

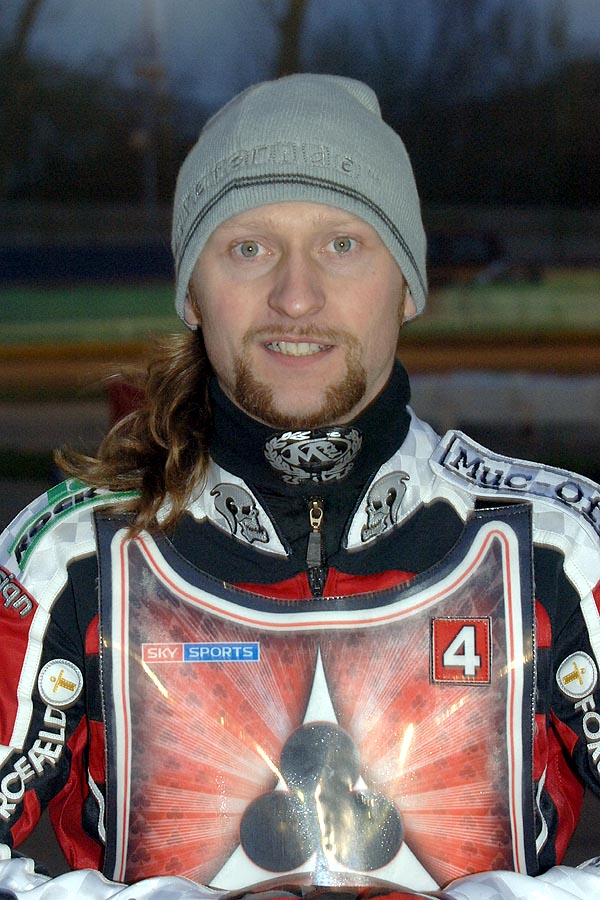
- Skórnicki in 2007
- Born: 22 October 1976 (age 50); Wolsztyn, Poland
- Nickname: Sqóra
- Nationality: Polish

Career history

Poland
- 1994–1999, 2004–2005: Unia Leszno
- 2000: Częstochowa
- 2001–2002: Rawicz
- 2003, 2010: Gniezno
- 2006–2008: Poznań
- 2009: Gdańsk

Great Britain
- 2000–2005, 2009–2010, 2013: Wolverhampton Wolves
- 2005: Lakeside Hammers
- 2006: Oxford Cheetahs
- 2007: Belle Vue Aces
- 2008: Poole Pirates
- 2014: Birmingham Brummies

Sweden
- 2003–2004: Valsarna
- 2005–2006: Bajen
- 2007, 2008: Elit Vetlanda
- 2007: Rospiggarna
- 2009–2012: Vargarna

Denmark
- 2001: Holsted
- 2008: Esbjerg

Individual honours
- 1999: Latvian Champion
- 2008: Polish Champion

Team honours
- 2002, 2008, 2009: Elite League Champion
- 2002: Craven Shield
- 1996, 1997: Polish Junior Pairs Champion

Adam Skórnicki (born 22 October 1976 in Wolsztyn, Poland) is a former motorcycle speedway rider from Poland.

== Career ==
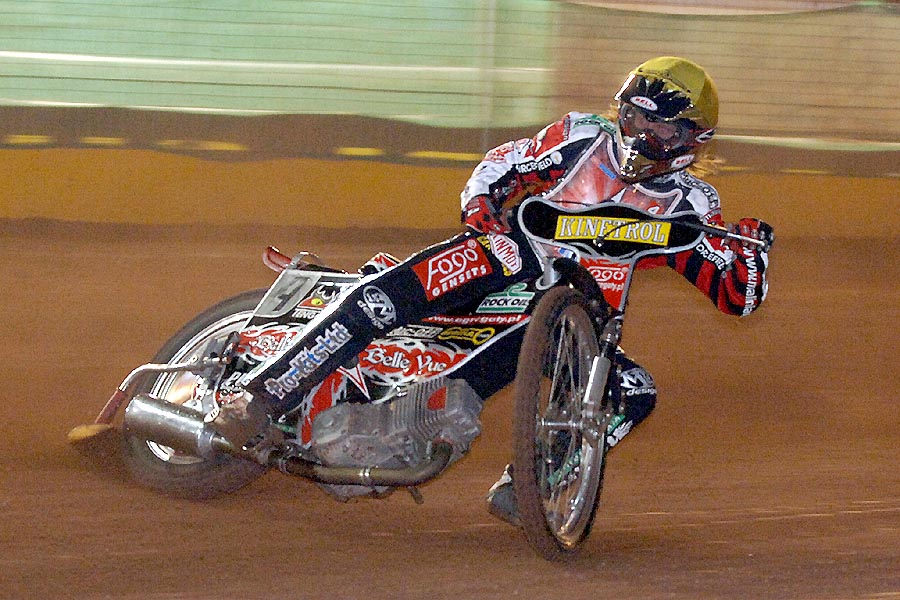
Skornicki riding for Belle Vue

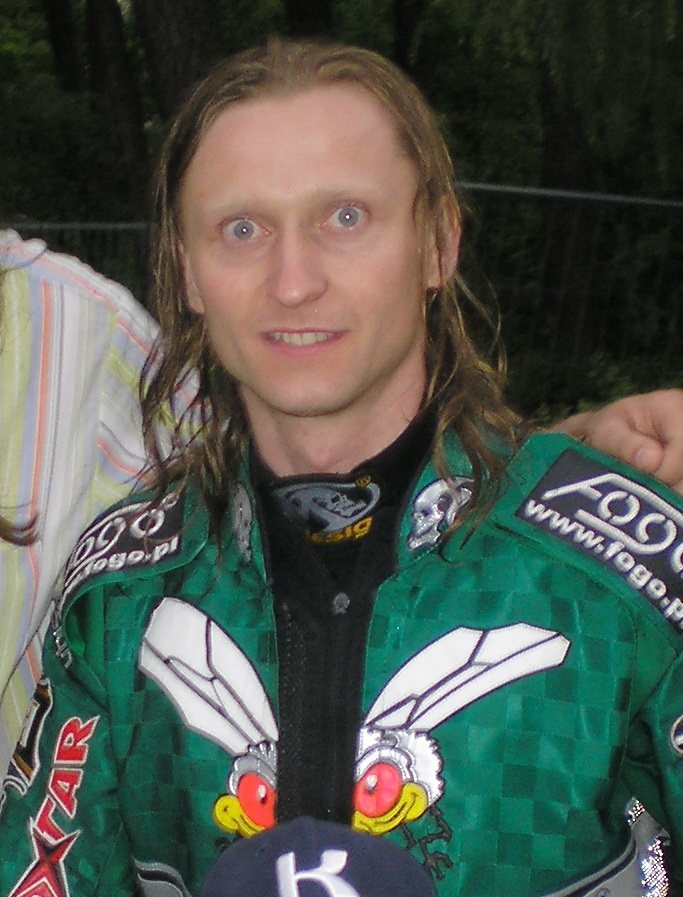
Skornicki in Poznań colours

Skórnicki started racing in Poland for Unia Leszno in the 1994 Polish Speedway First League; he would spend six seasons with the club until the end of 1999. Skórnicki's first British club was Wolverhampton Wolves, whom he signed for in 2000. He had six successful years there, scoring over 1000 points for the club and winning the Elite League Championship in 2002. His averaged improved from 5.79 in 2000 to 8.14 in 2005.

Skórnicki was loaned out to Lakeside, Oxford and Belle Vue for the next three seasons, all of whom struggled at the bottom of the Elite League table. In 2002, Skórnicki made a guest appearance for the Poole Pirates in two legs of the Craven Shield Final. While riding in Poland during the same season, he sustained a broken collarbone and dislocated shoulder in a track crash.

Skórnicki signed for Poole on loan in 2008 and went on to win the 2008 Elite League championship with the club. In August 2008, Skórnicki became the Individual Polish Champion for the first time with a 15-point maximum score.

For the 2009 season, Skórnicki returned to his parent club the Wolverhampton Wolves in the United Kingdom. He also changed clubs in Poland and Sweden, to Gdańsk (in the Ekstraliga) and Vargarna respectively. For Wolves, he became a regular points scorer and was integral during the 2009 Elite League speedway season, when Wolves won the league title, giving Skórnicki his second consecutive title.

In 2010, Skórnicki remained with Wolves and returned to Poznań from Gdańsk. It was his 17th consecutive season in the Polish leagues. He rode for various British and Polish clubs from 2012 to 2014 before retiring.

In June 2014, Skórnicki was appointed as a manager of Unia Leszno

In 2017, Skórnicki made a brief return, riding a handful of matches for his first British club Wolves and Kolejarz Rawicz in Poland.
