= 1999 Speedway Under-21 World Championship =

European motorcycle speedway event

World Under-21 Championship
- Venue: Vojens Speedway Center
- Location: Vojens, Denmark
- Start date: 8 August 1999

The 1999 Individual Speedway Junior World Championship was the 23rd edition of the World motorcycle speedway Under-21 Championships.

The final was won by Lee Richardson of England. By winning the championship he also gained qualification to the Speedway Grand Prix Challenge.

== World final ==
- 8 August 1999
- (Denmark) Speedway Center, Vojens

| Placing | Rider | Total | 1 | 2 | 3 | 4 | 5 | 6 | 7 | 8 | 9 | 10 | 11 | 12 | 13 | 14 | 15 | 16 | 17 | 18 | 19 | 20 | Pts | Pos | 21 | 22 | 23 | 24 |
|---|---|---|---|---|---|---|---|---|---|---|---|---|---|---|---|---|---|---|---|---|---|---|---|---|---|---|---|---|
| 1 | (England) (2) Lee Richardson | 13 | 3 | | | | | 3 | | | | 1 | | | | 3 | | | | 3 | | | 13 | 1 | | | | |
| 2 | (Czech Republic) (15) Aleš Dryml, Jr. | 11 | | | | 2 | | | 3 | | | 2 | | | | | | 2 | 2 | | | | 11 | 2 | | | | |
| 3 | (Australia) (3) Nigel Sadler | 10 | 2 | | | | | | 2 | | | | 2 | | | | 3 | | | | 1 | | 10 | 7 | 2 | | 3 | 3 |
| 4 | (Denmark) (8) Hans N. Andersen | 10 | | 2 | | | | | | 2 | | | 3 | | | 0 | | | 3 | | | | 10 | 4 | | 3 | | 2 |
| 5 | (Denmark) (6) Charlie Gjedde | 10 | | 3 | | | | 2 | | | 3 | | | | | | | 0 | | | 2 | | 10 | 3 | 3 | | | 1 |
| 6 | (Poland) (4) Rafał Okoniewski | 10 | 1 | | | | | | | 3 | | | | 2 | | | | 3 | | | | 1 | 10 | 6 | 1 | | 2 | E |
| 7 | (Denmark) (16) Bjarne Pedersen | 10 | | | | 3 | | | | 1 | 2 | | | | | | 2 | | | 2 | | | 10 | 8 | | 1 | 1 | |
| 8 | (England) (11) Scott Nicholls | 10 | | | 3 | | | | 1 | | 1 | | | | | 2 | | | | | | 3 | 10 | 5 | | 2 | 0 | |
| 9 | (Poland) (13) Mariusz Franków | 8 | | | | E | 3 | | | | | | | 1 | | 1 | | | | | 3 | | 8 | 9 | | | | |
| 10 | (Poland) (10) Tomasz Cieślewicz | 8 | | | 2 | | | 1 | | | | | | 3 | | | 1 | | 1 | | | | 8 | 10 | | | | |
| 11 | (England) (14) David Howe | 6 | | | | 1 | | 0 | | | | | 0 | | 3 | | | | | | | 2 | 6 | 11 | | | | |
| 12 | (Australia) (9) Kevin Doolan | 6 | | | 1 | | 2 | | | | | | 1 | | | | | 1 | | 1 | | | 6 | 12 | | | | |
| 13 | (Poland) (5) Tomasz Chrzanowski | 5 | | 1 | | | 1 | | | | | 3 | | | | | 0 | | | | | 0 | 5 | 13 | | | | |
| 14 | (Poland) (12) Paweł Duszyński | 2 | | | 0 | | | | | 0 | | 0 | | | 2 | | | | | | 0 | | 2 | 14 | | | | |
| 15 | (England) (7) Simon Stead | 1 | | 0 | | | | | 0 | | | | | 0 | 1 | | | | | 0 | | | 1 | 15 | | | | |
| 16 | (Canada) (1) Chris Slabon | 0 | 0 | | | | 0 | | | | 0 | | | | F | | | | 0 | | | | 0 | 16 | | | | |
| R1 | (Denmark) (R1) Jack Gundestrup | 0 | | | | | | | | | | | | | | | | | | | | | 0 | R1 | | | | |
| R2 | (Czech Republic) (R2) Josef Franc | 0 | | | | | | | | | | | | | | | | | | | | | 0 | R2 | | | | |
| Placing | Rider | Total | 1 | 2 | 3 | 4 | 5 | 6 | 7 | 8 | 9 | 10 | 11 | 12 | 13 | 14 | 15 | 16 | 17 | 18 | 19 | 20 | Pts | Pos | 21 | 22 | 23 | 24 |

m - exclusion for exceeding two minute time allowance • t - exclusion for touching the tapes • x - other exclusion • e - retired or mechanical failure • f - fell • ns - non-starter • nc - non-classify

| gate A - inside | gate B | gate C | gate D - outside |

- Heat 21: 1st Semi-Final (3-8 place)
  1. 1st: into Final
  2. 2nd: into Last chance
  3. 3rd: into Last chance
- Heat 22: 2nd Semi-Final (3-8 place)
  1. 1st: into Final
  2. 2nd: into Last chance
  3. 3rd: into Last chance
- Heat 23: Last chance (3-8 place)
  1. 1st: into Final
  2. 2nd: into Final
  3. 3rd: 7th place
  4. 4th: 8th place
- Heat 24: Final (3-6 place)
  1. 1st: 3rd place
  2. 2nd: 4th place
  3. 3rd: 5th place
  4. 4th: 6th place
