= Nigel Sadler =

Australian speedway rider

- Born: 17 September 1978 (age 48); Blackwood, Australia
- Nationality: Australian

Career history

Great Britain
- 1997: Isle of Wight/Skegness Warriors
- 1998–2003: Peterborough Panthers
- 2003: Rye House Rockets

Poland
- 1999: Częstochowa

Sweden
- 2003: Örnarna

Individual honours
- 1999: Australian U21 champion
- 1999: World U21 bronze medal
- 1998, 2000: South Australian Champion

Team honours
- 1998: Premier league
- 1998: Premier League Fours
- 1999: Elite league & cup double

Nigel Sadler (born 17 September 1978) is an Australian former motorcycle speedway rider.

== Career ==
Sadler made his British leagues debut during the 1997 Premier League speedway season, where he rode for Skegness Braves. However, Skegness disbanded and were replaced mid season by Isle of Wight Warriors. Sadler also won the silver medal at the 1997 Australian Under-21 Individual Speedway Championship.

The following season, Sadler joined the Peterborough Panthers for the 1998 Premier League speedway season and quickly established himself as a heat leader and helped the team win the league title. He was also a part of the Peterborough four that won the Premier League Four-Team Championship, which was held on 30 August 1998, at the East of England Arena. He reached the final of the 1998 Speedway Under-21 World Championship as reserve and scored 5 points to finish 12th.

In 1999, Peterborough moved up to the 1999 Elite League and Sadler won a second successive league and cup double with the team. Also in 1999, he became the Australian U21 champion and reached the 1999 Speedway Under-21 World Championship final, winning a bronze medal.

Sadler spent the next four seasons (from 2000 to 2003) at Peterborough but the team failed to reach the heights of the previous two seasons. He also doubled up for Rye House Rockets in 2002 and 2003.
