= Jan Andersen (speedway rider) =

Danish speedway rider (born 1969)

- Born: 1 August 1969 (age 57); Sønderborg, Denmark
- Nationality: Danish

Career history

Denmark
- 1992–1994: Slangerup
- 1996, 2001: Slangerup
- 1999: Outrup

Great Britain
- 1992, 1994–1995, 2001: Edinburgh Monarchs
- 1996: Coventry Bees
- 1998–1999: Peterborough Panthers
- 2000: Ipswich Witches

Sweden
- 1999: Karlstad
- 2000: Filbyterna

Team honours
- 1999: Elite League champion
- 1998: Premier League champion

Jan Andersen (born 1 August 1969) is a former motorcycle speedway rider from Denmark. He earned one cap for the Denmark national speedway team.

== Career ==
Andersen started racing in the British leagues during the 1992 British League Division Two season, when riding for the Edinburgh Monarchs but struggled and would miss the 1993 season.

Andersen returned to Edinburgh in 1994 and enjoyed a better season averaging 7.12. He then performed very well in the top tier of British speedway for Edinburgh during the 1995 Premier League speedway season. The following season in 1996, he rode for the Coventry Bees. He missed the 1997 season before returning for his best spell in 1998.

Andersen's best seasons were experienced as a Peterborough Panthers rider, averaging 9.29 and helping the club win the league title during the 1998 Premier League speedway season. He became the captain of the team as they moved up a division to join the Elite League and steered the club to a second successive league title in 1999.

In 2000, Andersen had a poor season with the Ipswich Witches before returning to his first club Edinburgh for one final season. Head injuries forced his retirement and he was awarded a benefit meeting in 2002.

== Family ==
Andersen's brother Brian was a speedway rider and his nephew Mikkel is a world U16 chmapion.
