= Craven and Young Shields =

UK speedway competitions

- Sport: Speedway
- Founded: 1997
- Folded: Craven Shield (2008); Young Shield (2010)
- Country: Great Britain

The Craven Shield and Young Shield were short-lived speedway end of season cup competitions in the United Kingdom governed by the Speedway Control Bureau (SCB), in conjunction with the British Speedway Promoters' Association (BSPA).

== Craven Shield ==
Named in memory of Peter Craven (twice FIM World Champion), who was killed after a racing accident in 1963, it was held from 1997 until 2008. It was the end of season competition for top eight clubs in the league standings of the newly formed Elite League (the highest tier of speedway).

It was later a three-team tournament, with each team staging a leg on their own track and aggregate scores deciding the final placings. The format was changed in 2008 with three mini leagues of three teams with the best team overall of the three leagues progressing directly to the final. The semi final is contested by the other two league winners over two meetings home and away, with the winner progressing to the final.

=== Winners ===
Year	Winners
1997	Coventry Bees
1998	Ipswich Witches
1999	Peterborough Panthers
2000	Coventry Bees
2001	Poole Pirates
2002	Poole Pirates
2003	competition not held
2004	competition not held
2005	Oxford Silver Machine
2006	Poole Pirates
2007	Coventry Bees
2008	Coventry Bees

== Young Shield ==
Named in memory of Jack Young, an Australian who won two successive World Championships in 1951 and 1952, it was held from 1997 until 2010. It was the end of season competition for top eight clubs in the league standings of the re-formed Premier League (the second division/tier of speedway).

=== Winners ===
Year	Winners
1997	Exeter Falcons
1998	Isle of Wight Islanders
1999	Sheffield Tigers
2000	Swindon Robins
2001	Isle of Wight Islanders
2002	Sheffield Tigers
2003	competition not held
2004	Hull Vikings
2005	King's Lynn Stars
2006	competition not held
2007	Redcar Bears
2008	Workington Comets
2009	Workington Comets
2010	Workington Comets
