= Skegness Braves =

Defunct motorcycle speedway team

Club information
- Track address: Skegness Stadium; Marsh Lane; Orby; Skegness; Lincolnshire
- Country: England
- Founded: 1997
- Closed: 1998

Skegness Braves were a shortlived British motorcycle speedway team who operated at Skegness Stadium, in Orby, Skegness, Lincolnshire, England, between 1997 and 1998.

== History ==
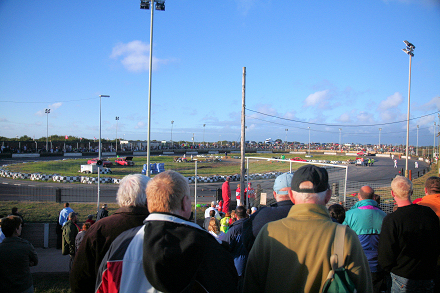
Skegness Stadium

In November 1996, news broke that Skegness could host a speedway team in the Premier League after a team was created by Peter Oakes, who was a promoter at Peterborough Panthers at the time.

The team entered the Premier League (second division) in 1997. During the 1997 Premier League speedway season the team withdrew and had their results expunged. Their final home fixture was on the 7 July.

The following season they failed to complete the league campaign again and withdrew after four matches in the 1998 Speedway Conference League. This time however their fixtures were completed by the Norfolk Braves.

== Season summary ==
Year and league	Position	Notes
1997 Premier League speedway season	N/A	withdrew, results expunged
1998 Speedway Conference League	N/A	withdrew, fixtures taken over by Norfolk Braves
