= Brett Woodifield =

Australian speedway rider

- Born: 15 March 1976 (age 50); Gawler, South Australia, Australia
- Nationality: Australian

Career history

Great Britain
- 1997: Skegness Braves
- 1997: Isle of Wight
- 1998, 2000: Peterborough Panthers
- 1999: Ipswich Witches
- 2001: Trelawny Tigers
- 2003: Rye House Rockets
- 2004: Workington Comets

Sweden
- 1996, 2001: Getingarna

Team honours
- 1998: Premier League winner
- 1998: Premier League Pairs winner
- 1998: Premier League Four-Team Championship

Brett Wayne Woodifield (born 15 March 1976) is a former motorcycle speedway rider from Australia.

== Career ==
Woodifield started his British leagues career during the 1997 Premier League speedway season, where he rode for Skegness Braves and the Isle of Wight Islanders, following the former's withdrawal from the league. The following season he signed for Peterborough Panthers and was part of the team that secured a 1998 League title. He was also selected by Peterborough for the Premier League Pairs Championship to partner Glenn Cunningham and the pair won the Championship. He completed a treble as part of the Peterborough four that won the Premier League Four-Team Championship, which was held on 30 August 1998, at the East of England Arena.

Peterborough moved up to the top division to compete in the 1999 Elite League speedway season, which saw Woodifield leave the club for the season and ride for rivals Ipswich Witches in the same division. He returned to Peterborough for the 2000 season before moving on to Trelawny Tigers in 2001.

Woodifield missed the 2002 British season after being refused a work permit before joining Rye House Rockets for 2003 and then Workington Comets for his final season in Britain in 2004.
