= Scott Lamb (speedway rider) =

Scottish motorcycle speedway rider

- Born: 28 October 1966 (age 60); Edinburgh, Scotland
- Nationality: British (Scottish)

Career history
- 1985, 1992, 1997–2001: Berwick Bandits
- 1985–1991, 1993–1996: Edinburgh Monarchs
- 1991: Newcastle Diamonds

Team honours
- 1993: Fours

Robert Scott Lamb (born 28 October 1966) is a former motorcycle speedway rider from Scotland.

== Biography ==
Lamb, born in Edinburgh, began his British leagues career riding for Berwick Bandits during the 1985 National League season. However, he was part of the exchange deal with Edinburgh Monarchs, that saw Scott Courtney head for Berwick, with Phil Jeffrey and Lamb heading in the other direction.

The following season in 1986, Lamb became a regular at Powderhall Stadium operating from the reserve berth. During the next five seasons he gradually improved his average, hitting a high in 1989 of 6.16.

Before the 1991 season got underway, Newcastle Diamonds signed Lamb and he experienced his best season to date recording 7.32 for the season and helping Newcastle seal third spot in the league standings. Despite the good season, he returned to his first club Berwick for 1992, after refusing deals offered by both Newcastle and Edinburgh.

Lamb's best season was to come in 1993, when he was once again an Edinburgh rider. He was part of the four that won the Fours championship final, held at the East of England Arena on 25 July 1993. His popularity grew with the Monarchs fans and he recorded a 7.85 season average in 1994 and enjoyed two consistent seasons in the top league during 1995 and 1996.

Lamb returned to Berwick in 1997 and would race for five seasons with them before ending his career in 2001.

After retiring, Lamb went into coaching, taking charge of the Mildenhall Fen Tigers in 2002.
