= Dave Mullett =

English speedway rider

- Born: 27 June 1965 (age 61); Folkestone, England
- Nationality: British (English)

Career history
- 1981, 1983–1987: Canterbury Crusaders
- 1984: Poole Pirates
- 1985–2002: Reading Racers

Individual honours
- 1991, 1992 1993, 1994 1996: British Championship finalist
- 1987: The Laurels Winner

Team honours
- 1990, 1992: British League (tier 1)
- 1990: Knockout Cup (tier 1)
- 1993: Fours (tier 1)
- 1997: Premier League (tier 2)
- 1998: Knockout Cup (tier 2)

David John Mullett (born 27 June 1965) is a former international speedway rider from England. He earned three international caps for the England national speedway team.

== Speedway career ==
Mullett reached the final of the British Speedway Championship on five occasions in 1991, 1992, 1993, 1994 and 1996. He rode in the top tier of British Speedway from 1981 to 2002, riding for Canterbury Crusaders and Reading Racers.

It was with Reading that Mullett made his name and became a club legend. He rode for the team 18 consecutive years from 1985 to 2002. He won the British League title twice with Reading in 1990 and 1992, the Knockout Cup in 1990 and the fours championship in 1993. He also won the Premier League title in 1997 and the Knockout Cup in 1998.
