= Stuart Robson (speedway rider) =

British motorcycle speedway rider (born 1976)

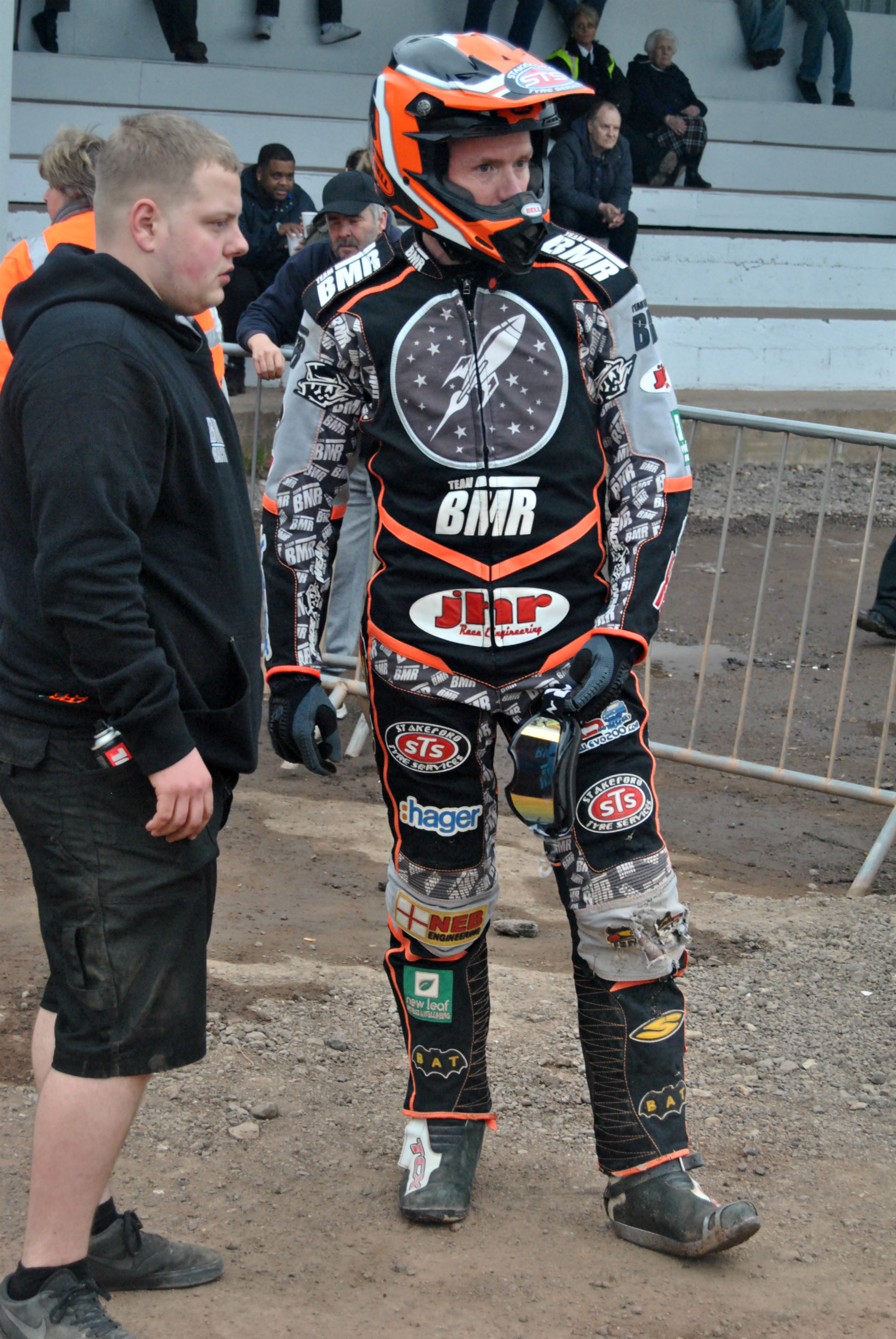
- Born: 8 November 1976 (age 50); Sunderland, England
- Nickname: Robbo
- Nationality: British (English)

Career history

Great Britain
- 1993-1994, 2003, 2011–2014, 2017-2018: Newcastle Diamonds
- 1995-1996, 1998-2004, 2013, 2015: Coventry Bees
- 1996: Middlesbrough Bears
- 1997: Hull Vikings
- 2005-2007: Rye House Rockets
- 2009-2012: Lakeside Hammers
- 2015: Redcar Bears

Sweden
- 2001: Norbaggarna

Team honours
- 2000: Craven Shield
- 2005: Premier League
- 2005: Premier Trophy
- 2009: Elite League KOC

Stuart Anthony Robson (born 8 November 1976 in Sunderland, Tyne and Wear) is a British motorcycle speedway rider. His brother Scott Robson also rode, as did his father John Robson.

== Career ==
Robson made his British racing debut in 1993, riding for the Newcastle Diamonds and in 32 matches he posted an average of 4.35. The following season was again with the Diamonds, where he averaged just under five points followed by a switch to Coventry in 1995 where he posted figures of 5.31. His 1996 season was split between Coventry and Middlesbrough, while in 1997 he joined brother Scott at the Hull Vikings in the East Riding of Yorkshire.

The following season, Robson returned to the top flight riding once again for Coventry in the Elite League, where he spent four seasons as a five-point averaged rider before a big year in 2003 when he pushed his average for the Bees up to just under seven points from 47 matches. He also doubled-down with the Newcastle Diamonds in 2003, achieving an 8.76 average from 25 matches. After spending the 2004 season again in the top-flight with the Coventry Bees, Robson celebrated his Testimonial year at Brandon. Stuart rode 354 matches for the Bees, equating to 1525 rides scoring 1816 points and a further 313 bonus points.

The end of the 2004 campaign saw Robson move to the Premier League team Rye House Rockets on a full transfer. At the end of 2008, Robson moved on a full transfer to Elite League club Lakeside Hammers for the 2009 season. He rode for the Hammers again in 2010.

At the end of the 2010 season, it was announced that Robson would ride for the Newcastle Diamonds full-time in the Premier League, whilst doubling up with the Lakeside Hammers in the Elite League. He continued to ride for Newcastle from 2011 to 2014.

After a third spell at Newcastle from 2017 to 2018, Robson announced his retirement from the sport.
