= Kevin Doolan =

Australian motorcycle speedway rider

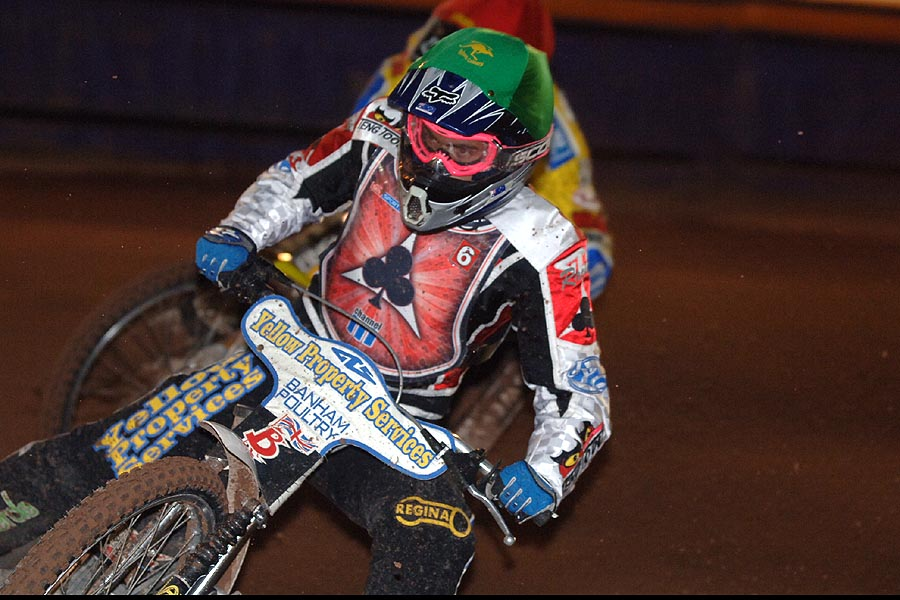
- Doolan riding for Belle Vue in 2007
- Born: 30 November 1990 (age 35); Shepparton, Victoria, Australia
- Nationality: Australian

Career history
- 1999–2000, 2007, 2009: Belle Vue Aces
- 2002, 2014–2019: Berwick Bandits
- 2003: Glasgow Tigers
- 2004–2006, 2008, 2010: King's Lynn Stars
- 2005, 2011–2012: Ipswich Witches
- 2006: Eastbourne Eagles
- 2009: Workington Comets
- 2011, 2013: Lakeside Hammers
- 2012: Redcar Bears
- 2013: Leicester Lions

Individual honours
- 2003, 2004: Gillman Solo Championship
- 2004, 2008: Jack Young Solo Cup winner

Team honours
- 2005, 2006: Premier League Knockout Cup
- 2006: Premier Trophy
- 2006: Premier League Champions
- 2009, 2011: Premier League Fours

Kevin Doolan (born 30 November 1980) is an Australian former motorcycle speedway rider.

== Biography ==
Born in Shepparton, Victoria, Doolan first raced in Australia, finishing third in the 1996 Australian Under-16 Championship.

Doolan began his British speedway career in 1999 with Belle Vue Aces. He was a finalist in the Junior World Championship in both 1999 and 2000. He moved on to Berwick Bandits in 2002 and Glasgow Tigers in 2003 before signing for then Premier League King's Lynn Stars as a club asset in 2004. Back home in Australia, Doolan was the winner of the 2003 and 2004 Gillman Solo Championships held at the Gillman Speedway in Adelaide and also won the 2004 Jack Young Solo Cup at Gillman.

With King's Lynn, Doolan won the Premier League Knockout Cup in both 2005 and 2006 and the Premier Trophy and the Premier League Championship in 2006. After also riding in the Elite League for Ipswich Witches and Eastbourne Eagles in 2005 and 2006 respectively, he made the move back to the top flight in 2007 with Belle Vue.

Doolan returned to King's Lynn in 2008 and won the 2008 Jack Young Solo Cup at Gillman, before signing for Workington Comets in 2009, captaining the team in a season in which they won the Premier League Four-Team Championship, but that for him was ended by a crash in September. In 2010 he returned to King's Lynn, and again his season ended early with a broken wrist sustained in July. After failing to agree terms with King's Lynn for 2011, he moved to Ipswich on a full transfer, becoming the team captain in the club's return to the Premier League. With Ipswich he won the Premier Fours for a second time in 2011. In July 2012 Doolan lost his place in the Witches team with Taylor Poole returning from injury. He subsequently signed for Redcar Bears. On 25 November 2012, it was announced that Doolan would ride for Leicester Lions for the 2013 Premier League season.

In 2014, Doolan signed for Berwick Bandits becoming captain in 2015 and 2016. He continued to ride for the Scottish club until his final season during the SGB Championship 2019. He announced his retirement after the season.

== World Final Appearances ==
=== Individual Under-21 World Championship ===
- 1999 - (Denmark) Vojens, Speedway Center - 12th - 6pts
- 2000 - (Poland) Gorzów Wielkopolski, Edward Jancarz Stadium - 14th - 4pts
