= King's Lynn Stars =

British speedway team

Club information
- Track address: Adrian Flux Arena; Saddlebow Road; King's Lynn; Norfolk
- Country: England
- Founded: 1965
- Promoter: Keith Chapman, Dale Allitt & Rob Lyon
- Team manager: Rob Lyon
- League: SGB Premiership
- Website: www.kingslynn-speedway.com

Club facts
- Colours: Blue, Yellow
- Track size: 342 metres (374 yd)
- Track record time: 57.60 secs
- Track record date: 11 September 2002
- Track record holder: Nicki Pedersen

Current senior team
Rider	CMA
(Australia) Max Fricke	9.89
(England) Chris Harris	6.53
(Australia) Ben Cook	6.39
(Czech Republic) Jan Kvěch	6.91
(Italy) Paco Castagna	4.13
(England) Cooper Rushen	3.00
(England) Jody Scott	3.00 (RS)
Total	36.85

Current junior team
Rider	CMA
(England) Jake Mulford
(England) Simon Lambert
(England) Mickie Simpson
(England) Ollie Binns
(England) Connor King
(England) Jacob Clouting
(England) Kenzie Cossey

Major team honours
Knockout Cup Winners	1977, 2000
Premier League Champions	2006, 2009
Div 2 KO Cup Winners	2005, 2006, 2007, 2009
Premier Trophy Winners	2006, 2007, 2009
Young Shield Winners	2005
Spring Gold Cup	1973
Gauntlet Gold Cup	1980
Inter League Knockout Cup	1978, 1980
SGB Premiership Pairs	2017
Midland Development League Champions	2015

King's Lynn Stars are a motorcycle speedway team who compete in the SGB Premiership. The nickname "Stars" was adopted from the defunct Norwich Stars team. The team was founded in 1965 and has been running continually since then, except for 1996 when King's Lynn failed to have a team competing in the British league system.

== History ==
=== 1960s ===
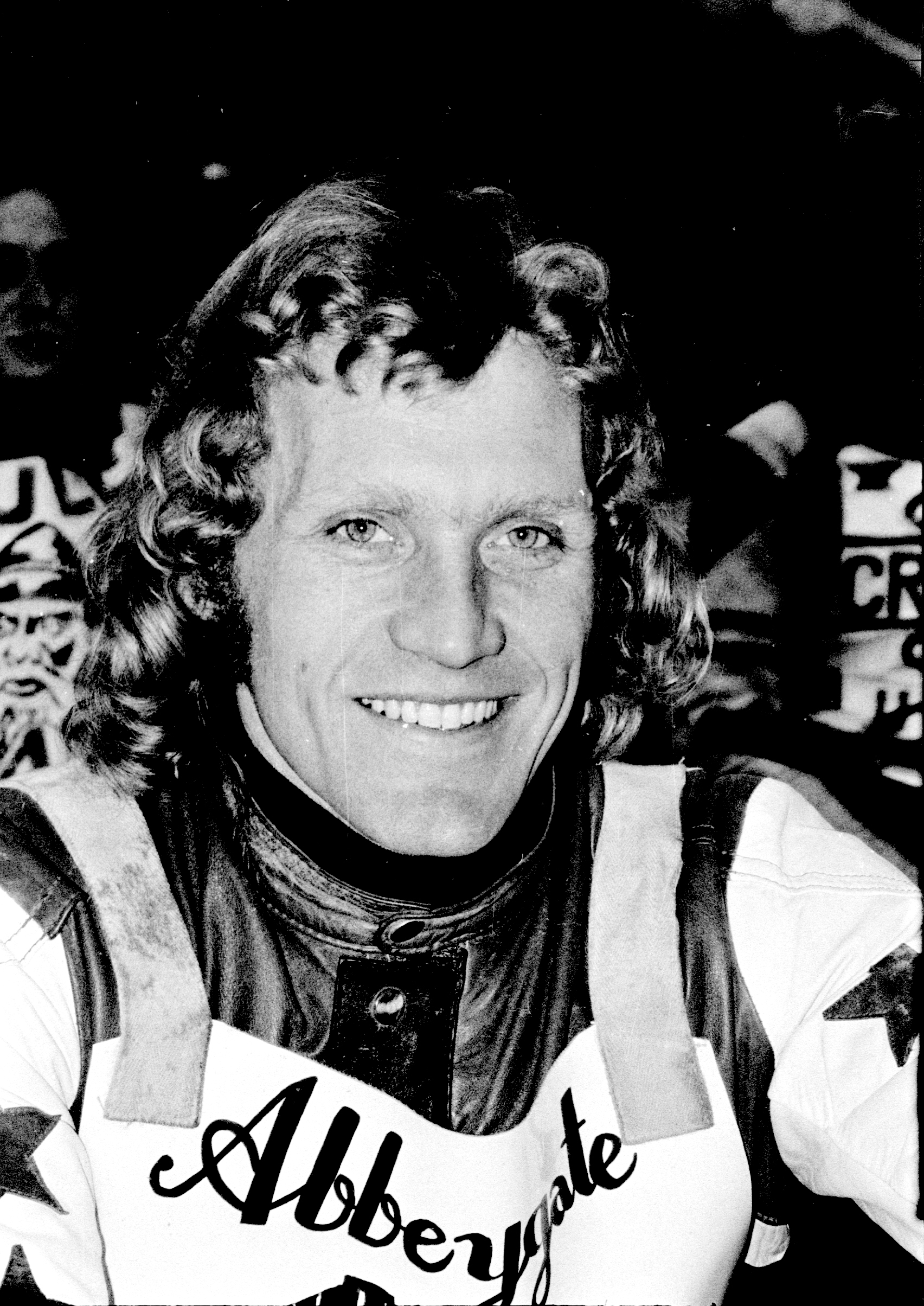
Terry Betts

Plans for speedway in King's Lynn surfaced in 1965, when Maurice Littlechild promoted on an open licence at King's Lynn Stadium. Littlechild had plans to create a team called the South Lynn Stars named after the Norwich Stars, who had closed in 1964. The first meeting was on 23 May 1965 and the South Lynn Stars name was dropped in favour of the King's Lynn Stars.

The team's inaugural league season was the 1966 British League season, where they finished 16th from 19 teams. The team was led by new signing Terry Betts, who recorded a season average of 9.41. After finishing last in 1967 they signed Malcolm Simmons from West Ham Hammers but experienced another poor season before improving to a ninth place finish in the league during 1969.

=== 1970s ===
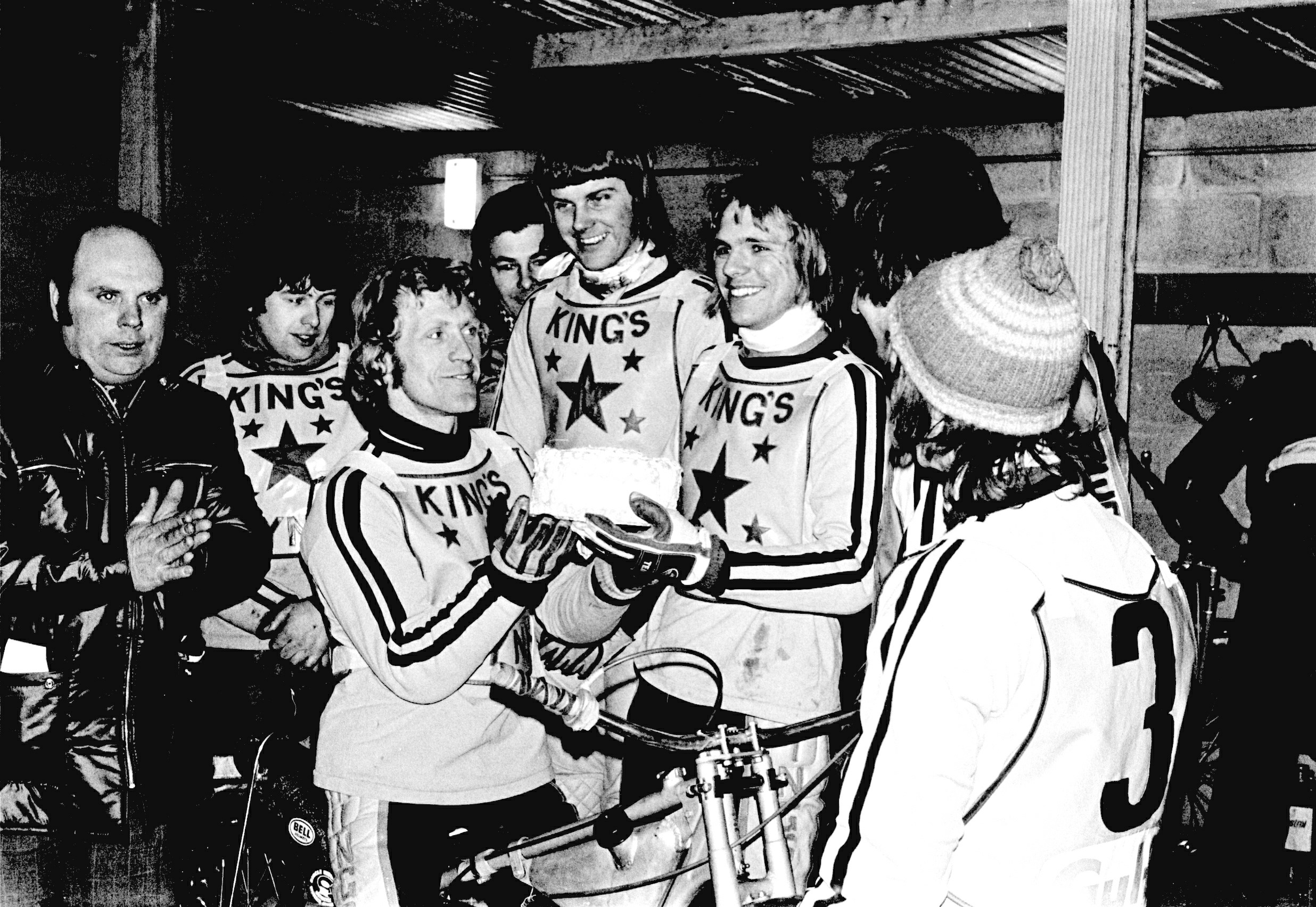
The team celebrate terry bett's birthday in 1976

After a tough start to the 1970s, King's Lynn managed two consecutive third place finishes during the 1972 and 1973 seasons, with their strongest riders being Terry Betts and Malcolm Simmons and well supported by Howard Cole and Phil Crump.

Ian Turner and Michael Lee were added to the team but it was not until 1977 that the first silverware was won by the team. The Knockout Cup win included a narrow two point win over Reading Racers on aggregate in the final, thanks largely to Lee and Betts. The following season in 1978, they won the Inter League Knock-out Cup. In 1979, Dave Jessup transferred from Reading to King's Lynn and set a new British transfer record of £20,000 at the time.

=== 1980s ===
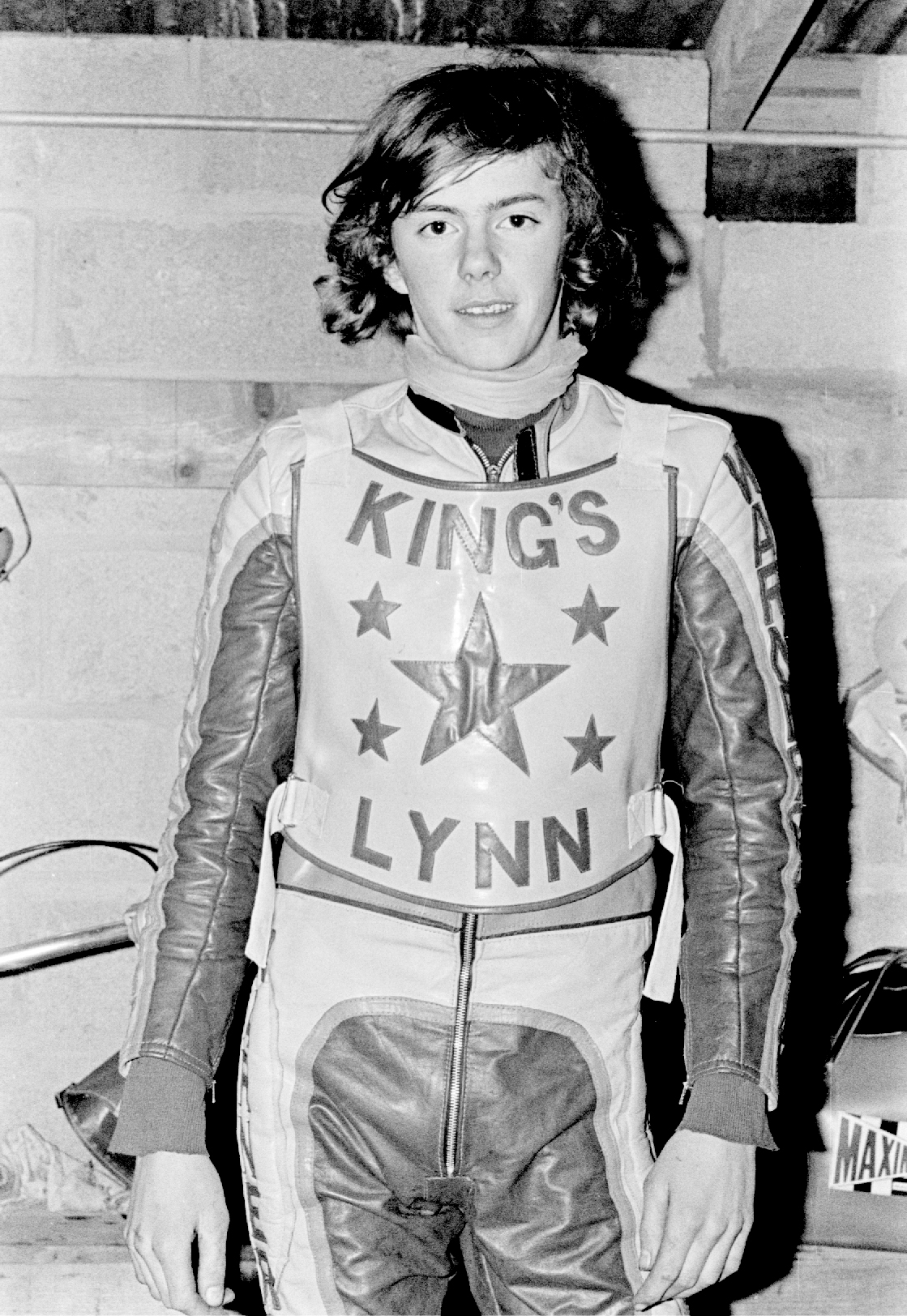
Michael Lee

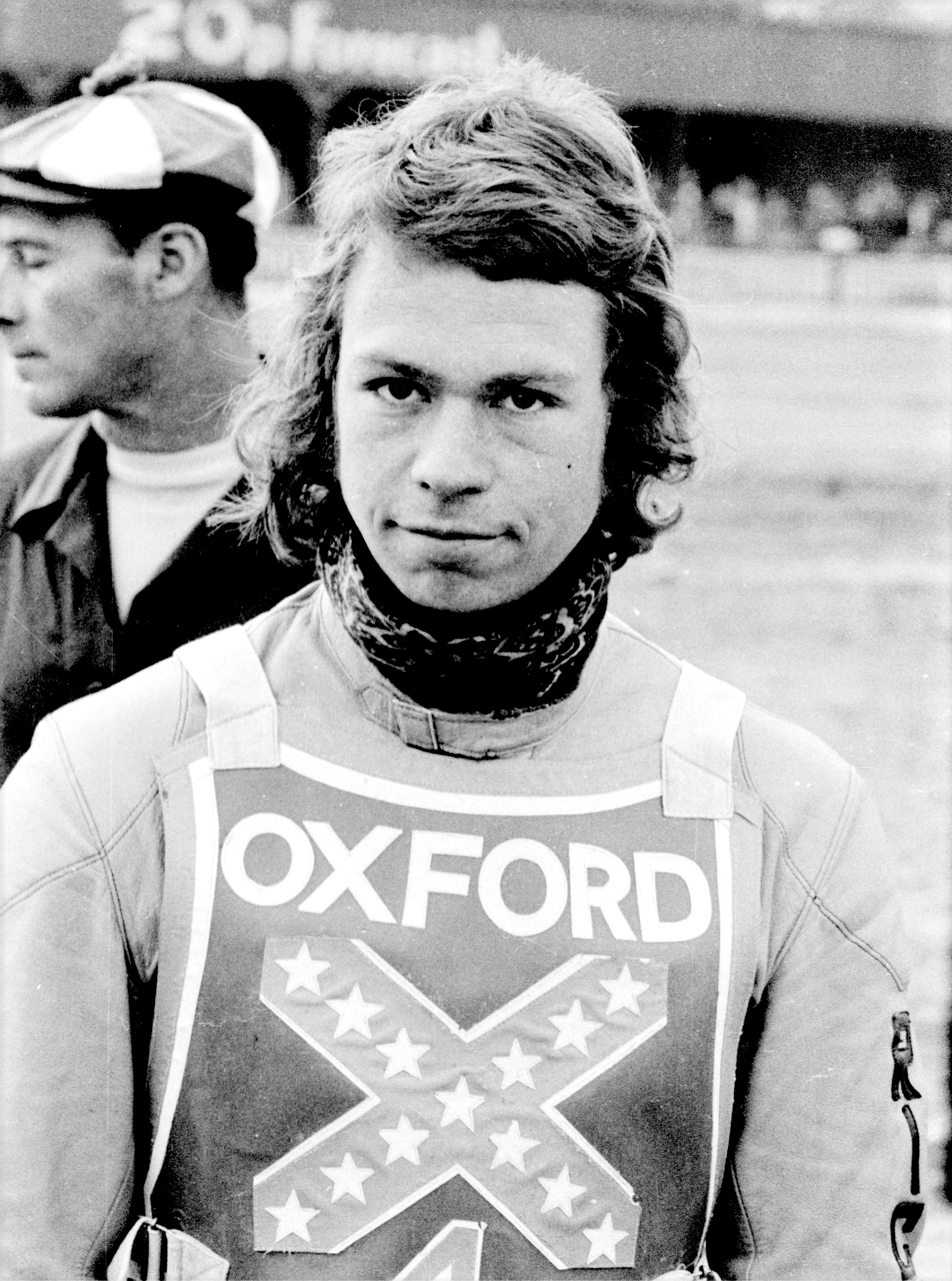
Richard Hellsen

The team secured a second Inter League Knock-out Cup win 1980 and Michael Lee was crowned world champion. Dave Jessup emerged as a rider to match Michael Lee for the Stars and Richard Hellsen was a popular rider with the fans.

The team were starved of success throughout the 1980s and co-promoter Cyril Crane (a former Norwich and Sheffield rider) came under criticism during the period.

=== 1990s ===
The team continued to compete in the highest division until the end of the 1995 season but failed to finish any higher than fourth place. Riders included Mark Loram, Richard Knight and Henka Gustaffson.

The team colours were originally green and yellow, taken directly from the Norwich Stars but in 1994 the green was replaced with blue, to match the blue and yellow of the King's Lynn official town crest. During their time as the Knights, silver and black became the prominent colours, but since reviving the Stars nickname they returned to using blue and yellow.

In 1997, the team returned to league action after missing the 1996 season, they joined the Elite League and were known as the King's Lynn Knights from 1997 to 2001. The Czech pair of Bohumil Brhel and Tomáš Topinka became fan's favourites. A junior side were introduced in 1998 and competed under various names in the following seasons, including the Starlets, Braves, Kids and Young Stars.

=== 2000s ===
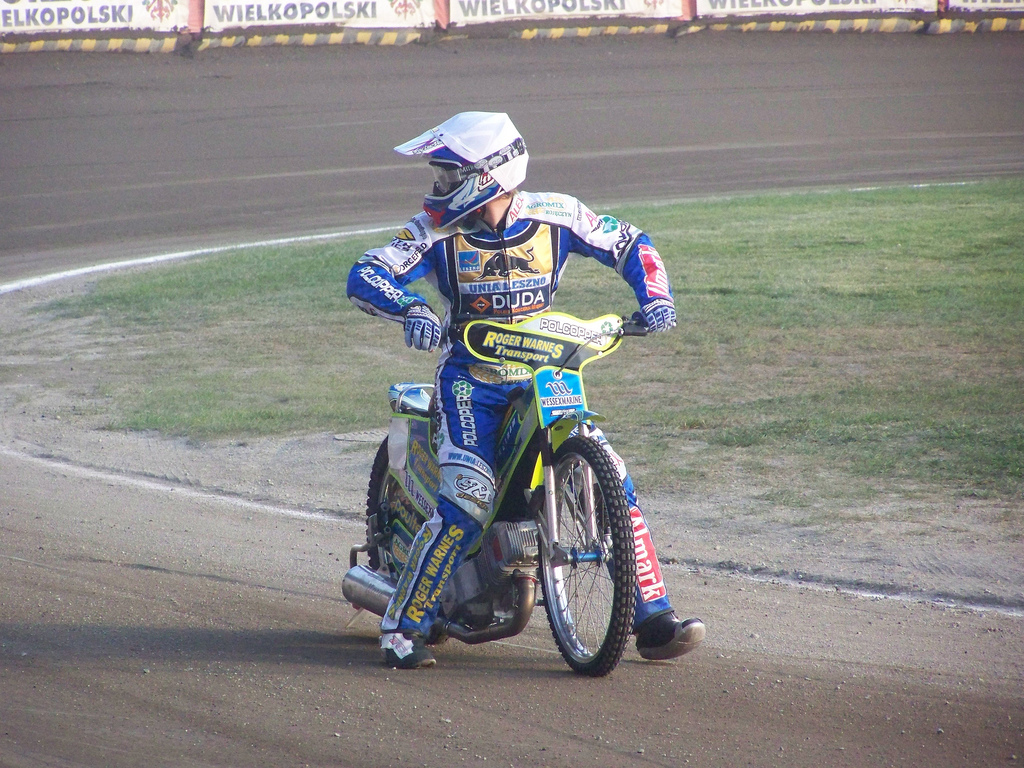
Troy Batchelor helped King's Lynn win the treble in 2006

During the 2000 Elite League speedway season the team finished runner-up behind Eastbourne Eagles and won the Knockout Cup for the second time. The Stars pairing of Australian's Leigh Adams and Jason Crump topped the league averages. Adams left for Oxford in 2001 and the Stars brought in Nicki Pedersen and in 2002, the club became the King's Lynn Silver Machine for one season before reverting to their traditional name of the Stars. For the first time in their 36-year history, the team dropped to the second division (Premier League) from 2003.

After winning the Knockout Cup (tier 2) in 2005, they finished top of the Premier League table in 2006 but were the first such team not automatically crowned champions because it was the first season that the Premier League used the play-off system to decide the championship. However, the Stars beat the Sheffield Tigers in the play off final to be crowned champions. King's Lynn Stars also won the 2006 Premier Trophy and the 2006 Premier League Knockout Cup completing the treble for the year. Much of the success was down to Tomáš Topinka, Kevin Doolan and Troy Batchelor.

In 2007, the Stars once again won the Premier Trophy and Premier League Knock-out Cup. They also finished top of the Premier League table but that year the Stars were beaten by the Sheffield Tigers in the play-off semi-final. In 2008, the Stars eventually finished third in the league. They then participated in the play-off promotion battle, where they lost on aggregate to Edinburgh Monarchs in the final. In 2009, for the second time in three years, the Stars won the treble: the first club ever to achieve this feat twice. The Stars were crowned league champions on 16 September 2009 but then lost on aggregate to the Edinburgh Monarchs in the promotion play-off final. The Stars also won the Premier Trophy on 30 September beating the Edinburgh Monarchs 99–92 on aggregate over two legs and in October the Stars won the Knock-Out Cup, beating the same Edinburgh Monarchs again on aggregate over two legs. In total from 2005 to 2009 they won four knockout cups and two league titles.

=== 2010s ===
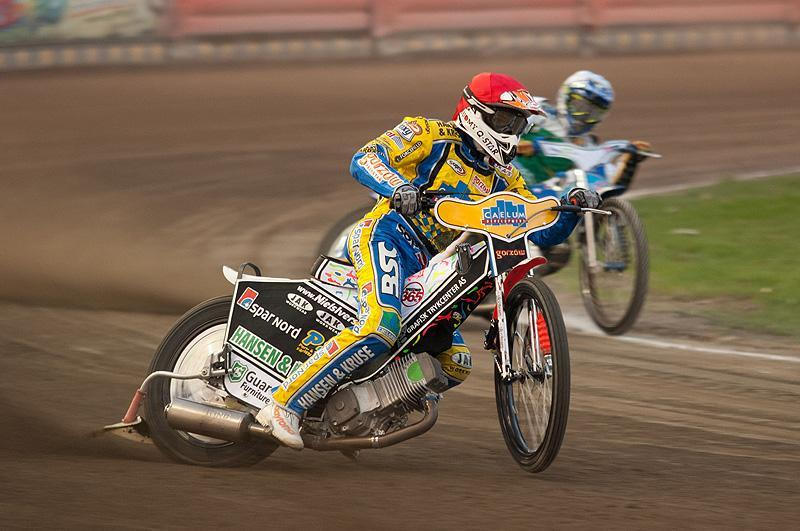
Niels Kristian Iversen in action

The 2011 season saw King's Lynn Stars return to the Elite League, marking a return to the top flight of speedway. Only Tomáš Topinka and Olly Allen were kept on the squad, with the rest of the team brought in from other Elite squads. The Stars proved very competitive home and away and finished third in the League and qualified for the playoffs, where they lost to the Poole Pirates in the semi-finals. They continued to compete in the Elite League and finished 2nd in 2014, when headed by Niels Kristian Iversen.

During the SGB Premiership 2018 the club just failed to win the highest league title, to have won it would have been the first time in the club's history. They topped the regular season table but lost in the play off final to Poole Pirates. Robert Lambert topped scored for the Stars and was well supported by Iversen.

=== 2020s ===
Following a season lost to the COVID-19 pandemic the team had a poor 2021 but reached the League Cup final in 2022. In June 2023, the club signed former world champion Artem Laguta for his first season in British speedway but the season disintegrated with Laguta unable to perform on the track and the team finished last. A complete revamp ensued for 2024, which included Niels Kristian Iversen's return and the mid-season signing of Czech rider Jan Kvěch.

In 2025, the club ran a junior team for the first time in eight years and the Young Stars won the National Trophy.

== Season summary (1st team) ==
Extended content

Year and league	Position	Notes
1966 British League season	16th	
1967 British League season	19th	
1968 British League season	18th	
1969 British League season	9th	
1970 British League season	12th	
1971 British League season	13th	
1972 British League season	3rd	
1973 British League season	3rd	
1974 British League season	5th	
1975 British League season	12th	
1976 British League season	14th	
1977 British League season	6th	Knockout Cup winners
1978 British League season	13th	
1979 British League season	4th	
1980 British League season	7th	
1981 British League season	14th	
1982 British League season	14th	
1983 British League season	8th	
1984 British League season	6th	
1985 British League season	11th	
1986 British League season	11th	
1987 British League season	12th	
1988 British League season	9th	
1989 British League season	9th	
1990 British League season	9th	
1991 British League season	8th	
1992 British League season	9th	
1993 British League season	9th	
1994 British League season	5th	
1995 Premier League speedway season	19th	
1997 Elite League speedway season	5th	Knights
1998 Elite League speedway season	9th	Knights
1999 Elite League speedway season	3rd	Knights
2000 Elite League speedway season	2nd	Knights, Knockout Cup winners
2001 Elite League speedway season	6th	Knights
2002 Elite League speedway season	9th	Silver Machine
2003 Premier League speedway season	6th	
2004 Premier League speedway season	7th	
2005 Premier League speedway season	4th	Knockout Cup winners
2006 Premier League speedway season	1st	Champions & Knockout Cup winner
2007 Premier League speedway season	1st	PO semi final & Knockout Cup winner
2008 Premier League speedway season	3rd	
2009 Premier League speedway season	1st	Champions & Knockout Cup winner
2010 Premier League speedway season	7th	
2011 Elite League speedway season	3rd	
2012 Elite League speedway season	7th	
2013 Elite League speedway season	5th	
2014 Elite League speedway season	2nd	PO semi final
2015 Elite League speedway season	5th	
2016 Elite League speedway season	6th	
SGB Premiership 2017	7th	
SGB Premiership 2018	1st	lost PO final
SGB Premiership 2019	6th	
SGB Premiership 2021	6th	
SGB Premiership 2022	5th	
SGB Premiership 2023	7th	
SGB Premiership 2024	6th	
SGB Premiership 2025	5th	

== Season summary (Junior team) ==
Extended content

Year and league	Position	Notes
1969 British League Division Two season	16th	Starlets
1997 Speedway Conference League	13th	Anglian Angels (with Ipswich)
1998 Speedway Conference League	4th	Norfolk Braves
1999 Speedway Conference League	7th	Braves
2002 Speedway Conference League	9th	Kids
2012 National League speedway season	8th	Young Stars
2013 National League speedway season	2nd	Young Stars
2014 National League speedway season	5th	Young Stars
2015 National League speedway season	6th	Young Stars
2016 National League speedway season	7th	Young Stars
2017 National League speedway season	N/A	Young Stars withdrew
2025 National Trophy	1st	Young Stars, Champions

== Notable riders ==
- (England) Terry Betts
- (England) Dave Jessup
- (England) Ian Turner
- (England) Malcolm Simmons
- (England) David Gagen
- (England) Richard Knight
- (England) Michael Lee
- (England) Mark Loram
- (England) Robert Lambert
- (England) Chris Harris
- (Wales) Howard Cole
- (Czech Republic) Bohumil Brhel
- (Czech Republic) Tomáš Topinka
- (Czech Republic) Jan Kvěch
- (Poland) Piotr Protasiewicz
- (Australia) Shane Parker
- (Australia) Jason Crump
- (Australia) Leigh Adams
- (Australia) Darcy Ward
- (Australia) Troy Batchelor
- (Australia) Kevin Doolan
- (Australia) Max Fricke
- (Sweden) Richard Hellsen
- (Sweden) Henka Gustafsson
- (Sweden) Tony Rickardsson
- (Denmark) Nicki Pedersen
- (Denmark) Niels Kristian Iversen
