= Glenn Cunningham (speedway rider) =

English speedway rider

- Born: 10 June 1975 (age 51); Bristol, England
- Nationality: British (English)

Career history

Great Britain
- 1991–1992, 1998: Oxford Cheetahs
- 1993–1996, 1998–1999, 2004: Swindon Robins
- 1997, 2006: Reading Racers
- 1998, 2000: Peterborough Panthers
- 2001: Newport Wasps
- 2002–2006: Somerset Rebels
- 2007: Stoke Potters

Sweden
- 2000: Valsarna

Individual honours
- 1997: Long Track World Championship bronze medal
- 1998, 1999, 2000, 2003: British Championship finalist
- 1994: World Under 21 finalist
- 1998: Premier League Riders' champion

Team honours
- 1998, 2005: Premier League Four-Team Championship

Glenn Arthur Cunningham (born 10 June 1975 in Bristol) is a former International speedway rider who rode for the various clubs in the British Premier League.

== Speedway career ==
Cunningham started his career with Oxford Cheetahs in 1991 and has since ridden for the Swindon Robins, Reading Racers, Peterborough Panthers, Newport Wasps, Belle Vue Aces, Eastbourne Eagles and Somerset Rebels.

In 1997, Cunningham won the bronze medal in the 1997 Individual Long Track World Championship.

In 1998, Cunningham reached the Overseas Final and finished on the podium in third place. He also won the Premier League Championship, the Premier League Riders Championship, held on 13 September at Owlerton Stadium, the Premier League Fours and the Premier League Pairs (partnering Brett Woodifield) with his club side, Peterborough Panthers. To cap his best ever season he was selected to ride for England against Australia at Eastbourne.

Cunningham was part of the Somerset Rebels four who won the Premier League Four-Team Championship, held on 20 August 2005, at Derwent Park.

At retirement, Cunningham had earned two international caps for the England national speedway team.

== Honours ==
- Premier League Riders Champion 1998, (Runner-up) 1997
- Premier League Champions 1997 (Reading Racers), 1998 (Peterborough Panthers)
- Premier League Fours Champion 1998 (Peterborough Panthers), 2005 (Somerset Rebels)
- Premier League Champion 1998 with Brett Woodifield (Peterborough Panthers)

== World Longtrack Championship ==
Grand-Prix Years

- 1997 - Five apps - 76pts (3rd)
- 1988 - Four apps - 53pts (7th)
- 1999 - Five apps - 47pts (10th)
- 2000 - Five apps - 36pts (11th)
- 2001 - Four apps - 29pts (13th)
- 2002 - Three apps - 7pts (20th)

Best Individual G.P. Results

First

- (Netherlands) Aduard 1997

Third

- (Germany) Scheeßel 1998
- (France) Marmande 1998
