= Hull Vikings =

1971 speedway team from Hull, England

Club information
- Track address: The Boulevard Stadium and Craven Park; Hull
- Country: England
- Founded: 1971
- Closed: 2005

Club facts
- Colours: Blue and White
- Track size: 346 metres (378 yd)
- Track record time: 64.4 seconds
- Track record date: 30 June 2004
- Track record holder: Magnus Karlsson

Major team honours
Premier League Champions	2004
Premier League KO Cup	2001, 2004
Craven Shield Winners	2004
Inter League Fours Winners	1979

The Hull Vikings were a speedway team from Hull, England, who operated from 1971 to 2005, primarily from The Boulevard (stadium) and Craven Park.

== History ==
=== Origins, 1940s and Hull Angels ===
Speedway in Hull began in 1948 when a corporation backed application was lodged with the Speedway Control Board. The team was managed by Fred Archer and the team wore the crest of the city's coat-of-arms (3 golden crowns on a blue shield and yellow background). The team were based at Hedon Stadium in Hedon on the outskirts of Hull. Their inaugural league season was in the 1948 Speedway National League Division Three where they finished 9th.

On 27 August 1949, the Angels raced their last match at home to Liverpool Chads and then after one more away match they withdrew from the league to be replaced by Swindon Robins. The speedway promotion applied, without success, to Hull City FC to see if they could use their old Anlaby Road ground.

=== 1970s ===
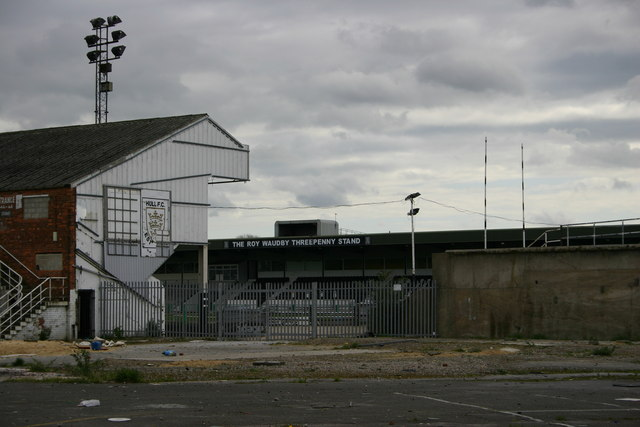
The Boulevard hosted the Vikings from 1971

In 1971, promoter Ian Thomas brought speedway back to Hull, when the Vikings began to race at the Boulevard Stadium, a 380 metres (420 yards) circumference track. The initial plan to call the team the Hull Kestrels was scrapped. The Vikings raced during the 1971 British League Division Two season. The Boulevard was famous as the long time home of Rugby Football League team Hull FC. During the years of racing at The Boulevard, the Vikings had the dubious distinction of being the last league speedway team ever to appear at the famous West Ham Stadium, on 23 May 1972, when they beat the closing West Ham Hammers 40–38.

After three seasons in division 2 they applied for and gained division 1 status for the 1974 British League season. The team struggled from 1974 to 1977 despite riders over the four seasons including the likes of Joe Owen, Scots pair Jim McMillan and Bobby Beaton and former multiple world champion Barry Briggs. In 1978 they signed the legendary New Zealander Ivan Mauger, a five times world champion at the time and a young American rider Kelly Moran and the team finished third in the league during 1978.

The Vikings just missed out on becoming British champions during the 1979 British League season, led by Mauger and with solid contributions from Beaton, Moran, Owen, Dennis Sigalos, Graham Drury and Frank Auffret, the team lost by just two points from Coventry Bees. The 1979 season also saw Mauger become the world champion for a record sixth time.

=== 1980s ===
A sudden decline in form and attendances during 1980 and 1981 was overshadowed when Hull FC announced that they were revoking the Boulevard's speedway licence, leaving promoters Ian Thomas and Brian Larner without a track.

=== 1990s ===
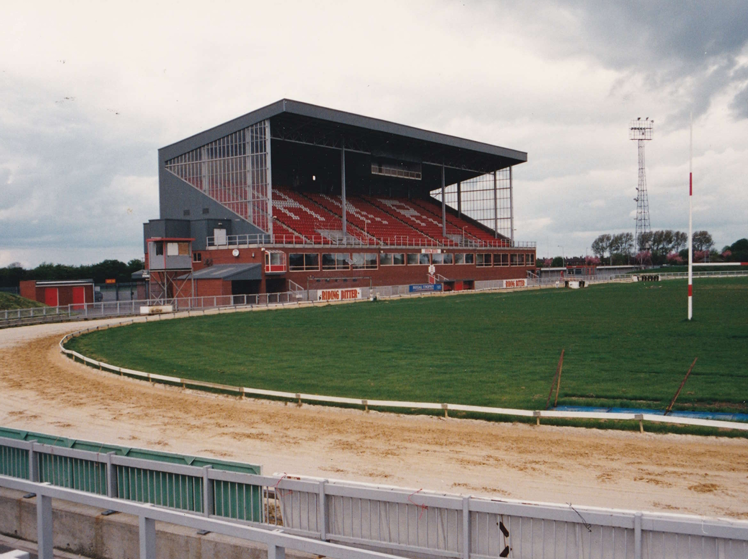
Craven Park was the third venue in Hull to host speedway

In 1995, a speedway track was constructed at Craven Park, the home of the city's other rugby league team, Hull Kingston Rovers. The 346 metres (378 yards) long speedway track built by Glyn Taylor ran inside the greyhound racing track. The stadium had opened only six years previous and the Vikings signed Paul Thorp and Jan Stæchmann to spearhead the team. On 5 April 1995, the first race took place.

When the Elite League was introduced in 1997, Hull chose to compete in the second tier of British speedway for the 1997 and 1998 seasons before competing in the top division during the 1999 Elite League speedway season.

=== 2000s ===
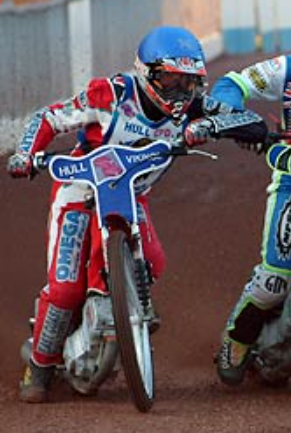
Paul Thorp

Garry Stead

Major changes took place for the 2000 season, with the Vikings choosing to drop back down to the Premier League. Paul Thorp was well supported by Garry Stead as the team competed for the league title before finally finishing 3rd. The following season the Vikings finished runner-up to Newcastle Diamonds and won the Knockout Cup.

In 2004, Paul Hodder took over the club from Nigel Wordsworth and the Vikings signed Magnus Karlsson to support Thorp and Stead. The team swept the board by winning the Premier League title, Knockout Cup and Young Shield.

However, just one year later in 2005, the club were told by landlords Hull Kingston Rovers that they would have to pay £75,000 in order to move the speedway track in order for the rugby pitch to be widened. This and other financial issues ultimately resulted in the Vikings being disbanded after the 2005 season.

=== The future ===
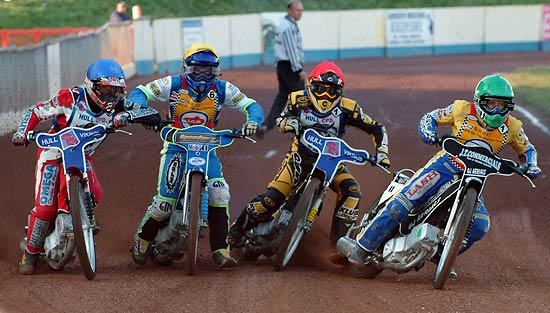
Hull vs Isle of Wight, Craven Park 11 May 2005

The prospect of speedway returning to Hull would require a new venue to be built as The Boulevard was closed in 2009 and demolished, and in 2010 Craven Park was redeveloped after the Vikings' departure, with the speedway track removed and the ground becoming a rectangular sports venue suited to rugby league.

== Season summary ==
Extended content

Year and league	Position	Notes
1948 Speedway National League Division Three	9th	as Hull Angels
1949 Speedway National League Division Three	N/A	replaced by Swindon Robins
1971 British League Division Two season	6th	
1972 British League Division Two season	8th	
1973 British League Division Two season	12th	
1974 British League season	16th	
1975 British League season	14th	
1976 British League season	12th	
1977 British League season	14th	
1978 British League season	3rd	
1979 British League season	2nd	
1980 British League season	12th	
1981 British League season	12th	
1995 Premier League speedway season	16th	
1996 Premier League speedway season	7th	
1997 Premier League speedway season	9th	
1998 Premier League speedway season	4th	
1999 Elite League speedway season	7th	
2000 Premier League speedway season	3rd	
2001 Premier League speedway season	2nd	Knockout Cup div 2 winners
2002 Premier League speedway season	5th	
2003 Premier League speedway season	18th	
2004 Premier League speedway season	1st	champions & Knockout Cup, Young Shield
2005 Premier League speedway season	13th	

== Notable riders ==
- (Scotland) Bobby Beaton
- (New Zealand) Barry Briggs
- (Wales) Graham Drury
- (Sweden) Magnus Karlsson
- (Scotland) Jim McMillan
- (New Zealand) Ivan Mauger
- (United States) Kelly Moran
- (United States) Shawn Moran
- (West Germany) Egon Müller
- (England) Joe Owen
- (Australia) Billy Sanders
- (United States) Dennis Sigalos
- (England) Garry Stead
- (England) Paul Thorp
- (England) Reg Wilson
