= Scott Robson =

English speedway rider

- Born: 15 August 1971 (age 55); Sunderland, England
- Nationality: British (English)

Career history
- 1987–1992, 1998, 2001: Berwick Bandits
- 1993–1994: Newcastle Diamonds
- 1995–1996: Middlesbrough Bears
- 1997: Hull Vikings
- –1998, 2003: Eastbourne Eagles
- 1999–2000, 2002–2003: Coventry Bees
- 2002–2004: Rye House Rockets
- 2002, 2004: Belle Vue Aces
- 2005: Workington Comets

Individual honours
- 1995: British Championship finalist

Scott Robson (born 15 August 1971) is a former international speedway rider from England.

== Speedway career ==
Robson rode in the top tier of British Speedway from 1987 to 2005, riding for various clubs. He started his career at Berwick Bandits and went on to ride for Newcastle Diamonds, Middlesbrough Bears, Hull Vikings, Eastbourne Eagles, Coventry Bees, Rye House Rockets, Belle Vue Aces and Workington Comets.

Robson reached the final of the British Speedway Championship in 1995. In 2000, he was voted the Rider of the Year for Coventry.

== Family ==
Robson's brother Stuart is also a speedway rider, as was his father John Robson.
