= 2004 Premier League speedway season =

British motorcycle speedway season

- League: Premier League
- Champions: Hull Vikings
- Knockout Cup: Hull Vikings
- Young Shield: Hull Vikings
- Premier Trophy: Exeter Falcons
- Individual: Andre Compton
- Pairs: Reading Racers
- Fours: Workington Comets
- Highest average: Jason Lyons
- Division/s above: 2004 Elite League
- Division/s below: 2004 Conference League

The 2004 Premier League speedway season was the second division of speedway in the United Kingdom and governed by the Speedway Control Board (SCB), in conjunction with the British Speedway Promoters' Association (BSPA).

== Season summary ==
The League consisted of 15 teams for the 2004 season after the Swindon Robins and Arena Essex Hammers elected to compete in the Elite League and the closure of the Trelawny Tigers.

The League was run on a standard format with no play-offs and was won by Hull Vikings.

== League ==
=== Final table ===
Pos		M	W	D	L	F	A	Pts	Bon	Tot
1	Hull Vikings	28	23	0	5	1445	1166	46	12	58
2	Workington Comets	28	18	1	9	1425	1179	37	12	49
3	Reading Racers	28	17	0	11	1389.5	1228.5	34	12	46
4	Stoke Potters	28	15	0	13	1328	1268	30	9	39
5	Isle of Wight Islanders	28	13	2	13	1370	1240	28	10	38
6	Rye House Rockets	28	16	0	12	1243	1353	32	5	37
7	King's Lynn Stars	28	14	0	14	1321	1281	28	7	35
8	Sheffield Tigers	28	14	0	14	1344	1252	28	6	34
9	Berwick Bandits	28	13	0	15	1282	1337	26	7	33
10	Exeter Falcons	28	13	0	15	1306.5	1306.5	26	6	32
11	Glasgow Tigers	28	12	0	16	1282	1310	24	8	32
12	Edinburgh Monarchs	28	12	0	16	1282	1319	24	5	29
13	Somerset Rebels	28	12	1	15	1246	1361	25	4	29
14	Newport Wasps	28	7	2	19	1127	1450	16	1	17
15	Newcastle Diamonds	28	8	0	20	1133	1473	16	1	17

=== Fixtures and results ===
Home \ Away	BER	ED	EX	GLA	HV	IOW	KL	ND	NW	RR	RYE	SHE	SOM	STO	WOR
Berwick Bandits		57–38	55–41	45–44	42–42	48–45	65–29	59–35	54–40	48–45	53–42	57–37	53–42	48–49	49–44
Edinburgh Monarchs	60–36		49–41	57–37	43–47	62–32	55–38	65–27	55–41	47–42	44–46	54–39	55–39	64–20	53–43
Exeter Falcons	49–41	61–33		54–39	50–45	54–40	55–38	64–32	65–27	48.5–47.5	75–18	59–36	62–31	43–50	56–39
Glasgow Tigers	57–37	50–45	61–34		43–47	58–34	56–38	59–35	54–40	51–45	48–47	51–42	54–42	54–39	44–46
Hull Vikings	54–40	49–46	65–27	62–31		48–46	62–33	60–31	61–35	46–44	62–32	54–40	55–38	50–46	46–44
Isle of Wight Islanders	56–37	65–31	63–31	53–42	44–49		66–29	53–38	63–29	55–40	63–32	57–35	62–31	50–44	45–45
King's Lynn Stars	61–35	63–32	64–29	41–28	50–42	57–39		66–26	62–33	49–47	57–38	56–36	61–33	67–27	52–42
Newcastle Diamonds	43–51	49–43	49–45	49–47	34–60	46–49	57–39		49–32	47–48	45–48	52–44	47–43	50–43	43–51
Newport Wasps	51–44	50–43	46–44	53–39	38–58	45–45	50–44	46–44		50–43	42–47	43–46	45–45	41–54	44–46
Reading Racers	59–32	55–39	58–36	53–44	51–39	48–42	56–39	57–38	48–42		49–43	50–45	52–38	61–33	56–37
Rye House Rockets	48–42	50–40	45–44	51–41	44–51	52–41	58–35	56–36	51–39	49–44		52–42	49–41	50–45	56–39
Sheffield Tigers	55–38	65–27	57–38	55–41	52–38	55–39	56–38	67–26	65–26	51–46	69–25		54–42	44–33	44–46
Somerset Rebels	51–41	61–33	55–39	46–44	44–53	45–45	49–41	51–43	59–34	42–52	52–40	51–39		50–43	54–41
Stoke Potters	55–39	51–39	57–36	52–40	42–52	56–38	55–38	58–37	57–37	41–49	56–40	62–30	62–32		56–37
Workington Comets	60–33	65–30	66–26	68–25	53–43	49–41	54–36	69–25	65–28	57–39	58–34	51–44	58–35	52–42	

Legend: Blue = home team win; Yellow = draw; Red = away team win.

== Premier League Knockout Cup ==
The 2004 Premier League Knockout Cup was the 37th edition of the Knockout Cup for tier two teams. Hull Vikings were the winners of the competition.

First round

Date	Team one	Score	Team two
12/05	Hull	59-36	Berwick
24/07	Berwick	42-42	Hull
31/05	Exeter	53-19	Newport
22/07	Newport	46-50	Exeter
11/05	Isle of Wight	63-29	King's Lynn
12/05	King's Lynn	56-39	Isle of Wight
15/05	Rye House	55-39	Newcastle
16/05	Newcastle	41-49	Rye House
15/05	Workington	57-35	Edinburgh
14/05	Edinburgh	50-43	Workington
14/05	Somerset	48-42	Stoke
15/05	Stoke	44-46	Somerset
10/05	Reading	52-43	Glasgow
09/05	Glasgow	47-43	Reading

Quarter-finals

Date	Team one	Score	Team two
18/08	Hull	53-39	Reading
23/08	Reading	51-42	Hull
26/07	Exeter	62-29	Sheffield
22/07	Sheffield	57-37	Exeter
06/07	Isle of Wight	59-36	Rye House
31/07	Rye House	52-42	Isle of Wight
26/06	Workington	54-40	Somerset
25/06	Somerset	48-44	Workington

Semi-finals

Date	Team one	Score	Team two
06/10	Hull	62-35	Exeter
20/09	Exeter	57-34	Hull
02/09	Isle of Wight	56-38	Workington
18/09	Workington	43.5-46.5	Isle of Wight

=== Final ===
First leg

20 October 2004

Hull Vikings Garry Stead 15 Emil Kramer 11 Emiliano Sanchez 11 Magnus Karlsson 10 Paul Thorp 8 Joel Parsons 1 Ross Brady R/R	56 – 39	Isle of Wight Islanders Craig Boyce 11 Sebastian Trésarrieu 10 Ray Morton 6 Krister Marsh 6 Ulrich Østergaard 3 Jason Bunyan 2 Glenn Phillips 1

Craven Park, Hull

Second leg

26 October 2004

Isle of Wight Islanders Jason Bunyan 12 Craig Boyce 9 Krister Marsh 9 Sebastian Trésarrieu 7 Ray Morton 6 Ulrich Østergaard 5 Glenn Phillips 4	52 – 43	Hull Vikings Magnus Karlsson 12 Garry Stead 11 Paul Thorp 9 Emil Kramer 6 Emiliano Sanchez 4 Joel Parsons 1 Ross Brady R/R

Smallbrook Stadium

Hull were declared Knockout Cup Champions, winning on aggregate 99–91.

== Premier Trophy ==
North Group

Pos	Team	P	W	D	L	Pts
1	Glasgow	14	10	1	3	21
2	Sheffield	14	8	0	6	16
3	Edinburgh	14	8	0	6	16
4	Hull	14	8	0	6	16
5	Workington	14	7	0	7	14
6	Berwick	14	7	0	7	14
7	Stoke	14	6	1	7	13
8	Newcastle	14	1	0	13	2

South Group

Pos	Team	P	W	D	L	Pts
1	Exeter	12	8	0	4	16
2	Reading	12	7	1	4	15
3	Rye House	12	7	1	4	15
4	Somerset	11	6	1	4	13
5	King's Lynn	12	4	1	7	9
6	Isle of Wight	10	3	2	5	8
7	Newport	11	2	0	9	4

Home \ Away	BER	ED	GLA	HUL	NEW	SHE	STO	WOR
Berwick		48–45	42–48	52–42	66–27	47–43	49–44	58–36
Edinburgh	59–31		52–40	43–47	63–29	47–42	59–34	54–40
Glasgow	63–28	53–42		49–41	60–35	49–41	50–43	47–46
Hull	51–42	52–43	39–54		58–35	57–37	50–44	49–44
Newcastle	40–56	39–51	38–56	37–55		42–51	40–51	49–47
Sheffield	67–25	63–32	53–40	55–40	65–30		59–35	52–42
Stoke	54–36	47–48	45–45	50–45	61–31	54–38		48–44
Workington	60–32	50–46	59–35	58–35	58–33	55–40	54–41	

Legend: Blue = home team win; Yellow = draw; Red = away team win.

Home \ Away	EX	IOW	KL	NWP	REA	RYE	SOM
Exeter		59–33	65–29	63–29	48–45	67–26	60–35
Isle of Wight	45–44		65–28	n–h	45–45	54–42	n–h
King's Lynn	51–40	52–43		50–45	49–45	45–45	43–49
Newport	43–50	48–45	52–42		38–58	43–47	44–46
Reading	58–36	38–34	58–38	54–41		48–45	52–38
Rye House	51–42	47–42	58–37	66–27	56–37		49–44
Somerset	44–45	45–45	60–43	46–44	48–41	56–37	

Legend: Blue = home team win; Yellow = draw; Red = away team win.

Semi-final

Team one	Team two	Score
Glasgow	Reading	50–40, 36–57
Exeter	Sheffield	64–30, 38–56

Final

Team one	Team two	Score
Reading	Exeter	46–43, 35–59

== Young Shield ==
- End of season competition for the highest eight league teams

First Round

Team one	Team two	Score
King's Lynn	Workington	52–41, 41–55
Reading	Sheffield	58–34, 41–56
Rye House	Hull	47–44, 42–52
Stoke	Isle of Wight	52–40, 32–59

Semi-final

Team one	Team two	Score
Workington	Hull	52–44, 42–52
Isle of Wight	Reading	53–45, 42–51

Final

Team one	Team two	Score
Reading	Hull	41–52, 44–52

== Riders' Championship ==
Andre Compton won the Riders' Championship for the second time. The final was held on 19 September at Owlerton Stadium. Compton was awarded the title following a last bend crash in the final with Simon Stead, the latter was attributed as the cause of the crash.

Pos.	Rider	Pts	Total	SF	Final
1	(England) Andre Compton	2 3 3 2 0	10	3	3
2	(Australia) Mark Lemon	2 2 2 2 3	11	2	2
3	(England) Simon Stead	3 3 3 3 3	15	-	1
4	(Australia) Craig Boyce	2 1 3 3 2	11	-	ef
5	(Australia) Craig Watson	3 3 2 ex 2	11	1	
6	(England) Danny Bird	2 ex 3 1 3	9	0	
7	(England) Carl Stonehewer	3 2 1 3 ex	9		
8	(Czech Republic) Tomáš Topinka	1 3 1 0 3	8		
9	(Czech Republic) Adrian Rymel	0 2 2 3 0	7		
10	(Denmark) Jan Staechmann	1 2 2 1 1	7		
11	(Australia) Rory Schlein	3 1 - - -	4		
12	(Australia) Shane Parker	1 1 1 ex 1	4		
13	(England) Glenn Cunningham	ex 1 0 ex 2	3		
14	(Australia) Jason Lyons	ex ef 0 2 1	3		
15	(England) Chris Neath	ex ex 0 2 1	3		
16	(England) Luke Priest (res)	2 1	3		
17	(England) Paul Cooper (res)	1 0	1		
18	(Scotland) Ross Brady	ex ex - - -	0		

- f=fell, r-retired, ex=excluded, ef=engine failure t=touched tapes

== Pairs ==
The Premier League Pairs Championship was held at Smallmead Stadium on 20 June. The event was won by Reading (Danny Bird & Phil Morris) who beat Stoke (Paul Pickering & Alan Mogridge) in the final.

Group A
Pos	Team	Pts	Riders
1	Rye House		Neath, Robson
2	Glasgow		Parker, Stancl

Group B
Pos	Team	Pts	Riders
1	Reading		Bird, Morris
2	Stoke		Pickering, Mogridge

Other teams

- Berwick: Kristensen, Franc
- Exeter: Lemon, Stephens
- Isle of Wight: Boyce, Bunyan
- Sheffield: Ashworth, Compton
- Somerset: Fry, Cunningham
- Workington: Stonehewer, Collins

Semi finals

- Reading bt Glasgow 6–3
- Stoke bt Rye House 5–4

Final

- Reading bt Stoke 7–2

== Fours ==
Workington Comets won the Premier League Four-Team Championship, which was held on 21 August 2004, at Derwent Park.

Group A
Pos	Team	Pts	Riders
1	Workington	17	Stonehewer, Stead, Nieminen, Collins
2	Stoke	13	Pickering, Staechmann, Mogridge, Kessler
3	Reading	12	Zagar, Bird, Morris, Appleton
4	Berwick	6	Pietraszko, Rymel, Kristensen, Franc

Group B
Pos	Team	Pts	Riders
1	Glasgow	15	Parker, Stancl, Bentley, Grieves
2	Rye House	14	Werner, Neath, Watt, Robson
3	Hull	12	Karlsson, Brady, Stead, Kramer
4	Edinburgh	7	Schott, Carr, Schlein, Pijper

Final
Pos	Team	Pts	Riders
1	Workington	29	Stonehewer, Stead, Nieminen, Collins
2	Stoke	20	Pickering, Staechmann, Mogridge, Kessler
3	Glasgow	12	Parker, Stancl, Bentley, Grieves
4	Rye House	11	Werner, Neath, Watt, Robson

== Final leading averages ==
Rider	Team	Average
(Australia) Jason Lyons	Newcastle	10.13
(Slovenia) Matej Žagar	Reading	10.02
(England) Simon Stead	Workington	10.01
(England) Carl Stonehewer	Workington	9.84
(England) Sean Wilson	Sheffield	9.69
(England) Danny Bird	Reading	9.67
(Australia) Craig Watson	Newport	9.66
(Australia) Shane Parker	Glasgow	9.58
(Denmark) Frede Schött	Edinburgh	9.53
(Australia) Craig Boyce	Isle of Wight	9.47

== Riders & final averages ==
Berwick

- Adrian Rymel 7.62
- Michal Makovský 7.23
- Lee Smethills 7.19
- Claus Kristensen 6.80
- Adam Pietraszko 6.70
- Josef Franc 6.66
- Ritchie Hawkins 6.20
- Simon Cartwright 6.01
- David Meldrum 5.80
- Blair Scott 3.71
- Tom Brown 2.47

Edinburgh

- Frede Schott 9.53
- Rory Schlein 8.94
- Peter Carr 8.07
- Theo Pijper 6.48
- Matthew Wethers 5.26
- Cameron Woodward 4.64
- Sean Stoddart 1.22

Exeter

- Mark Lemon 9.39
- Graeme Gordon 7.74
- Roger Lobb 7.55
- Mark Simmonds 7.47
- Seemond Stephens 7.41
- Michael Coles 7.14
- Nick Simmons 3.61

Glasgow

- Shane Parker 9.58
- George Štancl 8.56
- James Grieves 8.11
- Paul Bentley 7.98
- Graham Jones 6.31
- Eric Carrillo 5.93
- David McAllan 4.09
- Corey Blackman 2.57
- James Cockle 2.08
- Barry Campbell 1.94

Hull

- Magnus Karlsson 8.50
- Garry Stead 7.92
- Paul Thorp 7.90
- Ross Brady 7.68
- Emil Kramer 7.60
- Emiliano Sanchez 7.45
- Joel Parsons 4.79
- Danny Norton 1.71

Isle of Wight

- Craig Boyce 9.47
- Jason Bunyan 7.67
- Sebastien Trésarrieu 7.53
- Ray Morton 6.82
- Krister Marsh 6.71
- Ulrich Østergaard 6.68
- Glen Phillips 6.24
- Chris Johnson 3.23

King's Lynn

- Tomáš Topinka 8.74
- Kevin Doolan 7.70
- Shaun Tacey 7.23
- Tom P. Madsen 6.86
- Adam Allott 6.75
- Paul Lee 6.53
- James Brundle 4.97
- Trevor Harding 4.00
- Darren Mallett 3.26

Newcastle

- Jason Lyons 10.13
- Richard Juul 6.16
- Kristian Lund 6.06
- Kevin Little 5.98
- Lee Dicken 5.39
- Lee Smethills 5.22
- Jamie Robertson 4.77
- William Lawson 4.03
- Scott Smith 3.81
- Luboš Tomíček Jr. 3.56

Newport

- Craig Watson 9.66
- Mads Korneliussen 6.95
- Kristian Lund 6.10
- Pavel Ondrašík 5.50
- Tony Atkin 5.32
- Carl Wilkinson 4.82
- Luke Priest 2.43
- Karl Mason 2.33
- Barrie Evans 2.26

Reading

- Matej Žagar 10.02
- Danny Bird 9.67
- Phil Morris 8.18
- Andrew Appleton 8.10
- Chris Schramm 5.01
- Chris Mills 4.51
- Steve Braidford 2.46
- Jamie Westacott 1.83

Rye House

- Davey Watt 8.43
- Brent Werner 8.18
- Chris Neath 7.71
- Scott Robson 7.02
- Steve Masters 6.46
- Tommy Allen 4.61
- Steve Boxall 4.07
- Luke Bowen 1.57

Sheffield

- Sean Wilson 9.69
- Andre Compton 8.92
- Ricky Ashworth 8.29
- Andrew Moore 7.39
- Richard Hall 5.48
- James Birkinshaw 5.28
- Ben Wilson 5.15

Somerset

- Glenn Cunningham 8.02
- John Jorgensen 7.96
- Paul Fry 7.48
- Neil Collins 6.72
- Jamie Smith 6.02
- Matt Read 5.23
- Steve Bishop 4.79
- Simon Walker 3.15

Stoke

- Jan Staechmann 9.04
- Paul Pickering 8.48
- Alan Mogridge 8.28
- Robbie Kessler 6.78
- Paul Clews 5.47
- Trent Leverington 5.06
- Rob Grant Jr. 3.89
- Daniel Giffard 2.51

Workington

- Simon Stead 10.01
- Carl Stonehewer 9.84
- Kauko Nieminen 6.92
- Rusty Harrison 6.66
- Brett Woodifield 6.15
- Aidan Collins 5.73
- James Wright 5.48

== See also ==
- List of United Kingdom Speedway League Champions
- Knockout Cup (speedway)
