= 2002 Premier League speedway season =

British motorcycle speedway season

- League: Premier League
- Champions: Sheffield Tigers
- Knockout Cup: Sheffield Tigers
- Premier Trophy: Trelawny Tigers
- Young Shield: Sheffield Tigers
- Individual: Adam Shields
- Pairs: Isle of Wight Islanders
- Fours: Berwick Bandits
- Highest average: Sean Wilson
- Division/s above: 2002 Elite League
- Division/s below: 2002 Conference League

The 2002 Premier League speedway season was the second division of speedway in the United Kingdom and governed by the Speedway Control Board (SCB), in conjunction with the British Speedway Promoters' Association (BSPA).

== Season summary ==
The League consisted of 17 teams for the 2002 season with the addition of two teams, the Rye House Rockets and the Somerset Rebels from the Conference League.

The League was run on a standard format with no play-offs and was won by Sheffield Tigers.

On 14 April, Lawrence Hare was paralysed after crashing while riding for Exeter Falcons.

== League ==
=== Final table ===
| Pos | | M | W | D | L | F | A | Pts | Bon | Tot |
| 1 | Sheffield Tigers | 32 | 20 | 1 | 11 | 1612 | 1267 | 41 | 15 | 56 |
| 2 | Newcastle Diamonds | 32 | 21 | 1 | 10 | 1501 | 1364 | 43 | 13 | 56 |
| 3 | Isle of Wight Islanders | 32 | 21 | 1 | 10 | 1541 | 1329 | 43 | 15 | 55 |
| 4 | Berwick Bandits | 32 | 17 | 3 | 12 | 1520 | 1360 | 37 | 12 | 49 |
| 5 | Hull Vikings | 32 | 19 | 0 | 13 | 1444 | 1419 | 38 | 11 | 49 |
| 6 | Swindon Robins | 32 | 17 | 2 | 13 | 1473 | 1408 | 36 | 10 | 46 |
| 7 | Stoke Potters | 32 | 17 | 1 | 14 | 1453 | 1423 | 35 | 8 | 43 |
| 8 | Reading Racers | 32 | 17 | 0 | 15 | 1427 | 1448 | 34 | 7 | 41 |
| 9 | Edinburgh Monarchs | 32 | 14 | 4 | 14 | 1425 | 1450 | 35 | 8 | 40 |
| 10 | Exeter Falcons | 32 | 14 | 0 | 18 | 1463 | 1415 | 28 | 10 | 38 |
| 11 | Arena Essex Hammers | 32 | 13 | 3 | 15 | 1417 | 1456 | 29 | 6 | 35 |
| 12 | Newport Wasps | 32 | 13 | 2 | 17 | 1394 | 1472 | 28 | 6 | 34 |
| 13 | Rye House Rockets | 32 | 13 | 2 | 17 | 1373 | 1496 | 28 | 5 | 33 |
| 14 | Trelawny Tigers | 32 | 13 | 1 | 18 | 1343 | 1539 | 27 | 4 | 31 |
| 15 | Workington Comets | 32 | 12 | 3 | 17 | 1368 | 1518 | 27 | 3 | 30 |
| 16 | Somerset Rebels | 32 | 9 | 2 | 21 | 1344 | 1536 | 20 | 4 | 24 |
| 17 | Glasgow Tigers | 32 | 9 | 0 | 23 | 1335 | 1533 | 18 | 2 | 20 |

=== Fixtures and results ===
| Home \ Away | AE | BER | ED | EX | GLA | HV | IOW | ND | NW | RR | RYE | SHE | SOM | STO | SWI | TT | WOR |
|---|---|---|---|---|---|---|---|---|---|---|---|---|---|---|---|---|---|
| Arena Essex Hammers | | 52–38 | 54–36 | 46–44 | 48–36 | 46–44 | 47–45 | 43–47 | 56–34 | 54–36 | 46–44 | 44–4 | 53–37 | 44–46 | 45–45 | 51–38 | 53–37 |
| Berwick Bandits | 45–45 | | 50–40 | 54–36 | 63–27 | 56–34 | 48–42 | 54–36 | 55–35 | 51–39 | 55–35 | 43–47 | 54–36 | 50–40 | 57–33 | 67–23 | 54–36 |
| Edinburgh Monarchs | 51–39 | 61–29 | | 53–37 | 45–42 | 44–46 | 52–38 | 42–47 | 52–38 | 46–44 | 45–45 | 51–39 | 51–39 | 55–35 | 48–42 | 52–38 | 48–42 |
| Exeter Falcons | 57–33 | 46–44 | 57–33 | | 62–28 | 42–47 | 48–42 | 64–25 | 56–34 | 47–42 | 62–28 | 46–44 | 58–31 | 43–47 | 54–36 | 59–33 | 60–30 |
| Glasgow Tigers | 52–38 | 52–39 | 46–44 | 50–40 | | 44–46 | 43–47 | 49–42 | 44–46 | 46–44 | 52–38 | 38–51 | 49–41 | 39–49 | 45–44 | 43–47 | 43–47 |
| Hull Vikings | 47–43 | 42–48 | 44–46 | 51–39 | 46–44 | | 47–41 | 40–50 | 50–39 | 49–41 | 49–41 | 46–44 | 49–41 | 54–36 | 50–40 | 60–30 | 58–32 |
| Isle of Wight Islanders | 60–29 | 57–34 | 59–31 | 55–35 | 55–35 | 44–43 | | 47–43 | 58–32 | 57–33 | 55–34 | 46–44 | 49–40 | 49–41 | 53–37 | 50–40 | 56–34 |
| Newcastle Diamonds | 46–44 | 44–44 | 53–37 | 54–36 | 55–35 | 62–28 | 46–41 | | 48–41 | 53–37 | 45–33 | 51–39 | 61–29 | 60–30 | 55–35 | 46–44 | 50–40 |
| Newport Wasps | 54–36 | 43–46 | 45–45 | 52–38 | 48–42 | 45–35 | 39–51 | 43–47 | | 49–41 | 54–36 | 45–45 | 53–37 | 49–41 | 49–41 | 56–34 | 48–41 |
| Reading Racers | 54–36 | 48–42 | 45–44 | 53–37 | 54–36 | 47–43 | 43–46 | 51–39 | 45–44 | | 52–38 | 47–43 | 57–33 | 47–43 | 47–43 | 51–37 | 50–40 |
| Rye House Rockets | 51–39 | 41–49 | 51–39 | 56–34 | 49–41 | 44–46 | 48–42 | 49–41 | 46–44 | 47–43 | | 47–43 | 52–38 | 44–46 | 41–51 | 53–37 | 49–41 |
| Sheffield Tigers | 48–42 | 54–36 | 57–33 | 66–24 | 59–31 | 52–39 | 54–36 | 58–32 | 57–33 | 67–23 | 58–32 | | 65–25 | 55–35 | 48–43 | 66–24 | 58–32 |
| Somerset Rebels | 49–41 | 45–45 | 45–45 | 47–43 | 51–39 | 42–48 | 39–51 | 48–42 | 55–35 | 44–46 | 46–44 | 44–46 | | 51–39 | 43–49 | 48–42 | 50–40 |
| Stoke Potters | 52–38 | 47–43 | 56–34 | 54–36 | 45–44 | 58–32 | 45–45 | 48–42 | 53–38 | 53–36 | 56–34 | 50–40 | 48–42 | | 43–47 | 44–46 | 50–39 |
| Swindon Robins | 49–41 | 47–43 | 54–36 | 51–39 | 52–38 | 47–43 | 53–36 | 44–46 | 43–47 | 50–40 | 55–35 | 54–36 | 47–43 | 49–41 | | 59–31 | 49–40 |
| Trelawny Tigers | 44–46 | 49–41 | 49–41 | 47–43 | 49–41 | 44–45 | 47–43 | 42–49 | 51–39 | 44–46 | 49–41 | 49–41 | 48–42 | 47–43 | 45–45 | | 51–42 |
| Workington Comets | 45–45 | 48–43 | 45–45 | 49–41 | 49–41 | 47–43 | 44–46 | 49–44 | 47–43 | 45–47 | 45–45 | 47–43 | 47–43 | 51–39 | 50–40 | 47–43 | |

Legend: Blue = home team win; Yellow = draw; Red = away team win.

== Premier League Knockout Cup ==
The 2002 Premier League Knockout Cup was the 35th edition of the Knockout Cup for tier two teams. Sheffield Tigers were the winners of the competition.

First round

| Date | Team one | Score | Team two |
|---|---|---|---|
| 20/04 | Rye House | 53-37 | Somerset |
| 10/05 | Somerset | 45-45 | Rye House |

Second round

| Date | Team one | Score | Team two |
|---|---|---|---|
| 27/05 | Reading | 47-43 | Arena Essex |
| 31/05 | Arena Essex | 48-42 | Reading |
| 30/05 | Sheffield | 55-36 | Isle of Wight |
| 28/05 | Isle of Wight | 46-44 | Sheffield |
| 02/06 | Glasgow | 48-42 | Workington |
| 01/06 | Workington | 41-49 | Glasgow |
| 27/05 | Newcastle | 53-37 | Trelawny |
| 28/05 | Trelawny | 46-43 | Newcastle |
| 01/06 | Stoke | 49-41 | Exeter |
| 27/05 | Exeter | 46-44 | Stoke |
| 24/04 | Hull | 54-36 | Berwick |
| 20/04 | Berwick | 52-38 | Hull |
| 01/06 | Rye House | 46-44 | Swindon |
| 30/05 | Swindon | 45-45 | Rye House |
| 02/06 | Newport | 49-41 | Edinburgh |
| 31/05 | Edinburgh | 49-41 | Newport |
| 20/07 replay | Newport | 54-36 | Edinburgh |
| 05/07 replay | Edinburgh | 49-41 | Newport |

Quarter-finals

| Date | Team one | Score | Team two |
|---|---|---|---|
| 29/08 | Sheffield | 61-39 | Glasgow |
| 12/08 | Glasgow | 44-46 | Sheffield |
| 29/07 | Newcastle | 57-33 | Stoke |
| 31/08 | Stoke | 49-41 | Newcastle |
| 31/07 | Hull | 45-45 | Rye House |
| 28/07 | Rye House | 44-46 | Hull |
| 28/07 | Newport | 48-41 | Arena Essex |
| 02/08 | Arena Essex | 45-45 | Newport |

Semi-finals

| Date | Team one | Score | Team two |
|---|---|---|---|
| 03/10 | Sheffield | 63-27 | Newcastle |
| 30/09 | Newcastle | 53-37 | Sheffield |
| 18/09 | Hull | 51-39 | Newport |
| 29/09 | Newport | 50-40 | Hull |

=== Final ===
First leg

16 October 2002

| Hull Vikings Lee Smethills 12 Robbie Kessler 10 Garry Stead 9 Paul Thorp 7 Jamie Smith 6 Emil Kramer 3 Craig Branney 2 | 49 – 41 | Sheffield Tigers Lee Complin 11 Simon Stead 9 Sean Wilson 7 Scott Smith 6 Ricky Ashworth 4 Andrew Moore 3 Jamie Birkinshaw 1 |

Craven Park, Hull

Second leg

24 October 2002

| Sheffield Tigers Sean Wilson 13 Simon Stead 12 Lee Complin 7 Ricky Ashworth 7 Scott Smith 6 Andrew Moore 6 Jamie Birkinshaw 5 | 56 – 34 | Hull Vikings Robbie Kessler 12 Lee Smethills 10 Garry Stead 6 Paul Thorp 5 Craig Branney 1 Jamie Smith 0 Emil Kramer 0 |

Owlerton Stadium

Sheffield were declared Knockout Cup Champions, winning on aggregate 97–83.

== Premier Trophy ==
North Group

| Pos | Team | P | W | D | L | Pts |
|---|---|---|---|---|---|---|
| 1 | Hull | 6 | 4 | 1 | 1 | 9 |
| 2 | Sheffield | 6 | 4 | 0 | 2 | 8 |
| 3 | Newcastle | 6 | 2 | 0 | 4 | 4 |
| 4 | Stoke | 6 | 1 | 1 | 4 | 3 |

South Group

| Pos | Team | P | W | D | L | Pts |
|---|---|---|---|---|---|---|
| 1 | Reading | 6 | 4 | 0 | 2 | 8 |
| 2 | Arena Essex | 6 | 3 | 0 | 3 | 6 |
| 3 | Rye House | 6 | 3 | 0 | 3 | 6 |
| 4 | Isle of Wight | 6 | 2 | 0 | 4 | 4 |

| Home \ Away | HUL | NEW | SHE | STO |
|---|---|---|---|---|
| Hull | | 57–33 | 51–39 | 52–37 |
| Newcastle | 43–47 | | 49–41 | 55–35 |
| Sheffield | 55–36 | 60–29 | | 51–39 |
| Stoke | 45–45 | 46–44 | 42–48 | |

Legend: Blue = home team win; Yellow = draw; Red = away team win.

| Home \ Away | AE | IOW | REA | RYE |
|---|---|---|---|---|
| Arena Essex | | 48–41 | 52–38 | 48–42 |
| Isle of Wight | 47–43 | | 43–47 | 50–40 |
| Reading | 54–36 | 46–44 | | 65–25 |
| Rye House | 47–43 | 47–42 | 53–36 | |

Legend: Blue = home team win; Yellow = draw; Red = away team win.

Border Group

| Pos | Team | P | W | D | L | Pts |
|---|---|---|---|---|---|---|
| 1 | Berwick | 6 | 4 | 0 | 2 | 8 |
| 2 | Glasgow | 6 | 3 | 1 | 2 | 7 |
| 3 | Edinburgh | 6 | 2 | 1 | 3 | 5 |
| 4 | Workington | 6 | 2 | 0 | 4 | 4 |

West Group

| Pos | Team | P | W | D | L | Pts |
|---|---|---|---|---|---|---|
| 1 | Trelawny | 8 | 5 | 1 | 2 | 11 |
| 2 | Newport | 8 | 5 | 0 | 3 | 10 |
| 3 | Swindon | 8 | 5 | 0 | 3 | 10 |
| 4 | Somerset | 8 | 3 | 1 | 4 | 7 |
| 5 | Exeter | 8 | 1 | 0 | 7 | 2 |

| Home \ Away | BER | ED | GLA | WOR |
|---|---|---|---|---|
| Berwick | | 60–30 | 48–42 | 54–36 |
| Edinburgh | 48–42 | | 44–46 | 46–43 |
| Glasgow | 57–33 | 45–45 | | 46–44 |
| Workington | 44–47 | 51–39 | 46–44 | |

Legend: Blue = home team win; Yellow = draw; Red = away team win.

| Home \ Away | EX | NWP | SOM | SWI | TRE |
|---|---|---|---|---|---|
| Exeter | | 42–48 | 50–40 | 42–48 | 38–51 |
| Newport | 47–42 | | 47–43 | 57–33 | 46–44 |
| Somerset | 49–41 | 48–42 | | 47–43 | 45–45 |
| Swindon | 50–40 | 48–42 | 47–43 | | 55–35 |
| Trelawny | 51–39 | 50–40 | 58–32 | 49–41 | |

Legend: Blue = home team win; Yellow = draw; Red = away team win.

Semi-final

| Team one | Team two | Score |
|---|---|---|
| Reading | Trelawny | 44–46, 38–52 |
| Berwick | Sheffield | 53–37, 33–57 |

Final

| Team one | Team two | Score |
|---|---|---|
| Trelawny | Sheffield | 63–27, 28–61 |

== Young Shield ==
- End of season competition for top 8 league teams

First Round

| Team one | Team two | Score |
|---|---|---|
| Swindon | Berwick | 41–49, 38–52 |
| Reading | Isle of Wight | 47–43, 33–39 |
| Sheffield | Hull | 59–31, 36–54 |
| Stoke | Newcastle | 58–32, 36–54 |

Semi-final

| Team one | Team two | Score |
|---|---|---|
| Sheffield | Stoke | 58–32, 46–44 |
| Berwick | Isle of Wight | 43–47, 37–53 |

Final

| Team one | Team two | Score |
|---|---|---|
| Isle of Wight | Sheffield | 46–44, 35–54 |

== Riders' Championship ==
Adam Shields won the Riders' Championship. The final was held on 8 September at Belle Vue Stadium.

| Pos. | Rider | Pts | Total | SF | Final |
|---|---|---|---|---|---|
| 1 | (Australia) Adam Shields | 3 3 ex 2 3 | 11 | - | 3 |
| 2 | (Australia) Craig Watson | 3 2 3 3 1 | 12 | - | 2 |
| 3 | (Wales) Phil Morris | 3 2 2 2 2 | 11 | 2 | 1 |
| 4 | (United States) Brent Werner | 0 1 3 3 2 | 9 | 3 | 0 |
| 5 | (England) Andre Compton | 2 3 3 0 3 | 11 | 1 | |
| 6 | (Sweden) Peter Ingvar Karlsson | 2 ex 2 1 3 | 8 | 0 | |
| 7 | (England) Garry Stead | 1 2 2 1 2 | 8 | | |
| 8 | (Czech Republic) Marián Jirout | 2 3 0 1 1 | 7 | | |
| 9 | (Denmark) Jan Staechmann | 3 1 1 1 1 | 7 | | |
| 10 | (Czech Republic) George Štancl | 2 1 ex 2 2 | 7 | | |
| 11 | (England) Paul Bentley | 0 0 0 3 3 | 6 | | |
| 12 | (Denmark) Charlie Gjedde | 0 2 3 ex 0 | 5 | | |
| 13 | (England) Michael Coles | 0 0 1 3 1 | 5 | | |
| 14 | (Denmark) Frede Schött | 1 3 1 0 0 | 5 | | |
| 15 | (England) Leigh Lanham | 1 0 2 2 ex | 5 | | |
| 16 | (England) Simon Stead | 1 1 1 0 0 | 3 | | |
| 17 | (England) Steve Masters (res) | 0 | 0 | | |

- f=fell, r-retired, ex=excluded, ef=engine failure t=touched tapes

== Pairs ==
The Premier League Pairs Championship was held at Derwent Park on 19 July. The event was won by the Isle of Wight Islanders.

Group A
| Pos | Team | Pts | Riders |
|---|---|---|---|
| 1 | Newport | 23 | Smart 13, Watson 10 |
| 2 | Edinburgh | 19 | Carr P 11, Schott 8 |
| 3 | Workington | 17 | Stonehewer 13, Karlsson 4 |
| 4 | Reading | 16 | Mullett 9, Morris 7 |
| 5 | Sheffield | 15 | Wilson 10, Stead 5 |

Group B
| Pos | Team | Pts | Riders |
|---|---|---|---|
| 1 | Isle of Wight | 24 | Shields 13, Bird 11 |
| 2 | Hull | 20 | Stead 12, Kessler 8 |
| 3 | Berwick | 17 | Bentley 14, Kristensen 3 |
| 4 | Somerset | 15 | Jirout 8, Cunningham 7 |
| 5 | Glasgow | 14 | Stancl 9, Grieves 5 |

Semi-finals

- Isle of Wight bt Edinburgh
- Newport bt Hull

Final

- Isle of Wight bt Newport

== Fours ==
Berwick Bandits won the Premier League Four-Team Championship, which was held on 21 July 2002, at the Brandon Stadium.

Group A
| Pos | Team | Pts | Riders |
|---|---|---|---|
| 1 | Hull | 15 | Stead G 5, Kessler 5, Thorp 3, Smith J 2 |
| 2 | Newport | 14 | Smart 4, Smith S 4, Watson 3, Dicken 3 |
| 3 | Glasgow | 10 | Stancl 4, Grieves 3, Powell 2, Olsson 1 |
| 4 | Sheffield | 9 | Wilson 5, Complin 2, Stead S 1, Smith S 1 |

Group B
| Pos | Team | Pts | Riders |
|---|---|---|---|
| 1 | Berwick | 15 | Kristensen 4, Rymel 4, Bentley 4, Makovsky 3 |
| 2 | Arena Essex | 12 | White 4, Tacey 3, Lanham 3, Tatum 2 |
| 3 | Reading | 11 | Henriksson 6, Morris 2, Mullett 2, Schramm 1 |
| 4 | Isle of Wight | 10 | Bager 4, Bird 3, Shields 2, Read 1, Simmons 0 |

Final
| Pos | Team | Pts | Riders |
|---|---|---|---|
| 1 | Berwick | 22 | Bentley 8, Rymel 6, Makovsky 5. Kristensen 3 |
| 2 | Arena Essex | 21 | White 8, Tatum 6, Tacey 4, Lanham 3 |
| 3 | Newport | 16 | Smart 5, Smith S 4, Dicken 4, Watson 3 |
| 4 | Hull | 13 | Kessler 6, Thorp 3, Smith J 2, Smethills 2, Stead G 0 |

== Final leading averages ==
| Rider | Team | Average |
|---|---|---|
| (England) Sean Wilson | Sheffield | 10.17 |
| (England) Carl Stonehewer | Workington | 10.08 |
| (Australia) Adam Shields | Isle of Wight | 9.85 |
| (England) Ray Morton | Isle of Wight | 9.53 |
| (England) Paul Fry | Swindon | 9.46 |
| (Czech Republic) Marián Jirout | Somerset | 9.31 |
| (England) Paul Bentley | Berwick | 9.24 |
| (England) Leigh Lanham | Arena Essex | 9.19 |
| (England) Peter Carr | Edinburgh | 9.17 |
| (England) Chris Harris | Trewlany | 9.13 |

== Riders & final averages ==
Arena Essex

- Leigh Lanham 9.19
- Kelvin Tatum 8.48
- Shaun Tacey 7.30
- Colin White 7.24
- Lee Herne 4.78
- Andy Galvin 3.79
- Carl Baldwin 3.37
- Scott Courtney 2.67

Berwick

- Paul Bentley 9.24
- Claus Kristensen 7.79
- Michal Makovský 7.50
- Adrian Rymel 6.99
- Simon Cartwright 6.65
- Kevin Doolan 6.29
- Steffen Mell 5.06

Edinburgh

- Peter Carr 9.17
- Frede Schott 8.20
- Daniel Andersson 7.36
- Magnus Karlsson 7.00
- Theo Pijper 5.85
- Aidan Collins 5.72
- Rory Schlein 5.52
- Christian Henry 4.92
- David Meldrum 4.27
- Ben Shields 3.41

Exeter

- Seemond Stephens 8.46
- Michael Coles 8.34
- Mark Simmonds 7.78
- Roger Lobb 7.52
- Lawrence Hare 6.92
- Krister Marsh 6.58
- Bobby Eldridge 5.52
- Jason Prynne 3.81
- Matt Cambridge 3.34
- Corey Blackman 2.53

Glasgow

- George Štancl 9.04
- James Grieves 8.08
- Mick Powell 7.75
- Kenny Olsson 5.13
- Martin Dixon 4.70
- David McAllan 4.40
- Grant MacDonald 3.17

Hull

- Garry Stead 8.68
- Robbie Kessler 8.33
- Paul Thorp 8.08
- Ross Brady 7.75
- Jamie Smith 6.17
- Emil Kramer 5.97
- Lee Smethills 5.55
- Craig Branney 1.91

Isle of Wight

- Adam Shields 9.85
- Ray Morton 9.53
- Danny Bird 8.28
- Henning Bager 6.25
- Sebastien Trésarrieu 6.20
- Matt Read 5.76
- Gary Phelps 5.21
- Nick Simmons 3.92
- Daniel Giffard 2.10

Newcastle

- Kenneth Bjerre 8.61
- Andre Compton 8.33
- Davey Watt 8.00
- Kevin Little 6.98
- Richard Juul 5.89
- Derek Sneddon 5.69
- Wayne Carter 4.95
- Rob Grant Jr 3.74
- Richard Hall 1.37

Newport

- Craig Watson 8.94
- Frank Smart 8.91
- Scott Smith 6.85
- Emil Lindqvist 6.75
- Lee Dicken 6.04
- Carl Wilkinson 4.31
- Ashley Jones 3.13
- Barrie Evans 2.74

Reading

- Andrew Appleton 8.95
- Phil Morris 8.68
- Dave Mullett 8.56
- Anders Henriksson 7.54
- Jason Bunyan 6.82
- Paul Clews 5.96
- Chris Schramm 4.32
- Glen Phillips 4.29
- Gavin Hedge 2.97

Rye House

- Brent Werner 8.47
- Nigel Sadler 8.11
- Scott Robson 7.51
- Mark Courtney 6.60
- David Mason 5.39
- Scott Swain 5.19
- Troy Pratt 4.41
- Adam Pryer 3.09
- Chris Courage 2.80
- Daniel Giffard 1.40

Sheffield

- Sean Wilson 10.17
- Simon Stead 8.53
- Lee Complin 7.67
- Scott Smith 7.20
- Andrew Moore 6.97
- James Birkinshaw 6.12
- Ricky Ashworth 4.94

Somerset

- Marián Jirout 9.31
- Glenn Cunningham 7.74
- Neil Collins 6.89
- Graeme Gordon 5.58
- Steve Bishop 5.17
- Adam Allott 4.37
- David Meldrum 4.35
- Malcolm Holloway 3.77
- Gary Phelps 3.23
- Stuart Williams 2.63
- Shane McCabe 2.61

Stoke

- Alan Mogridge 8.50
- Jan Staechmann 8.48
- Paul Pickering 7.90
- Tony Atkin 6.14
- Jon Armstrong 5.79
- Mark Burrows 5.13
- Will Beveridge 4.06
- Rob Grant Jr. 4.00
- Lee Hodgson 2.46

Swindon

- Paul Fry 9.46
- Charlie Gjedde 8.92
- Oliver Allen 8.30
- Chris Neath 6.47
- Paul Lee 5.04
- Adam Allott 5.02
- Jason King 3.65
- Ritchie Hawkins 3.34

Trelawny

- Chris Harris 9.13
- Alun Rossiter 7.27
- Emiliano Sanchez 7.13
- Steve Masters 6.98
- Richard Wolff 6.95
- Seemond Stephens 6.19
- Pavel Ondrašík 5.88
- Simon Phillips 4.39
- Jason Prynne 2.51

Workington

- Carl Stonehewer 10.08
- Peter Ingvar Karlsson 8.10
- Les Collins 8.08
- Rusty Harrison 7.65
- Kauko Nieminen 6.20
- Chris Collins 2.89
- James Mann 2.87
- Scott James 2.67
- Lee Hodgson 2.24
- Tom Brown 2.10
- Shane Colvin 1.82

== See also ==
- List of United Kingdom Speedway League Champions
- Knockout Cup (speedway)
