= 2005 Premier League speedway season =

British motorcycle speedway season

- League: Premier League
- Champions: Rye House Rockets
- Knockout Cup: King's Lynn Stars
- Premier Trophy: Rye House Rockets
- Young Shield: King's Lynn Stars
- Individual: Sean Wilson
- Pairs: Glasgow Tigers
- Fours: Somerset Rebels
- Highest average: Matej Žagar
- Division/s above: 2005 Elite League
- Division/s below: 2005 Conference League

The 2005 Premier League speedway season was the second division of speedway in the United Kingdom and governed by the Speedway Control Board (SCB), in conjunction with the British Speedway Promoters' Association (BSPA).

== Season summary ==
The League consisted of 15 teams for the 2005 season.

Two Hull Vikings home fixtures (versus Glasgow Tigers and King's Lynn Stars) were not ridden due to Hull being evicted from their track at Craven Park, Hull.

The League was run on a standard format with no play-offs and was won by the Rye House Rockets.

== League ==
=== Final table ===
Pos		M	W	D	L	F	A	Pts	Bon	Tot
1	Rye House Rockets	28	20	1	7	1448	1133	41	12	53
2	Berwick Bandits	28	19	0	9	1371	1208	38	11	49
3	Sheffield Tigers	28	16	0	12	1361	1249	32	11	43
4	King's Lynn Stars	27	27	0	10	1305	1185	34	7	41
5	Edinburgh Monarchs	28	15	1	12	1323	1263	31	10	41
6	Isle of Wight Islanders	28	15	1	12	1363	1237	31	8	39
7	Workington Comets	28	14	2	12	1282	1287	30	7	37
8	Newcastle Diamonds	28	14	2	12	1251	1338	30	5	35
9	Exeter Falcons	28	13	0	15	1262.5	1342.5	26	6	32
10	Reading Racers	28	12	0	16	1281	1310	24	4	28
11	Somerset Rebels	28	11	0	17	1250	1317	22	6	28
12	Glasgow Tigers	27	11	0	16	1243	1241	22	5	27
13	Hull Vikings	26	11	0	15	1129.5	1257.5	22	5	27
14	Stoke Potters	28	11	0	17	1230	1347	22	4	26
15	Newport Wasps	28	5	1	22	1097	1482	11	2	13

=== Fixtures and results ===
Home \ Away	BER	ED	EX	GLA	HV	IOW	KL	ND	NW	RR	RYE	SHE	SOM	STO	WOR
Berwick Bandits		54–41	57–37	54–40	61–32	50–40	49–41	55–40	61–32	60–32	57–35	55–37	58–36	51–39	56–38
Edinburgh Monarchs	59–34		60–35	51–43	60–35	63–30	57–38	53–40	60–35	46–43	40–52	45–43	55–39	53–42	36–36
Exeter Falcons	38–52	53–42		57–37	49–41	50–45	55–40	60–35	65–28	54–39	37–53	56–39	54–40	46–44	61–32
Glasgow Tigers	46–48	51–39	55–38		64–29	46–44	35–36	59–34	48–42	52–42	43–47	51–41	54–41	53–40	42–51
Hull Vikings	44–46	38–53	49.5–46.5	n/a		55–37	n/a	51–43	52–38	47–43	57–33	50–45	40–2	56–36	55–40
Isle of Wight Islanders	50–46	61–34	60–33	54–39	59–36		56–40	71–23	65–31	50–42	54–40	59–33	56–37	50–46	45–45
King's Lynn Stars	45–44	55–41	56–35	45–44	64–29	57–37		52–38	67–26	53–39	53–38	52–39	62–32	61–34	53–43
Newcastle Diamonds	47–43	49–47	54–40	47–43	48–42	56–36	58–38		55–36	50–42	45–45	49–41	60–36	48–41	58–36
Newport Wasps	49–41	47–46	44–46	51–44	42–48	40–50	35–58	45–45		42–53	34–58	38–53	41–49	46–48	48–42
Reading Racers	44–49	46–47	61–32	47–46	58–36	50–45	51–41	45–47	49–41		44–46	56–37	46–44	58–39	49–44
Rye House Rockets	65–25	58–37	66–26	55–40	50–44	59–37	61–34	54–41	64–28	57–36		61–32	60–31	63–27	57–36
Sheffield Tigers	48–41	57–36	56–37	51–44	56–39	50–45	56–40	63–29	53–41	60–35	64–30		65–30	56–40	59–36
Somerset Rebels	48–42	60–32	53–42	56–39	56–38	43–51	43–47	58–34	64–30	47–43	48–42	44–46		56–40	39–45
Stoke Potters	46–49	47–42	50–40	44–46	51–43	43–34	55–39	48–42	55–38	42–50	36–56	55–41	48–42		50–43
Workington Comets	59–33	42–48	54–40	57–39	47–43	50–42	55–38	58–36	43–49	56–38	47–43	55–40	47–46	45–44	

Legend: Blue = home team win; Yellow = draw; Red = away team win.

== Premier League Knockout Cup ==
The 2005 Premier League Knockout Cup was the 38th edition of the Knockout Cup for tier two teams. King's Lynn Stars were the winners of the competition.

First round

Date	Team one	Score	Team two
26/05	Sheffield	51-39	Isle of Wight
07/06	Isle of Wight	55-34	Sheffield
29/05	Glasgow	56-34	Hull
13/07	Hull	44-46	Glasgow
03/06	Edinburgh	47-43	Rye House
04/06	Rye House	57-33	Edinburgh
03/06	Somerset	44-46	Workington
04/06	Workington	47-43	Somerset
05/06	Newcastle	53-36	Kings Lynn
29/06	Kings Lynn	58-32	Newcastle
06/06	Reading	54-36	Newport
17/07	Newport	39-51	Reading
12/06	Stoke	42-48	Berwick
29/06	Berwick	56-34	Stoke

Quarter-finals

Date	Team one	Score	Team two
16/07	Berwick	49-41	Workington
17/07	Workington	42-48	Berwick
16/07	Rye House	48-42	Glasgow
24/07	Glasgow	33-57	Rye House
18/07	Exeter	45-45	Kings Lynn
20/07	Kings Lynn	63-27	Exeter
28/07	Isle Of Wight	46-44	Reading
08/08	Reading	51-33	Isle Of Wight

Semi-finals

Date	Team one	Score	Team two
03/09	Berwick	45-44	Kings Lynn
07/09	Kings Lynn	56-34	Berwick
05/09	Reading	43-47	Rye House
24/09	Rye House	65-25	Reading

Final

First leg

21 October 2005

King's Lynn Stars Tomáš Topinka 15 Oliver Allen 12 Troy Batchelor 10 Kevin Doolan 10 Ashley Jones 8 Jan Jaros 5 Simon Lambert 3	63 – 27	Rye House Rockets Brent Werner 9 Thomas Allen 7 Edward Kennett 4 Chris Neath 4 Daniel King 2 Steve Boxall 1 Stuart Robson R/R

King's Lynn Stadium

Second leg

22 October 2005

Rye House Rockets Brent Werner 14 Chris Neath 11 Thomas Allen 9 Daniel King 9 Edward Kennett 8 Steve Boxall 5 Stuart Robson R/R	56 – 34	King's Lynn Stars Oliver Allen 11 Troy Batchelor 7 Tomáš Topinka 6 Jan Jaros 4 Kevin Doolan 3 Ashley Jones 3 Benji Compton 0

Rye House Stadium

King's Lynn were declared Knockout Cup Champions, winning on aggregate 97–83.

== Premier Trophy ==
North Group

Pos	Team	P	W	D	L	Pts
1	Workington	14	9	0	5	23
2	Sheffield	14	7	0	7	20
3	Edinburgh	14	7	1	6	20
4	Hull	14	8	0	6	19
5	Stoke	14	6	1	7	16
6	Berwick	14	7	0	7	15
7	Newcastle	14	6	0	8	14
8	Glasgow	14	3	4	7	13

South Group

Pos	Team	P	W	D	L	Pts
1	Rye House	12	10	0	2	26
2	Exeter	12	6	0	6	16
3	King's Lynn	12	7	0	5	16
4	Isle of Wight	12	6	0	6	14
5	Newport	12	5	0	7	13
6	Somerset	12	4	0	8	10
7	Reading	12	4	0	8	10

Home \ Away	BER	ED	GLA	HUL	NEW	SHE	STO	WOR
Berwick		53–43	45–45	57–47	55–39	55–40	52–41	53–39
Edinburgh	62–29		53–40	42–49	53–43	60–34	53–43	49–41
Glasgow	45–45	46–46		52–40	54–40	52–43	44–46	44–46
Hull	54–42	53–42	52–41		59–36	47–45	53–42	51–39
Newcastle	58–35	48–41	48–42	51–42		48–41	51–39	42–48
Sheffield	59–35	50–40	61–36	64–28	58–38		60–35	53–39
Stoke	53–40	44–46	45–45	52–44	45–44	55–37		52–42
Workington	54–40	60–34	47–43	56–36	64–30	55–42	50–42	

Legend: Blue = home team win; Yellow = draw; Red = away team win.

Home \ Away	EX	IOW	KL	NWP	REA	RYE	SOM
Exeter		53–39	64–29	43–47	55–40	54–41	51–43
Isle of Wight	48–42		54–39	52–42	51–39	44–46	50–40
King's Lynn	56–37	57–36		53–39	49–44	52–41	51–44
Newport	41–49	50–40	46–47		49–44	38–52	55–36
Reading	46–44	46–47	52–39	48–44		40–48	48–42
Rye House	59–33	61–32	59–34	50–40	55–40		50–43
Somerset	52–41	46–44	54–43	44–49	48–45	44–48	

Legend: Blue = home team win; Yellow = draw; Red = away team win.

Semi-final

Team one	Team two	Score
Workington	Exeter	60–31, 40–56
Rye House	Sheffield	66–26, 39–50

Final

Team one	Team two	Score
Workington	Rye House	44–46, 32–61

== Young Shield ==
End of season competition for the highest eight league teams

First Round

Team one	Team two	Score
Workington	King's Lynn	50–42, 42–52
Sheffield	Edinburgh	57–37, 38–54
Rye House	Isle of Wight	62–30, 441–54
Berwick	Newcastle	60–35, 42–48

Semi-final

Team one	Team two	Score
Berwick	King's Lynn	49–48, 35–57
Sheffield	Rye House	59–36, 30–62

Final

Team one	Team two	Score
King's Lynn	Rye House	59–34, 42–51

== Riders' Championship ==
Sean Wilson won the Riders' Championship for the third time. The final was held on 18 September at Owlerton Stadium.

Pos.	Rider	Pts	Total	SF	Final
1	(England) Sean Wilson	3 2 3 3 1	12	-	3
2	(England) Alan Mogridge	2 3 3 3 2	13	-	2
3	(Czech Republic) Tomáš Topinka	ef 3 2 3 3	11	2	1
4	(Australia) Mark Lemon	1 2 3 2 2	10	3	0
5	(Australia) Shane Parker	1 1 2 2 3	9	1	
6	(England) Stuart Robson	3 2 1 2 1	9	0	
7	(England) Andre Compton	f 3 3 ex 2	8		
8	(Sweden) Magnus Zetterström	3 ef 0 3 2	8		
9	(England) James Wright	1 2 0 1 3	7		
10	(Australia) Rusty Harrison	3 1 2 1 0	7		
11	(Australia) Craig Boyce	2 1 2 2 0	7		
12	(Slovenia) Matej Žagar	2 ef 0 1 3	6		
13	(England) Garry Stead	2 3 - - -	5		
14	(Czech Republic) Adrian Rymel	1 ef 1 1 1	4		
15	(Denmark) Mads Korneliussen	0 1 0 0 1	2		
16	(Scotland) James Grieves	0 0 1 0 0	1		
17	(England) Benji Compton (res)	1 0	1		
18	(England) Luke Priest (res)	0	0		

- f=fell, r-retired, ex=excluded, ef=engine failure t=touched tapes

== Pairs ==
The Premier League Pairs Championship was held at Ashfield Stadium on 26 June. The event was won by Glasgow.

Group A
Pos	Team	Pts	Riders
1	Rye House	20	Robson 16, Neath 4
2	Exeter	20	Stephens 11, Lemon 9
3	Edinburgh	18	Harrison 12, Brady 6
4	Newcastle	16	Grieves 12, Franc 4
5	Sheffield	16	Compton 11, Ashworth 5

Group B
Pos	Team	Pts	Riders
1	Somerset	22	Zetterstrom 15, Cunningham 7
2	Glasgow	21	Parker 13, Stancl 8
3	Hull	18	Thorp 14, Kramer 4
4	King's Lynn	15	Topinka 12, Allen 3
5	Workington	14	Stonehewer 10, Wright 4

Semi finals

- Glasgow bt Rye House 6–3
- Somerset bt Exeter 7–2

Final

- Glasgow bt Somerset 5–4

== Fours ==
Somerset Rebels won the Premier League Four-Team Championship, which was held on 20 August 2005, at Derwent Park.

Group A
Pos	Team	Pts	Riders
1	Somerset	15	
2	Rye House	14	
3	Berwick	11	
4	Glasgow	8	

Group B
Pos	Team	Pts	Riders
1	Workington	18	
2	Exeter	11	
3	Sheffield	10	
4	Edinburgh	9	

Final
Pos	Team	Pts	Riders
1	Somerset	21	Zetterstrom, Cunningham, Fry, Hawkins
2	Workington	20	
3	Exeter	16	
4	Rye House	14	

== Final leading averages ==
Rider	Team	Average
(Slovenia) Matej Žagar	Reading	10.43
(Czech Republic) Tomáš Topinka	Kings Lynn	9.93
(England) Carl Stonehewer	Workington	9.89
(Australia) Craig Boyce	Isle of Wight	9.81
(Australia) Shane Parker	Glasgow	9.74
(Sweden) Magnus Zetterström	Somerset	9.38
(England) Sean Wilson	Sheffield	9.21
(England) Andre Compton	Sheffield	9.08
(England) Stuart Robson	Rye House	9.03
(England) Oliver Allen	Kings Lynn	9.03

== Riders & final averages ==
Berwick

- Adrian Rymel 8.36
- Michal Makovský 7.83
- Adam Pietraszko 7.35
- Scott Smith 7.07
- Tom P. Madsen 7.02
- Carl Wilkinson 7.01
- Piotr Dym 6.64
- Chris Schramm 5.98
- Joachim Kugelmann 5.42
- Simon Cartwright 4.83

Edinburgh

- Russell Harrison 8.33
- Theo Pijper 8.11
- Ross Brady 8.09
- Daniel Nermark 8.06
- Matthew Wethers 7.29
- David McAllan 6.32
- Cameron Woodward 6.28
- William Lawson 5.45
- Kristian Lund 4.12
- Robert Ksiezak 3.27

Exeter

- Mark Lemon 8.73
- Ray Morton 8.17
- Seemond Stephens 7.20
- Sebastien Trésarrieu 7.09
- Antonín Šváb Jr. 7.08
- Lee Smethills 6.18
- Pavel Ondrašík 5.77
- Ben Barker 3.89
- Nick Simmons 3.24

Glasgow

- Shane Parker 9.74
- George Štancl 8.66
- Stefan Ekberg 8.29
- Claus Kristensen 5.91
- Trent Leverington 5.83
- Paul Bentley 5.67
- James Birkinshaw 4.95
- James Cockle 4.76
- Matthew Wethers 4.63
- Adam Roynon 2.94

Hull

- Garry Stead 8.05
- Paul Thorp 8.00
- Emiliano Sanchez 7.89
- Emil Kramer 7.35
- Craig Branney 5.05
- Lee Dicken 4.88
- Daniel Giffard 4.83
- Simone Terenzani 4.64
- Joel Parsons 4.45

Isle of Wight

- Craig Boyce 9.81
- Ulrich Østergaard 8.19
- Krzysztof Stojanowski 7.45
- Krister Marsh 6.44
- Steen Jensen 6.29
- Jason Doyle 5.83
- Glen Phillips 5.24
- Tomáš Suchánek 4.78
- Manuel Hauzinger 3.41

King's Lynn

- Tomáš Topinka 9.93
- Oliver Allen 9.03
- Kevin Doolan 7.78
- Troy Batchelor 7.49
- Adam Allott 7.04
- Paul Lee 6.43
- Ashley Jones 5.25
- Jan Jaroš 4.91
- James Brundle 4.75
- Tommy Stange 3.85
- Darren Mallett 3.56

Newcastle

- James Grieves 8.78
- Josef Franc 7.95
- Phil Morris 6.69
- Richard Juul 5.84
- Claus Kristensen 5.28
- Christian Henry 5.09
- Luboš Tomíček Jr. 4.91
- Jamie Robertson 4.89
- James Birkinshaw 4.26
- Kristian Lund 4.20

Newport

- Craig Watson 8.37
- Mads Korneliussen 7.75
- Neil Collins 7.45
- Tony Atkin 6.19
- Michael Coles 5.93
- Kristian Lund 4.77
- Henrik Vedel 4.00
- Lee Dicken 3.64
- Karlis Ezergailis 2.15

Reading

- Matej Žagar 10.43
- Danny Bird 9.38
- Andrew Appleton 7.32
- Zdeněk Simota 6.41
- Mathieu Trésarrieu 5.60
- Richard Wolff 5.52
- Chris Mills 5.29
- Steve Masters 3.39
- Chris Johnson 2.96

Rye House

- Stuart Robson 9.03
- Chris Neath 8.80
- Brent Werner 8.24
- Edward Kennett 8.02
- Danny King 7.57
- Tommy Allen 6.32
- Steve Boxall 4.80
- Luke Bowen 3.82

Sheffield

- Sean Wilson 9.21
- Andre Compton 9.08
- Ricky Ashworth 7.98
- Richard Hall 6.29
- Ben Wilson 6.03
- Kyle Legault 5.53
- Trevor Harding 4.84
- Paul Cooper 4.60

Somerset

- Magnus Zetterström 9.38
- Glenn Cunningham 7.96
- Paul Fry 7.68
- Ritchie Hawkins 6.83
- Jason King 5.04
- Jamie Smith 5.03
- Chris Mills 4.48
- Simon Walker 2.44
- Lee Smart 2.23

Stoke

- Alan Mogridge 8.06
- Robbie Kessler 7.86
- Peter Carr 5.86
- Paul Clews 5.40
- Adam Allott 5.22
- Barrie Evans 4.55
- Luke Priest 3.67
- Rob Grant Jr. 3.04
- Jack Hargreaves 2.81

Workington

- Carl Stonehewer 9.89
- James Wright 7.51
- Kauko Nieminen 7.33
- Tomasz Piszcz 7.10
- Shaun Tacey 7.04
- Scott Robson 6.13
- Kevin Little 5.90
- Jamie Courtney 4.54
- Aidan Collins .4.19
- Scott James 2.2

== See also ==
- List of United Kingdom Speedway League Champions
- Knockout Cup (speedway)
