= 2001 Premier League speedway season =

British motorcycle speedway season

- League: Premier League
- Champions: Newcastle Diamonds
- Knockout Cup: Hull Vikings
- Young Shield: Isle of Wight Islanders
- Premier Trophy: Sheffield Tigers
- Individual: Carl Stonehewer
- Pairs: Workington Comets
- Fours: Workington Comets
- Highest average: Sean Wilson
- Division/s above: 2001 Elite League
- Division/s below: 2001 Conference League

The 2001 Premier League speedway season was the second division of speedway in the United Kingdom and governed by the Speedway Control Bureau (SCB), in conjunction with the British Speedway Promoters' Association (BSPA).

== Season summary ==
The League consisted of 15 teams for the 2001 season with the addition of a new teams, the Trelawny Tigers.

The League was run on a standard format with no play-offs and was won by Newcastle Diamonds.

== League ==
=== Final table ===
Pos		M	W	D	L	F	A	Pts	Bon	Tot
1	Newcastle Diamonds	28	20	1	7	1327	1166	41	12	53
2	Hull Vikings	28	17	3	8	1377	1124	37	13	50
3	Sheffield Tigers	28	18	0	10	1378	1125	36	11	47
4	Isle of Wight Islanders	28	18	0	10	1374	1145	36	11	47
5	Swindon Robins	28	16	3	9	1331	1170	35	10	45
6	Workington Comets	28	16	2	10	1263	1256	34	8	42
7	Exeter Falcons	28	13	2	13	1290	1239	28	8	36
8	Edinburgh Monarchs	28	13	1	14	1257	1242	27	8	35
9	Reading Racers	28	12	3	13	1272	1250	27	6	33
10	Arena Essex Hammers	28	12	2	14	1230	1269	25	5	30
11	Stoke Potters	28	13	1	14	1196	1316	27	3	30
12	Berwick Bandits	28	10	1	17	1204	1317	21	4	25
13	Glasgow Tigers	28	10	0	18	1131	1369	20	3	23
14	Trelawny Tigers	28	6	1	21	1075	1447	13	2	15
15	Newport Wasps	28	6	1	21	1115	1385	13	1	14

=== Fixtures and results ===
Home \ Away	AE	BER	ED	EX	GLA	HV	IOW	ND	NW	RR	SHE	STO	SWI	TT	WOR
Arena Essex Hammers		57–32	51–39	51–39	48–39	43–47	52–38	43–47	61–29	45–45	47–43	56–33	47–43	57–33	43–47
Berwick Bandits	42–48		51–39	51–39	55–35	49–41	43–47	41.5–48.5	52–38	55–35	49–41	57–33	40–50	49–41	58–32
Edinburgh Monarchs	56–34	53–37		51–39	52–38	46–44	51–39	53–36	55–34	54–36	40–49	59–31	47–43	65–25	45–45
Exeter Falcons	56–34	55–39	50–42		56–34	45–45	50–40	51–39	67–23	52–38	44–46	55–35	45–45	60–32	67–24
Glasgow Tigers	42–48	49–41	51–39	47–46		33–57	43–47	46–44	52–38	44–46	42–49	50–40	37–53	49–41	40–50
Hull Vikings	53–37	57–33	42–30	64–26	61–29		53–37	44–46	58–32	47–43	58–32	56–34	52–38	62–27	50–40
Isle of Wight Islanders	59–31	59–31	58–32	60–30	66–24	46–44		57–33	59–31	52–38	56–34	49–41	51–39	64–26	57–33
Newcastle Diamonds	52–38	55–33	54–36	57–33	42–30	48–41	52–37		56–34	49–41	54–36	51–35	57–33	59–31	48–42
Newport Wasps	55–37	45–45	49–40	48–42	42–47	42–48	47–43	44–46		36–54	41–49	49–41	34–55	64–26	44–46
Reading Racers	48–42	49–41	50–40	43–47	55–35	45–45	46–44	42–48	51–39		53–37	51–39	45–45	63–37	38–52
Sheffield Tigers	58–32	55–35	61–28	59–31	67–22	57–34	51–39	61–29	51–21	52–30		58–34	57–33	63–26	53–37
Stoke Potters	49–41	64–27	52–38	51–38	45–44	45–45	53–36	45–44	55–35	48–42	53–36		46–44	54–36	47–42
Swindon Robins	43–29	53–36	55–35	49–41	55–35	50–40	59–31	49–41	52–38	46–44	53–37	65–25		51–39	45–45
Trelawny Tigers	47–43	52–38	41–49	37–53	43–47	44–46	34–58	45–45	47–43	42–48	48–42	62–28	50–40		44–46
Workington Comets	55–35	48–42	47–43	55–35	43–47	47–43	44–45	43–47	50–40	47–43	46–44	50–40	46–44	61–29	

Legend: Blue = home team win; Yellow = draw; Red = away team win.

== Premier League Knockout Cup ==
The 2001 Premier League Knockout Cup was the 34th edition of the Knockout Cup for tier two teams. Hull Vikings were the winners of the competition.

First round

Date	Team one	Score	Team two
18/05	Arena Essex	45-45	Reading
21/05	Reading	48-42	Arena Essex
16/05	Hull	54-36	Trelawny
22/05	Trelawny	43-47	Hull
19/05	Stoke	56-34	Isle of Wight
29/05	Isle of Wight	47-42	Stoke
21/05	Newcastle	55-35	Edinburgh
18/05	Edinburgh	51-39	Newcastle
09/07	Sheffield	58-32	Berwick
19/05	Berwick	47-43	Sheffield
21/05	Exeter	64-26	Newport
24/06	Newport	47-43	Exeter
10/05	Swindon	70-20	Glasgow
20/05	Glasgow	45-42	Swindon

Quarter-finals

Date	Team one	Score	Team two
09/07	Reading	50-40	Exeter
12/07	Exeter	51-39	Reading
04/07	Hull	57-33	Stoke
08/07	Stoke	41-48	Hull
09/07	Newcastle	56-34	Sheffield
12/07	Sheffield	47-43	Newcastle
05/07	Swindon	50-40	Workington
30/06	Workington	47-43	Swindon

Semi-finals

Date	Team one	Score	Team two
18/07	Hull	40-38	Newcastle
23/07	Newcastle	43-47	Hull
13/08	Exeter	52-38	Swindon
12/08	Swindon	51-39	Exeter

=== Final ===
First leg

24 September 2001

Exeter Falcons Seemond Stephens 15 Mark Simmonds 10 Michael Coles 8 Jason Prynne 6 Krister Marsh 5 Lawrence Hare 2 Bobby Eldridge R/R	46 – 44	Hull Vikings Paul Thorp 12 Garry Stead 12 Paul Bentley 9 Ross Brady 6 Mike Smith 3 Jamie Smith 2 David Walsh R/R

County Ground Stadium

Second leg

26 September 2001

Hull Vikings Paul Bentley 12 Jamie Smith 12 Paul Thorp 11 Garry Stead 11 Ross Brady 11 Mike Smith 4 David Walsh R/R	61 – 29	Exeter Falcons Seemond Stephens 15 Mark Simmonds 7 Michael Coles 6 Jason Prynne 1 Krister Marsh 0 Lee Dicken (guest) 0 Bobby Eldridge R/R

Craven Park, Hull

Hull were declared Knockout Cup Champions, winning on aggregate 105–75.

== Premier Trophy ==
North Group

Pos	Team	P	W	D	L	Pts
1	Sheffield	14	11	0	3	22
2	Workington	14	10	0	4	20
3	Newcastle	14	8	1	5	17
4	Edinburgh	14	8	0	6	16
5	Glasgow	14	6	0	8	12
6	Hull	14	5	1	8	11
7	Stoke	14	4	0	10	8
8	Berwick	14	2	2	10	6

South Group

Pos	Team	P	W	D	L	Pts
1	Swindon	12	8	0	4	16
2	Isle of Wight	12	7	1	4	15
3	Reading	12	7	0	5	14
4	Arena Essex	12	6	0	6	12
5	Exeter	12	5	1	6	11
6	Newport	12	4	0	8	8
7	Trelawny	12	4	0	8	8

Home \ Away	BER	ED	GLA	HUL	NEW	SHE	STO	WOR
Berwick		44–45	54–39	45–45	45–45	42–48	48–42	38–52
Edinburgh	62–28		46–43	46–44	43–47	53–36	59–30	46–44
Glasgow	54–36	45–44		52–37	53–37	46–44	59–31	43–47
Hull	56–34	48–42	47–43		57–33	38–52	48–30	43–47
Newcastle	48–41	44–27	51–39	50–40		46–44	42–48	49–41
Sheffield	61–29	52–39	67–22	51–42	48–42		53–37	52–38
Stoke	50–43	43–47	47–43	46–44	35–55	44–45		35–37
Workington	59–31	48–42	48–42	52–38	48–42	37–53	55–35	

Legend: Blue = home team win; Yellow = draw; Red = away team win.

Home \ Away	AE	EX	IOW	NWP	REA	SWI	TRE
Arena Essex		41–37	54–35	51–39	47–42	42–46	51–39
Exeter	54–36		45–45	57–32	50–40	49–40	53–37
Isle of Wight	50–39	57–33		56–34	47–43	48–42	55–35
Newport	52–41	52–38	47–37		43–47	41–48	52–38
Reading	59–31	64–26	44–46	46–44		48–42	68–22
Swindon	58–32	48–41	60–29	52–38	49–40		68–22
Trelawny	44–46	50–39	46–43	43–37	39–51	46–44	

Legend: Blue = home team win; Yellow = draw; Red = away team win.

Semi-final

Team one	Team two	Score
Workington	Swindon	45–45, 36–54
Isle of Wight	Sheffield	50–40, 40–50; 48–42, 37–53

Final

Team one	Team two	Score
Swindon	Sheffield	37–53, 25–65

== Young Shield ==
- End of season competition for the top eight league teams

First round

Team one	Team two	Score
Hull	Workington	48–42, 40–53
Exeter	Isle of Wight	44–46, 27–63
Swindon	Sheffield	49–41, 32–58
Edinburgh	Newcastle	47–43, 44–46

Semi-final

Team one	Team two	Score
Isle of Wight	Sheffield	64–26, 37–52
Edinburgh	Workington	60–30, 48–43

Final

Team one	Team two	Score
Edinburgh	Isle of Wight	48–42, 29–61

== Riders' Championship ==
Carl Stonehewer won the Riders' Championship for the second successive season. The final was held on 9 September at Brandon Stadium.

Pos.	Rider	Pts	Total	SF	Final
1	(England) Carl Stonehewer	1 1 3 1 3	9	2	3
2	(England) Sean Wilson	3 0 3 2 1	9	3	2
3	(Denmark) Bjarne Pedersen	2 3 1 3 3	12	-	1
4	(England) Simon Stead	3 3 3 2 1	12	-	0
5	(Scotland) James Grieves	1 3 2 3 2	11	1	
6	(England) Paul Fry	3 2 1 3 2	11	0	
7	(England) Paul Thorp	3 2 3	8		
8	(England) Steve Masters	1 3 0 0 3	7		
9	(England) Michael Coles	0 1 0 3 3	7		
10	(Sweden) Robert Eriksson	2 2 1 1 1	7		
11	(Australia) Brett Woodifield	2 ex 2 0 2	6		
12	(Czech Republic) Adrian Rymel	2 1 0 2 0	5		
13	(England) Ray Morton	0 2 2 1	5		
14	(England) Leigh Lanham	1 ex 0 2 0	3		
15	(England) Paul Pickering	0 1 1 0 1	3		
16	(Italy) Armando Castagna	ex 0 2 0 0	2		
17	(England) Andrew Moore (res)	2	2		
18	(England) Ritchie Hawkins (res)	1	1		

- f=fell, r-retired, ex=excluded, ef=engine failure t=touched tapes

== Pairs ==
The Premier League Pairs Championship was held at Derwent Park on 14 July. The event was won by Workington Comets for the third successive season.

Group A

- Reading (Gjedde & Castagna)
- Sheffield (Wilson & Kessler)
- Exeter (Coles & Simmonds)
- Newport (Masters & Cunningham)
- Swindon (Fry & Kristensen)

Group B

- Workington (Stonehewer & Karlsson)
- Newcastle (Pedersen & Olsen)
- Isle of Wight (Morton & Bird)
- Arena Essex (White & Lanham)
- Edinburgh (Carr & Eriksson)

Final

- Workington (Stonehewer & Karlsson) bt Newcastle (Olsen & Pedersen)

== Fours ==
Workington Comets won the Premier League Four-Team Championship, which was held on 5 August 2001, at the East of England Arena.

Group A
Pos	Team	Pts	Riders
1	Sheffield	19	
2	Newcastle	13	
3	Hull	11	
4	Reading	5	Gjedde 2, Mullett 2, Castagna 1, Morris 0

Group B
Pos	Team	Pts	Riders
1	Isle of Wight	16	
2	Workington	12	
3	Edinburgh	12	
4	Newport	7	

Final
Pos	Team	Pts	Riders
1	Workington	22	Stonehewer, Collins N
2	Newcastle	21	Pedersen B
3	Sheffield	19	Stead
4	Isle of Wight	10	Swain

== Leading averages ==
Rider	Team	Average
(England) Sean Wilson	Sheffield	10.39
(England) Carl Stonehewer	Workington	10.29
(Denmark) Bjarne Pedersen	Newcastle	10.16
(Sweden) Peter Carr	Edinburgh	10.01
(England) Simon Stead	Sheffield	9.98
(England) Ray Morton	Isle of Wight	9.42
(England) Michael Coles	Exeter	9.19
(Italy) Armando Castagna	Reading	9.05
(England) Paul Thorp	Hull	9.03
(Sweden) Peter Ingvar Karlsson	Workington	9.03

== Riders & final averages ==
Arena Essex

- Leigh Lanham 8.84
- Colin White 8.08
- Troy Pratt 7.67
- Shaun Tacey 7.20
- Lee Dicken 5.47
- Luke Clifton 4.00
- Andy Galvin 3.40
- Brent Collyer 3.24
- Lee Herne 2.91
- Barrie Evans 2.63

Berwick

- Adrian Rymel 7.05
- Scott Lamb 6.96
- Scott Robson 6.84
- Michal Makovský 6.73
- David Meldrum 6.58
- Wayne Carter 5.49
- Bevan Compton .27
- Josef Franc 5.25
- Will Beveridge 4.76
- David McAllan 2.88

Edinburgh

- Peter Carr 10.01
- Jan Andersen 8.03
- Robert Eriksson 7.83
- Daniel Andersson 7.01
- Christian Henry 5.15
- Blair Scott 5.08
- Ben Shields 4.73
- Derek Sneddon 3.77
- Rory Schlein 1.29

Exeter

- Michael Coles 9.19
- Mark Simmonds 8.05
- Lawrence Hare 7.74
- Seemond Stephens 7.62
- Bobby Eldridge 5.28
- Krister Marsh 5.02
- Matt Cambridge 4.13
- Jason Prynne 3.37
- David Osborn 0.47

Glasgow

- James Grieves 8.47
- Les Collins 8.07
- Emiliano Sanchez 7.25
- Mark Courtney 6.53
- Stuart Swales 5.33
- Henning Bager 4.92
- Simon Cartwright 4.33
- Aidan Collins 4.00
- Derek Sneddon 3.66
- Scott Courtney 1.71

Hull

- Paul Thorp 9.03
- Paul Bentley 8.49
- David Walsh 8.06
- Garry Stead 8.00
- Ross Brady 6.98
- Lee Dicken 6.58
- Jamie Smith 5.27
- Mike Smith 4.83
- Justin Elkins 3.05

Isle of Wight

- Ray Morton 9.42
- Danny Bird 8.79
- Adam Shields 8.61
- Davey Watt 6.47
- Sebastien Trésarrieu 6.46
- Scott Swain 6.16
- Glen Phillips 4.42

Newcastle

- Bjarne Pedersen 10.16
- Andre Compton 8.13
- Jesper Olsen 8.11
- Kevin Little 7.58
- Richard Juul 5.26
- Rob Grant Jr 5.02
- James Birkinshaw 4.25
- Grant MacDonald 3.11

Newport

- Anders Henriksson 8.95
- Glenn Cunningham 7.55
- Steve Masters 7.47
- Emil Lindqvist 6.92
- Scott Smith 6.32
- Chris Neath 6.30
- Krister Marsh 4.57
- Carl Wilkinson 4.50
- Tommy Palmer 4.48
- Nick Simmons 3.48
- Rob Finlow 1.88

Reading

- Armando Castagna 9.05
- Charlie Gjedde 8.94
- Phil Morris 8.42
- Dave Mullett 7.77
- Paul Clews 7.39
- Shane Colvin 5.38
- Tommy Palmer 3.51
- Chris Schramm 2.82
- Brendon McKay 0.94

Sheffield

- Sean Wilson 10.39
- Simon Stead 9.98
- Robbie Kessler 8.83
- Scott Smith 7.18
- Lee Complin 5.50
- Adam Allott 4.86
- Andrew Moore 4.81
- Lee Redmond 4.64
- Lee Hodgson 3.19

Stoke

- Jan Staechmann 8.85
- Paul Pickering 8.21
- Tony Atkin 7.26
- Mark Burrows 6.11
- Jon Armstrong 4.79
- Wayne Broadhurst 4.47
- Dean Felton 3.91
- Will Beveridge 3.41
- Grant MacDonald 3.06
- Neil Painter 1.37

Swindon

- Paul Fry 8.27
- Claus Kristensen 7.77
- Oliver Allen 7.73
- Alan Mogridge 7.63
- Martin Dixon 7.11
- Alun Rossiter 7.10
- Mark Steel 6.20
- Ritchie Hawkins 4.52

Trelawny

- Chris Harris 7.82
- Pavel Ondrašík 6.64
- Brett Woodifield 6.59
- Mark Courtney 6.21
- Graeme Gordon 5.55
- Kenny Olsson 5.00
- Richard Wolff 5.00
- Steffen Mell 4.20
- Gary Phelps 4.00
- Simon Phillips 3.55
- Lee Herne 3.28

Workington

- Carl Stonehewer 10.29
- Peter Ingvar Karlsson 9.03
- Neil Collins 7.67
- Mick Powell 7.51
- Rusty Harrison 7.25
- Lee Smethills 4.39
- James Mann 3.03
- David McAllan 2.66
- Craig Branney 1.55

== See also ==
- List of United Kingdom Speedway League Champions
- Knockout Cup (speedway)
