= 1994 British League season =

British motorcycle speedway season

- League: British League
- No. of competitors: 11
- Champions: Poole Pirates
- Knockout Cup: Eastbourne Eagles
- Fours: Poole Pirates
- Individual: Sam Ermolenko
- Highest average: Per Jonsson
- Division/s below: British League (Div 2); British League (Div 3)

The 1994 British League season was the 60th season of the top tier of speedway in the United Kingdom and the 30th and final season known as the British League.

== Summary ==
Poole Pirates dominated the league and won the title finishing 15 points clear of nearest rivals Eastbourne Eagles. The Pirates last top league success had been back in 1969 and it was thanks to solid performances throughout the season from their Australian pair; new signing from Swindon Jason Crump and Craig Boyce. They were backed up by Norwegian Lars Gunnestad and Londoner Steve Schofield.

== Final table ==
Pos	Team	PL	W	D	L	BP	Pts
1	Poole Pirates	40	30	1	9	16	77
2	Eastbourne Eagles	40	23	2	15	14	62
3	Wolverhampton Wolves	40	20	2	18	12	54
4	Coventry Bees	40	19	3	18	11	52
5	King's Lynn Stars	40	20	1	19	10	51
6	Ipswich Witches	40	19	2	19	10	50
7	Bradford Dukes	40	18	1	21	11	48
8	Arena Essex Hammers	40	19	0	21	8	46
9	Cradley Heath Heathens	40	16	3	21	7	42
10	Reading Racers	40	14	2	24	6	36
11	Belle Vue Aces	40	13	1	26	5	32

M = Matches; W = Wins; D = Draws; L = Losses; Pts = Total Points

=== Fixtures and results ===
A Fixtures

Home \ Away	AE	BV	BRA	COV	CH	EAS	IPS	KL	PP	RR	WOL
Arena Essex		54–42	51–45	51–45	51–45	47–49	54–42	47–49	47–43	52–44	50–46
Belle Vue	53–43		53–43	50–45	49–47	46–50	51–45	43–53	42–54	42–54	55–41
Bradford	55–41	54–41		49–47	56–40	50–46	51–45	56–40	52–44	51–45	54–42
Coventry	59–37	51–45	57–39		52–43	61–35	49–47	57–39	45–51	45–51	50–46
Cradley Heath	40–55	69–27	51–45	52–44		55–41	50–46	58–38	43–29	52–44	47–49
Eastbourne	50–45	57–39	55–41	58–38	53–25		62–34	46–32	61–35	51–45	63–32
Ipswich	51–45	49–47	50–46	57–39	48–48	50–46		48–48	44–52	59–34	44–52
King's Lynn	55–41	52–43	56–39	46–50	53–43	61–35	51–44		49–46	60–36	53–43
Poole	50–46	63–33	53–43	50–46	58–37	54–42	53–43	52–44		50–46	51–45
Reading	51–45	56–40	48–48	48–48	58–38	60–36	49–47	44–52	50–46		52.5–43.5
Wolverhampton	51–45	52–44	51–45	55–41	63–33	48–48	58–37	52–43	42–54	54–42	

Legend: Blue = home team win; Yellow = draw; Red = away team win.

B Fixtures

Home \ Away	AE	BV	BRA	COV	CH	EAS	IPS	KL	PP	RR	WOL
Arena Essex		53–43	54–41	57–39	44–39	56–40	50–46	50–45	58–38	52–43	59–37
Belle Vue	53–43		53–43	44–52	47–49	51–45	51–45	42–54	45–48	59–37	48–8
Bradford	62–34	46–50		42–36	50–46	61–35	46–50	56–40	36–58	53–43	51–45
Coventry	52–44	54–41	56–40		53–43	36–36	46–50	58–38	46–50	54–42	50–46
Cradley Heath	53–43	47–49	46–50	48–48		54–42	53–43	57–39	48–48	61–35	47–46
Eastbourne	62–34	66–30	57–38	60–36	50–46		59–37	58–38	0–80	63–33	55–41
Ipswich	64–32	57–39	51–45	60–36	56–40	50–46		50–46	54–42	63–33	56–39
King's Lynn	51–45	56–40	50–46	0–80	51–45	0–80	42–4		47–49	57–39	53–43
Poole	65–31	74–22	38–34	61–35	50–34	56–40	50–46	71–25		61–35	61–35
Reading	55–41	51–45	50–46	47–48	44–52	42–54	51–45	45–51	46–50		54–41
Wolverhampton	55–41	49–44	55–41	55–41	48–47	50–46	57–39	54–42	53–43	63–33	

Legend: Blue = home team win; Yellow = draw; Red = away team win.

== British League Knockout Cup ==
The 1994 British League Knockout Cup was the 56th edition of the Knockout Cup for tier one teams. Eastbourne Eagles were the winners for a third consecutive year.

First round

Date	Team one	Score	Team two
23/04	Eastbourne	59-37	Belle Vue
23/04	Kings Lynn	58-38	Poole
21/04	Ipswich	61-33	Cradley Heath
20/04	Poole	56-40	Kings Lynn
16/04	Cradley Heath	70-25	Ipswich
13/04	Belle Vue	47-49	Eastbourne

Quarter-finals

Date	Team one	Score	Team two
28/06	Coventry	58-37	Reading
15/06	Kings Lynn	61-35	Bradford
14/06	Bradford	49-47	Kings Lynn
28/05	Eastbourne	51-45	Wolverhampton
23/05	Reading	52-43	Coventry
16/05	Wolverhampton	50-46	Eastbourne
14/05	Cradley Heath	59-24	Arena Essex
13/05	Arena Essex	52-44	Cradley Heath

Semi-finals

Date	Team one	Score	Team two
31/07	Eastbourne	55-41	Kings Lynn
30/07	Kings Lynn	55-41	Eastbourne
16/07	Coventry	48-47	Cradley Heath
02/07	Cradley Heath	55-41	Coventry
29/08	Kings Lynn	45-51	Eastbourne
28/08	Eastbourne	62-33	Kings Lynn

Final

First leg

23 October 1994

Eastbourne Eagles Martin Dugard 14 Dean Barker 12 Stefan Danno 12 Paul Dugard 8 David Norris 7 Stefan Andersson 5 Scott Swain 1	59 - 37	Cradley Heath Greg Hancock 13 Peter Nahlin 9 Billy Hamill 7 Simon Cross 6 Jonathan Forsgren 2 Scott Smith 0 Lance Sealey 0

Arlington Stadium

Second leg

31 October 1994

Cradley Heath Simon Cross 14 Billy Hamill 14 Peter Nahlin 9 Greg Hancock 7 Jonathan Forsgren 4 Scott Smith 1 Lance Sealey 0	49 - 47	Eastbourne Eagles Martin Dugard 10 Dean Barker 10 Stefan Danno 9 David Norris 8 Stefan Andersson 4 Paul Dugard 3 Scott Swain 3

Dudley Wood Stadium

Eastbourne were declared Knockout Cup Champions, winning on aggregate 106-86.

== Fours ==
Poole Pirates won the fours championship final, held at the East of England Arena on 7 August.

Final

Pos	Team	Pts	Riders
1	Poole	28	Crump 9, Boyce 7, Rossiter 6, Schofield 6
2	Cradley	20	Nahlin 8, Cross 7, Hamill 3, Hancock 2
3	Eastbourne	15	Norris 5, Barker 4, Dugard 4, Andersson 2
4	Coventry	9	Jørgensen 6, Andersen 2, Olsen 1, Tacey 0, Spicer 0

== Riders' Championship ==
Sam Ermolenko won the British League Riders' Championship. It was held in Swindon on the 9th of October.

Pos.	Rider	Heat Scores	Total
1	(United States) Sam Ermolenko	3 3 3 3 3	15
2	(Denmark) Hans Nielsen	3 3 3 1 3	13
3	(England) Martin Dugard	1 3 3 2 2	11
4	(England) Mark Loram	2 1 1 3 3	10
5	(England) David Norris	1 2 1 3 2	9
6	(Australia) Leigh Adams	0 0 3 3 3	9
7	(United States) Greg Hancock	3 2 1 1 2	9
8	(Australia) Craig Boyce	2 3 2 1 1	9
9	(England) Joe Screen	3 0 2 2 0	7
10	(England) Gary Havelock	1 1 2 2 1	7
11	(Sweden) Peter Karlsson	2 2 2 0 1	7
12	(England) Chris Louis	2 1 1 2 0	6
13	(Australia) Jason Crump	1 2 0 0 2	5
14	(England) Michael Coles	0 0 0 1 0	1
15	(England) Paul Bentley	0 1 0 0 1	2
16	(England) Dave Mullett	0 0 0 0 0	0

- ef=engine failure, f=fell, x=excluded r-retired

== Leading averages ==
Rider	Team	Average
(Sweden) Per Jonsson	Reading	10.41
(Sweden) Tony Rickardsson	Ipswich	10.00
(Denmark) Hans Nielsen	Coventry	9.98
(United States) Sam Ermolenko	Wolverhampton	9.83
(Australia) Leigh Adams	Arena Essex	9.79
(England) Joe Screen	Bradford	9.65
(Sweden) Henrik Gustafsson	Belle Vue	9.64
(England) Gary Havelock	Bradford	9.59
(England) Mark Loram	Kings Lynn	9.46
(England) Martin Dugard	Eastbourne	9.33
(Australia) Jason Crump	Poole	9.30
(United States) Greg Hancock	Cradley Heath	9.29
(England) David Norris	Eastbourne	9.18
(Australia) Craig Boyce	Poole	9.08

== Riders & final averages ==
Arena Essex

- (Australia) Leigh Adams 9.79
- (England) Kelvin Tatum 8.26
- (England) Paul Hurry 6.28
- (Sweden) Christer Rohlén 5.99
- (England) Troy Pratt 4.78
- (Sweden) Mikael Teurnberg 4.71
- (England) Colin White 4.14
- (Denmark) Jan Pedersen 4.00
- (England) Robert Ledwith 2.57
- (England) Nigel Leaver 2.00

Belle Vue

- (Sweden) Henka Gustaffson 9.64
- (Sweden) Niklas Klingberg 7.79
- (Australia) Jason Lyons 7.14
- (United States) Chris Manchester 6.13
- (England) Michael Coles 5.97
- (Denmark) Frede Schött 5.94
- (England) Peter Carr 5.84
- (England) Paul Smith 5.05
- (England) Mark Burrows 3.00

Bradford

- (England) Joe Screen 9.65
- (England) Gary Havelock 9.59
- (England) Paul Thorp 7.32
- (Sweden) Jimmy Nilsen 7.06
- (England) Garry Stead 4.62
- (England) Paul Pickering 3.10
- (New Zealand) Mark Thorpe 3.07
- (England) Simon Green 2.68

Coventry

- (Denmark) Hans Nielsen 9.98
- (Denmark) John Jørgensen 8.46
- (Denmark) Brian Andersen 8.10
- (England) Andy Smith 6.45
- (Denmark) Jacob Olsen 5.83
- (England) Shaun Tacey 4.24
- (England) Darren Spicer 3.23
- (England) Justin Elkins 1.57
- (England) Jason Gage 1.57

Cradley Heath

- (United States) Greg Hancock 9.29
- (United States) Billy Hamill 8.68
- (Sweden) Peter Nahlin 8.64
- (Denmark) Morten Andersen 8.00
- (England) Simon Cross 7.78
- (England) Scott Smith 4.98
- (Sweden) Jonathan Forsgren 4.40
- (England) David Clarke 3.94
- (England) Justin Walker 1.93
- (England) Lance Sealey 1.27
- (England) Anthony Boyd 1.04

Eastbourne

- (England) Martin Dugard 9.33
- (England) David Norris 9.18
- (England) Dean Barker 8.98
- (Sweden) Stefan Dannö 7.41
- (Sweden) Stefan Andersson 6.30
- (England) Paul Dugard 4.42
- (England) Darren Shand 3.18
- (England) Darren Grayling 2.98

Ipswich

- (England) Chris Louis 8.34
- (New Zealand) Mitch Shirra 8.08
- (England) Jeremy Doncaster 7.92
- (Australia) Shane Parker 7.07
- (England) Ben Howe 6.14
- (England) Savalas Clouting 5.49
- (England) Leigh Lanham 4.41

King's Lynn

- (England) Mark Loram 9.46
- (United States) Bobby Ott 8.33
- (England) Richard Knight 6.96
- (Czech Republic) Bohumil Brhel 6.68
- (Czech Republic) Tomáš Topinka 5.75
- (England) Emmerson Fairweather 4.37
- (Denmark) Jens Rasmussen 4.00
- (England) Robert Ledwith 3.36

Poole

- (Australia) Jason Crump 9.30
- (Australia) Craig Boyce 9.08
- (Norway) Lars Gunnestad 8.77
- (England) Steve Schofield 7.92
- (Sweden) Jorgen Johansson 5.85
- (England) Alun Rossiter 5.71
- (England) Steve Masters 3.44
- (England) Justin Elkins 2.37

Reading

- (Sweden) Per Jonsson 10.41
- (Italy) Armando Castagna 8.44
- (England) Dave Mullett 7.65
- (Australia) Shane Bowes 5.83
- (England) Ray Morton 5.15
- (England) Phil Morris 5.08
- (Denmark) Jan Pedersen 4.43
- (England) Matthew Cross 2.61

Wolverhampton

- (United States) Sam Ermolenko 9.83
- (Sweden) Peter Karlsson 8.52
- (Sweden) Mikael Karlsson 7.47
- (United States) Charles Ermolenko 6.94
- (England) Gordon Kennett 5.28
- (England) Andy Grahame 4.40
- (England) Wayne Carter 4.34
- (England) Tony Atkin 2.82

== See also ==
- List of United Kingdom Speedway League Champions
- Knockout Cup (speedway)
