= 1997 Swedish speedway season =

Motorcycle racing competition

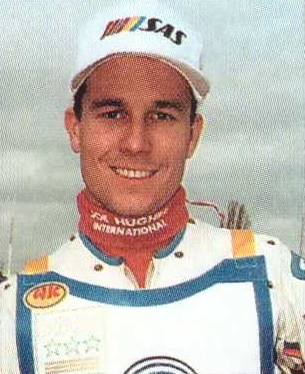
- Smederna rider Billy Hamill was second in the league averages behind Tony Rickardsson

The 1997 Swedish speedway season was the 1997 season of motorcycle speedway in Sweden.

== Individual ==
=== Individual Championship ===
The 1997 Swedish Individual Speedway Championship final was held in Vetlanda on 16 August. Tony Rickardsson won the Swedish Championship for the third time.

Pos	Rider	Team	Points	Total
1	Tony Rickardsson	Valsarna	(3,3,3,3,3)	15
2	Henrik Gustafsson	Indianerna	(3,3,3,2,1)	12
3	Peter Karlsson	Örnarna	(w,3,3,2,2)	10+3
4	Mikael Karlsson	Örnarna	(2,w,3,2,3)	10+2
5	Stefan Andersson	Team Svelux	(3,0,2,1,2)	9
6	Claes Ivarsson	Vetlanda	(0,2,2,3,2)	9
7	Niklas Klingberg	Örnarna	(2,1,0,3,2)	8
8	Peter Nahlin	Vargarna	(2,3,1,1,1)	8
9	Niklas Karlsson	Vargarna	(0,1,0,3,3)	7
10	Peter Ingvar Karlsson	Indianerna	(3,2,1,0,0)	6
11	Jimmy Nilsen	Rospiggarna	(1,2,2,0,1)	6
12	Conny Ivarsson	Vetlanda	(1,2,2,1,w)	6
13	Magnus Zetterström	Smederna	(2,0,1,2,0)	5
14	Per Wester	Valsarna	(1,1,0,0,2)	4
15	Andreas Jonsson	Rospiggarna	(1,1,0,1,1)	4
16	Benny Olsson	Vargarna	(u,0,1,0,0)	1

Key

- points per race - 3 for a heat win, 2 for 2nd, 1 for third, 0 for last
- +3 won race off, +2 2nd in race off, +1, 3rd in race off, +0 last in race off
- t - tape touching excluded
- u - fell
- w - excluded

=== U21 Championship ===
Peter Ingvar Karlsson won the U21 championship.

== Team ==
=== Team Championship ===
Rospiggarna won the Elitserien and were declared the winners of the Swedish Speedway Team Championship for the second time. The Rospiggarna team included Greg Hancock, Jimmy Nilsen, Erik Stenlund and Andreas Jonsson.

Dackarna changed their name to Team Svelux and Gnistorna withdrew from Division 1B. Leading positions in Division 1 North & South groups determined Division 1A & 1B leagues.

Kaparna and Nässjö won the first division leagues respectively.

Elitserien
Pos	Team	Pts
1	Rospiggarna	29
2	Valsarna	29
3	Örnarna	29
4	Vargarna	20
5	Bysarna	17
6	Smederna	16
7	Vetlanda	15
8	Västervik	12
9	Indianerna	9
10	Team Svelux	4

Div 1A
Pos	Team	Pts
1	Kaparna	10
2	Masarna	8
3	Karlstad	6
4	Filbyterna	0

Div 1B
Pos	Team	Pts
1	Nässjö	10
2	Getingarna	10
3	Korparna	2
4	Team Viking	2
5	Gnistorna	withdrew

== See also ==
- Speedway in Sweden
