= Jonathan Forsgren =

Swedish speedway rider

- Born: 12 June 1973 (age 53); Karlstad, Sweden
- Nationality: Swedish

Career history

Sweden
- 1991–1992, 1996–2002: Karlstad
- 1993–1994: Valsarna

Great Britain
- 1994–1995: Cradley Heathens

Individual honours
- 1993: Swedish U21 silver

Team honours
- 1995: Premier League Four-Team Championship

Jonathan Rolf Forsgren (born 12 June 1973) is a former motorcycle speedway rider from Sweden.

== Career ==
Forsgren came to prominence when he won the silver medal at the 1993 Swedish Junior Speedway Championship. He started racing in the British leagues during the 1994 British League season, when riding for the Cradley Heath Heathens.

During the 1995 Premier League speedway season, Forsgren was part of the Cradley four that won the Premier League Four-Team Championship, which was held on 6 August 1995, at the East of England Arena.

Forsgren returned to Sweden and rode for one of his former clubs, Karlstad, during the 1996 Swedish speedway season.

Forsgren retired from speedway in 2002 and underwent a career with trade unions.
