= Kenny Olsson =

Swedish speedway rider

- Born: 3 June 1977; Stockholm, Sweden
- Died: 8 June 2007 (aged 30)
- Nationality: Swedish

Career history

Sweden
- 1994: Gamarna
- 1995-1996: Eskilstuna
- 1997-1998: Västervik
- 1999: Bysarna
- 2000, 2004: Smederna
- 2000: Lindarna
- 2002: Torshälla
- 2003: Team Bikab
- 2005-2006: Hammarby Bajen
- 2007: Vargarna

Great Britain
- 2001: Trelawny Tigers
- 2002: Glasgow Tigers

Individual honours
- 2004, 2005: Xtreme International Ice Racing

Börje Kenny Olsson (3 June 1977 – 8 June 2007), was a Swedish speedway racer.

== Career ==
Olsson rode in the United Kingdom for the Trelawny Tigers in 2001 and for the Glasgow Tigers in 2002 in the Premier League. In 2004, he was pursued by Newcastle Diamonds in a deal that did not materialise.

Olsson competed regularly in the Xtreme International Ice Racing series (ice speedway) in the United States, winning the series in 2004 and 2005.

On 8 June 2007, Olsson died in a hospital after a crash the day before at the Norrköping Motorstadion, while racing for Vargarna in the Swedish Elite League, had left him with serious head injuries.

== See also ==
- Rider deaths in motorcycle speedway
