= Jesper Kristiansen (speedway rider) =

Danish speedway rider (born 1985)

- Born: 27 July 1985 (age 41); Givskud, Denmark
- Nationality: Danish

Career history

Denmark
- 2002–2011: Holsted
- 2003–2011: Grindsted
- 2012: Esbjerg

Great Britain
- 2008–2009: Stoke Potters
- 2011: Plymouth Devils

Jesper Viftrup Kristiansen (born 27 July 1985) is a former motorcycle speedway rider from Denmark. He is not to be confused with Jesper Søgaard-Kristiansen (another Danish speedway rider who raced during the same time).

== Speedway career ==
Kristiansen rode in the top tier of British Speedway when making an appearance riding for the Wolverhampton Wolves during the 2009 Elite League speedway season. He began his British career riding for Stoke Potters in 2008.
