= Peter Ingvar Karlsson =

Swedish speedway rider

- Born: 12 July 1976 (age 50); Säffle, Sweden
- Nationality: Swedish

Career history

Sweden
- 1997: Indianerna
- 1998–2001: Masarna
- 2002–2004: Valsarna

Great Britain
- 1999–2003: Workington Comets

Individual honours
- 1997: Swedish U21 Champion

Team honours
- 2001: Premier League Pairs winner

Peter Ingvar Karlsson (born 12 July 1976) is a former motorcycle speedway rider from Sweden.

== Career ==
Karlsson came to prominence when he won the 1997 Swedish Junior Speedway Championship, during the 1997 Swedish speedway season.

Karlsson started his British leagues career during the 1999 Premier League speedway season, where he rode for Workington Comets. The following season, he improved his average to 8.69.

In 2001, Karlsson recorded a 9.03 average during the 2001 Premier League speedway season and partnered Carl Stonehewer, when the pair won the Premier League Pairs Championship for Workington at Derwent Park on 14 July. After a full season in 2002 he rode just a couple of times for Workington in his final season in Britain, which was 2003.
