= Lee Complin =

British speedway rider

- Born: 17 November 1984 (age 42); Cowling, Craven; North Yorkshire
- Nationality: British (English)

Career history
- 2001, 2002: Sheffield
- 2002, 2007: Belle Vue
- 2007–2009: Stoke
- 2007, 2009: Peterborough
- 2009: Eastbourne
- 2009: Wolverhampton
- 2010–2012: Berwick
- 2011: King's Lynn
- 2022: Newcastle
- 2022: Plymouth
- 2023–2024: Glasgow
- 2023: Mildenhall

Team honours
- 2023: SGB Championship winner
- 2012: Premier League Fours winner
- 2023: NDL Knockout Cup

Peter Lee Complin (born 17 November 1984) is a Motorcycle speedway rider from England.

== Speedway career ==
Complin began his British career riding for Sheffield Tigers during the 2001 Premier League speedway season. The following year, he also rode for Belle Vue Aces in the top tier of British Speedway. In 2007, he joined Stoke Potters where he stayed for three seasons peaking with a 7.95 average. He was named Stoke's 2007 rder of the year.

Complin also made appearances for both Peterborough Panthers and Wolverhampton Wolves during the 2009 Elite League speedway season.

Complin moved to the Berwick Bandits for the 2010, 2011 and 2012 seasons before leaving speedway for nearly ten years. He was part of the Berwick team that won the Premier League Four-Team Championship, held on 15 July 2012, at the East of England Arena.

In 2021, Complin made a surprise comeback and signed for Newcastle Diamonds for the SGB Championship 2022 but Newcastle folded in June resulting in Complin signing for Plymouth Gladiators in August and he finished the 2022 season with them.

In 2023, Complin signed for Glasgow Tigers for the SGB Championship 2023, where he won the league title. He also signed for Mildenhall Fen Tigers for the 2023 NDL. In 2023, he helped Mildenhall win the Knockout Cup and was named the team's captain.

Complin re-signed for Glasgow for the 2024 season but was suspended for 20 months for failing a drugs test.
