= Stoke Potters =

British motorcycle speedway team

Club information
- Track address: Sun Street Stadium (1929–1963); Loomer Road Stadium (1973–2019)
- Country: England
- Founded: 1929
- Closed: 2019

Club facts
- Colours: Red and White
- Track size: 312 metres (341 yd)
- Track record time: 60.5s
- Track record date: 8 August 2009, 26 September 2009
- Track record holder: Ty Proctor, Steve Johnston

Major team honours
National League Fours (tier 2)	1990
National League Pairs (tier 2)	1984, 1988, 1989
National League Div 3 (tier 3)
Div 3 National Trophy (tier 3)	1949
NDL Fours (tier 3)	2019
National League Pairs (tier 3)	2011, 2014

The Stoke Potters previously the Hanley Potters were a British speedway team. As Hanley Potters they raced at the Sun Street Stadium from 1929 to 1963 and as Stoke, the team raced at Loomer Road Stadium in Newcastle-under-Lyme from 1973 to 2019.

== History ==
=== Origins & 1920s ===
In March 1929, British Speedways Ltd agreed a season lease with Northern Greyhound Racers (Hanley) Ltd (the owners of the recently constructed Sun Street Stadium in Hanley) for the introduction of speedway during 1929. Hanley were named as inaugural members of the 1929 Speedway English Dirt Track League and hosted their first home league match against Burnley on 18 May. However, they withdrew before the end of the season and their results were expunged.

=== 1930s ===
Ten years after the last appearance of speedway in Stoke, a team re-surfaced at the Sun Street stadium. The Stoke team with the nickname 'Potters' being used for the first time, joined the 1939 Speedway National League Division Two, under the promotion of the stadium owners. Unfortunately once again the team failed to end the season, withdrawing in early July 1939.

=== 1940s ===
Following an eight year absence, the speedway returned on 8 May 1947 and the Hanley Potters finally completed a campaign, finishing 6th in the eight team third division. Just two years later in 1949, Hanley won the double of National League Division Three and Div 3 National Trophy. The Potters were led by riders such as Vic Pitcher, Les Jenkins and Ken Adams and the club attracted crowds of over 12,000.

=== 1950s ===
Hanley struggled in the second division during 1950 before returning to division 3 in 1951. The team raced as Stoke instead of Hanley during the years 1952 and 1953, which saw a poor run of results. The promoters Miles and Galloway subsequently closed the team down, continuing the trend of the club's history of being unable to compete in league speedway on a regular basis.

=== 1960s ===
With the creation of the Provincial League in 1960, the Potters returned under the promotion of Reg Fearman and Mike Parker. Fearman also rode for the club and Ken Adams returned during a period when Stoke enjoyed a solid four year spell from 1960 to 1963, culminating with the runner-up position behind Wolverhampton Wolves in 1963. Riders Colin Pratt and Peter Jarman starred in 1963.

However, the Sun Street track closed in 1963, because the greyhound stadium owners sold the site to a garage business and the speedway was shut down for the fourth time in club's history.

=== 1970s ===
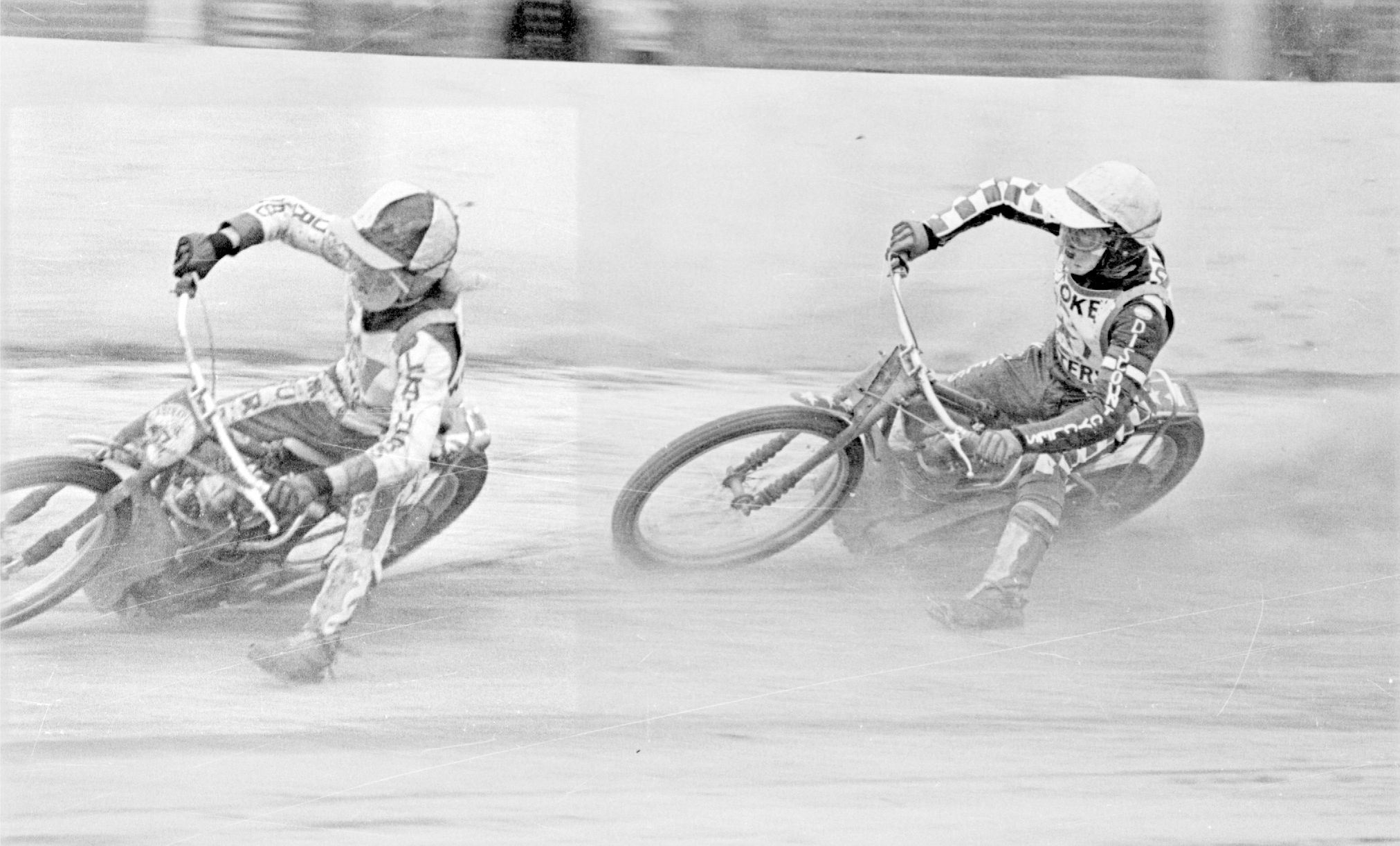
Stoke in action during 1976

In late 1971, Midlands' businessman Russell Bragg applied for and received planning permission from the Newcastle Borough Council for the construction of a new Loomer Road Stadium in Chesterton, at a cost of £200,000. The first speedway match at the track took place on 11 April 1973 in front of 6,500 supporters. The team were known as the Chesterton Potters for the 1973 season.

The club finally experienced continuity and would feature in the National League for a prolonged period. The 1970s saw contrasting fortunes for the Potters and number one riders included Mike Broadbank, Alan Molyneux, Les Collins and Ian Gledhill, the latter winning the 1979 Riders' Championship.

=== 1980s ===
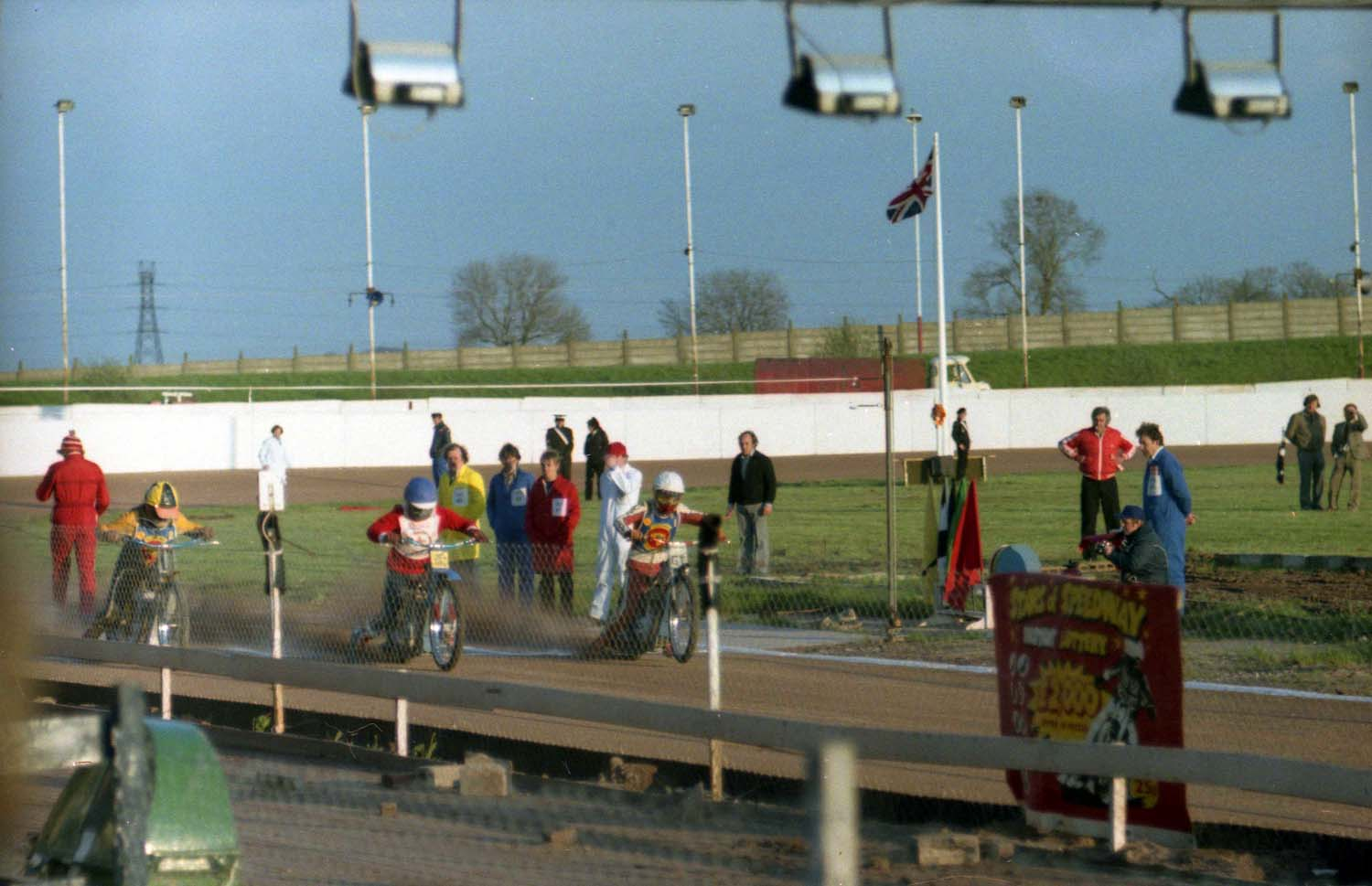
Stoke vs Oxford 1981

The Potters struggled in the league from 1980 to 1983 but finished 3rd in 1984 after signing Nigel Crabtree and Paul Thorp to support Tom Owen. Crabtree and Owen went on to win the National League Pairs held at Hackney Wick Stadium on 30 June.

The remainder of the decade resulted in much improved seasons, with the Potters competing well. Successes included Paul Thorp winning the 1986 Riders' Championship, Graham Jones and Steve Bastable winning the 1988 National League Pairs and Crabtree and Eric Monaghan winning the 1989 Pairs.

=== 1990s ===
The 1990s began well with the Potters team of Monaghan, Crabtree, Louis Carr and Chris Cobby, claiming the Fours championship final, held at the East of England Showground on 22 July.

After two more seasons in the second division from 1991 to 1992, the Potters folded after promoter Dave Tattum failed to gain funding for the 1993 season. The team rejoined the third tier in 1994.

In 1996, the team rode as the Cradley & Stoke Heathens in the merged top division called the Premier League. Cradley Heath had been displaced from their base at Dudley Wood Stadium. From 1997 to 1999, Stoke raced as a single club and returned to the second tier, which retained the Premier League name.

=== 2000s ===
The new millennium started a full decade of Premier League speedway, with the Potters reaching a best position of fourth in 2004. However, the decade was underwhelming with the team failing to achieve any notable success.

=== 2010s ===
In November 2010, a major decision was taken by the club's promotion. The team withdrew from Premier League racing to drop a division and compete in the National League, speedway's third tier. The club had been struggling financially for the last couple of seasons and the move was made in order to stabilise finances.

The 2011 season saw the club top the National League table by seven points but injuries struck key riders and Stoke were beaten in the play-off semi finals. Some consolation was taken when Tim Webster and Simon Lambert won the National League Pairs Championship. From 2012 to 2018, the Potters continued to race in the National League and Ben Wilson and Jon Armstrong won the 2014 Pairs Championship.

The 2019 season ended with the Potters winning the fours championship at Loomer Road but it would be the last speedway season at Loomer Road because the site was sold, the team disbanded after the season and the stadium was demolished during June 2022.

== Season summary ==
Extended content

Year and league	Position	Notes
1929 Speedway English Dirt Track League	N/A	withdrew, results expunged
1939 Speedway National League	6th	withdrew, fixtures taken over by Belle Vue Aces reserves
1947 Speedway National League Division Three	6th	
1948 Speedway National League Division Three	5th	
1949 Speedway National League Division Three	1st	champions and National Trophy winners (div 3)
1950 Speedway National League Division Two	14th	
1951 Speedway National League Division Two	9th	
1952 Speedway National League Division Two	10th	
1953 Speedway National League Division Two	9th	
1960 Provincial Speedway League	5th	
1961 Provincial Speedway League	3rd	
1962 Provincial Speedway League	4th	
1963 Provincial Speedway League	2nd	
1973 British League Division Two season	13th	rode as Chesterton Potters
1974 British League Division Two season	13th	
1975 New National League season	3rd	
1976 National League season	11th	
1977 National League season	19th	
1978 National League season	8th	
1979 National League season	13th	
1980 National League season	16th	
1981 National League season	15th	
1982 National League season	18th	
1983 National League season	17th	
1984 National League season	3rd	NL Pairs
1985 National League season	8th	
1986 National League season	5th	
1987 National League season	4th	
1988 National League season	7th	NL Pairs
1989 National League season	10th	NL Pairs
1990 National League season	8th	NL Fours
1991 British League Division Two season	10th	
1992 British League Division Two season	8th	
1994 British League Division Three	3rd	
1995 Academy League	2nd	
1996 Premier League speedway season	5th	rode as Cradley & Stoke Heathens
1997 Premier League speedway season	12th	
1998 Premier League speedway season	13th	
1999 Premier League speedway season	10th	
2000 Premier League speedway season	7th	
2001 Premier League speedway season	11th	
2002 Premier League speedway season	7th	
2003 Premier League speedway season	15th	
2004 Premier League speedway season	4th	
2005 Premier League speedway season	14th	
2006 Premier League speedway season	10th	
2007 Premier League speedway season	11th	
2008 Premier League speedway season	13th	
2009 Premier League speedway season	11th	
2010 Premier League speedway season	12th	
2011 National League speedway season	1st	PO semi final, NL pairs
2012 National League speedway season	4th	
2013 National League speedway season	8th	
2014 National League speedway season	6th	NL pairs
2015 National League speedway season	9th	
2016 National League speedway season	11th	
2017 National League speedway season	9th	
2018 National League speedway season	9th	
2019 National Development League speedway season	7th	

== Season summary (juniors) ==
Extended content

Year and league	Position	Notes
2004 Speedway Conference League	9th	Spitfires
2005 Speedway Conference League	7th	Spitfires
2006 Speedway Conference League	4th	Spitfires
2007 Speedway Conference League	8th	Spitfires

== Notable riders ==
- (England) Ken Adams
- (England) Steve Bastable
- (England) Mike Broadbank
- (England) Nigel Crabtree
- (England) Reg Fearman
- (England) John Fitzpatrick
- (England) Ian Gledhill
- (England) Ray Harris
- (England) Peter Jarman
- (England) Graham Jones
- (England) Alan Mogridge
- (England) Eric Monaghan
- (England) Paul Pickering
- (England) Colin Pratt
- (England) Paul Thorp
- (Denmark) Jan Staechmann
- (England) Fred Strecker

== Previous seasons (riders) ==
Extended content

2010 team

- (England) Jason Bunyan
- (Denmark) Klaus Jakobsen
- (Poland) Michał Rajkowski
- (Czech Republic) Hynek Štichauer
- (United States) Ricky Wells
- (Australia) James Holder
- (Australia) Taylor Poole
- (Czech Republic) Lubos Tomicek

2009 team

- (England) Lee Complin
- (England) Jason Bunyan
- (Denmark) Tom P. Madsen
- (Wales) Phil Morris
- (Denmark) Klaus Jakobsen
- (Denmark) Jesper Kristiansen

2008 team

- (England) Lee Complin
- (England) Ben Barker
- (England) Mark Burrows
- (England) Andrew Moore
- (Denmark) Krister Jacobsen
- (Denmark) Klaus Jakobsen
- (Denmark) Jesper Kristiansen

Also Rode:

- (England) Barrie Evans
- (Argentina) Emiliano Sanchez

2007 team

- (Denmark) Claus Vissing
- (England) Lee Complin
- (England) Glenn Cunningham
- (Australia) Rusty Harrison
- (England) Barrie Evans
- (England) Jamie Smith
- (England) Ben Barker

Also Rode

- (Germany) Robbie Kessler
- (England) Paul Pickering
- (England) Jack Hargreaves
- (England) Garry Stead (Garry suffered horrific injuries in a crash at Somerset.)

2006 team

- (England) Paul Clews
- (England) Michael Coles
- (Germany) Robbie Kessler
- (Australia) Mark Lemon
- (Australia) Trent Leverington
- (England) Alan Mogridge
- (England) Barrie Evans
- (England) Luke Priest
- (England) Paul Thorp
