= Tom P. Madsen =

Danish speedway rider

- Born: 24 November 1977 (age 48); Esbjerg, Denmark
- Nationality: Danish

Career history

Denmark
- 1998–2002: Holsted
- 2003, 2007: Brovst

Great Britain
- 1999, 2004–2005: Berwick Bandits
- 1999–2004: King's Lynn Stars
- 1999, 2003: Ipswich Witches
- 2003: Peterborough Panthers
- 2004–2005, 2007: Oxford Cheetahs
- 2006: Belle Vue Aces
- 2007: Mildenhall Fen Tigers
- 2007: Wolverhampton Wolves
- 2008: Reading Racers
- 2009: Stoke Potters
- 2009: Lakeside Hammers

Tom Paarup Madsen known as Tom P. Madsen (born 24 November 1977) is a former motorcycle speedway rider from Denmark. He earned one cap for the Denmark national speedway team.

== Speedway career ==
Madsen rode in the top tier of British Speedway riding for Belle Vue Aces during the 2006 Elite League speedway season. He began his British career riding for Berwick Bandits in 1999.
