= Adam Pietraszko =

Polish speedway rider

- Born: 18 August 1982 (age 44); Częstochowa, Poland
- Nationality: Polish

Career history

Poland
- 2001- 2003: Częstochowa
- 2004, 2006: Opole
- 2005: Lublin

Great Britain
- 2004, 2005: Berwick
- 2004: Peterborough
- 2006: Oxford

Adam Pietraszko (born 18 August 1982) is a former motorcycle speedway rider from Poland.

== Speedway career ==
Pietraszko rode in the top tier of British Speedway riding for the Oxford Cheetahs during the 2006 Elite League speedway season. He began his British career riding for Berwick Bandits in 2004.

In the Team Speedway Polish Championship, Pietraszko rode for Włókniarz Częstochowa, Kolejarz Opole and Motor Lublin.
