= Trelawny Tigers =

Speedway team in Cornwall

Club information
- Track address: Clay Country Moto Parc; Longstone Pit; Old Pound; Nanpean; St Austell; Cornwall, England
- Country: England
- Founded: 2001
- Closed: 2003
- Team manager: Mark Phillips
- Team captain: Chris Harris

Club facts
- Colours: Yellow and Black
- Track size: 230 metres (250 yd)
- Track record time: 53.10 seconds
- Track record date: 20 August 2002
- Track record holder: Emiliano Sanchez

Major team honours
Premier Trophy	2002

Trelawny Tigers operated as a British Premier League speedway team from 2001 to 2003 at the Clay Country Moto Parc in St Austell, Cornwall, England.

== History ==
At the end of the 2000 speedway season a team called St Austell Gulls handed their lease at the Clay Country Moto Parc to new promoters. However, the new promotion encountered problems in early 2001 when the team who would be known as the Trelawny Tigers were initially stopped from operating due to the 2001 United Kingdom foot-and-mouth outbreak.

Trelawny Tigers joined the Premier League (division 2) and rider Chris Harris was brought in to lead the team. The Tigers finished 14th in their inaugural 2001 Premier League speedway season.

The team enjoyed limited success on track, the highlight being winning the 2002 Premier Trophy competition after defeating Sheffield Tigers over two legs. The club were responsible for bringing Slovenian Matej Žagar into British League Scene in 2003 and he firmly established himself as one of the Premier League's top riders. The track record holder was Argentinian Emiliano Sanchez.

In 2003, the club also ran a junior team known as the Trelawny Pitbulls who competed in the Conference Trophy competition. After the 2003 season (in which the Tigers finished 8th) the team was disbanded.

== Track ==
The track, 230m in length, was unique in its setting being situated in a disused china clay pit near St Austell, Cornwall. The compact track was renowned throughout the league for the quality of its preparation and the racing it produced.

== Season summary ==
Extended content

Year and league	Position	Notes
2001 Premier League speedway season	14th	
2002 Premier League speedway season	14th	
2003 Premier League speedway season	8th	
