= Richard Juul =

Danish speedway rider

- Born: 30 October 1970 (age 56); Copenhagen, Denmark
- Nationality: Danish

Career history

Denmark
- 1990: Randers

Great Britain
- 1991–1994, 1997, 2001–2005, 2008: Newcastle Diamonds
- 1995, 1998–1999: Wolverhampton Wolves
- 1997: Berwick Bandits
- 2000: Isle of Wight
- 2000: Glasgow Tigers
- 2006: Redcar Bears

Team honours
- 2001: Premier League

Richard Christian Juul Sorensen (born 30 October 1970) is a former motorcycle speedway rider from Denmark. He earned one cap for the Denmark national speedway team.

== Career ==
Juul started racing in the British leagues during the 1991 British League Division Two season, when riding for the Newcastle Diamonds.

Juul rode in the top tier of British speedway for Wolverhampton Wolves during the 1995 Premier League speedway season. He was part of the team that won the league title during the 2001 Premier League speedway season.
