= Steve Masters (speedway rider) =

English speedway rider

- Born: 6 December 1970 (age 55); Eastbourne, England
- Nationality: British (English)

Career history

Great Britain
- 1989–1991: Eastbourne Eagles
- 1992–1993, 1996–1999, 2004: Swindon Robins
- 1994–1995: Poole Pirates
- 1998: Isle of Wight Islanders
- 2000: King's Lynn Stars
- 2001: Newport Wasps
- 2002–2003: Trelawny Tigers
- 2004: Rye House Rockets
- 2005: Reading Racers
- 2005: Belle Vue Aces

Sweden
- 2002–2003: Bysarna

Team honours
- 1994: British league winner
- 2000, 2005: Knockout Cup

Stevan Christopher E. Masters (born 6 December 1970) is a former motorcycle speedway rider from England.

== Career ==
Masters started racing in the British leagues in during the 1989 National League season, when riding for the Eastbourne Eagles. He spent three seasons with Eastbourne but only made a handful of appearances and failed to make any impression. He joined Swindon in 1991 and became a regular with the team in 1992.

Masters experienced his first taste of success as a Poole rider during the 1994 British League season, where he helped the south coast team win the league title. He re-joined Swindon and doubled up for the Isle of Wight Islanders in 1998, where he arguably had his best personal season averaging 8.21. and represented them in the Premier League Riders Championship, held on 12 September at Owlerton Stadium.

From 2000 to 2005, Masters represented various clubs including King's Lynn Stars (where he won a Knockout Cup), Newport Wasps, Trelawny Tigers, Rye House Rockets, Reading Racers and Belle Vue Aces. In 2005, he won a second Knockout Cup with Belle Vue, during his final season of racing.
