= Paul Clews =

- Born: 19 July 1979 (age 47); Coventry, England
- Nickname: Clewsy
- Nationality: British (English)

Career history
- 1995-1997: Coventry Bees
- 1996: Oxford Cheetahs
- 1996, 1998: Peterborough Panthers
- 1997: Isle of Wight Islanders
- 1998-2003: Reading Racers
- 2004-2006: Stoke Potters
- 2007: Newcastle Diamonds
- 2008: Newport Wasps
- 2008-2011: Berwick Bandits

Team honours
- 1998: Premier League Champion
- 1998: Premier League KO Cup Winner
- 1997: Premier Conference Champion

Paul Gordon Clews (born 19 July 1979 in Coventry, England) is a former motorcycle speedway rider from England.

== Career ==
Clews has ridden for Great Britain at Under-21 level. He won the Premier League and KO Cup with the Reading Racers in 1998.

Claws started the 2008 season with the Newport Wasps in the Premier League. However, after the death of Newport promoter Tim Stone, the club closed down which Clews became a free agent and so signed for the Berwick Bandits. He was the Berwick captain for the 2009 season. He retired from Speedway in 2011 after a final season with Berwick for the 2010 Premier League speedway season.
