= James Birkinshaw =

British speedway rider

- Born: 6 March 1980 (age 46); Sheffield, England
- Nationality: British (English)

Career history
- 1996-1997, 1999-2004, 2006-2007: Sheffield Tigers
- 1997-1998, 2001, 2005: Newcastle Diamonds
- 1999: Workington Comets
- 1999: Stoke Potters
- 2002, 2005: Glasgow Tigers
- 2008: Birmingham Brummies

Individual honours
- 2003: Conference League Riders' Champion

James Alexander Birkinshaw (born 6 March 1980 in Sheffield) is a former professional motorcycle speedway rider from England.

== Career ==
During the 2002 Speedway Conference League season, Birkinshaw won the Conference League Riders' Championship.

Birkinshaw spent the majority of his career at Sheffield Tigers, riding for them in three spells from 1996 to 1997, 1999 to 2004 and 2006 to 2007.

In 2008 (his last full season in speedway), Birkinshaw rode for Birmingham Brummies.
