= Emiliano Sanchez =

Argentine speedway rider (born 1977)

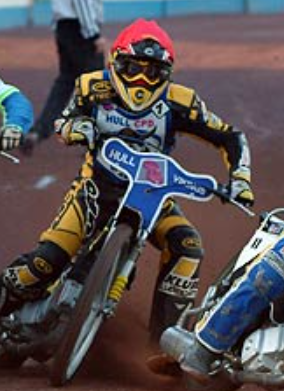
- Sanchez riding for Hull Vikings in 2005
- Born: 9 December 1977 (age 48); Buenos Aires, Argentina
- Nickname: Poty
- Nationality: Argentine, Italian

Career history
- 1999-2001: Glasgow Tigers
- 2002-2003: Trelawny Tigers
- 2004-2005: Hull Vikings
- 2006, 2011-2012: Sheffield Tigers
- 2007: Birmingham Brummies
- 2008: Stoke Potters
- 2008: Scunthorpe Scorpions
- 2009: Kings Lynn Stars
- 2010: Redcar Bears

Individual honours
- 2000, 2002, 2012: Argentinian Champion
- 2004, 2005: Italian National Champion

Team honours
- 2002, 2004, 2009: Premier Trophy Winner
- 2004: British Premier League Fours Winner
- 2004, 2009: Premier League winner
- 2004: Premier KO Cup Winner

Emiliano Diebo Sanchez also known as Poty Sanchez (born 9 December 1977 in Buenos Aires) is an Argentine former motorcycle speedway rider, with Italian ancestry. He is three times National Argentinian champion and twice National Italian champion. He has raced internationally for Italy.

== Club career ==
Sanchez became the first Argentine to race in Britain and started his British racing career with Glasgow Tigers in 1999. He quickly impressed and spent a further two seasons with the Scottish club before moving to England where he rode for Cornish side, Trelawny Tigers. He was part of their side that won the Premier Trophy in 2002. After moving to Hull Vikings he was part of the side that won the league and cup double in his first season in 2004.

When Hull folded after the 2005 season, Sanchez's contract was bought by Sheffield Tigers and he rode for the Yorkshire outfit in 2006. In 2007, he joined the newly reformed Birmingham Brummies, who ride at the Perry Barr Greyhound racing track, on loan from Sheffield Tigers. However, he had to have his spleen removed after rupturing it in a track crash. It ended his season and for a time there was uncertainty over his ability to start the 2008 season. In the end, he made a full recovery and signed for Stoke Potters.

Sanchez's confidence around their home track at the Loomer Road Stadium suffered and in early June he moved to Scunthorpe Scorpions. In 2009, Sanchez was signed by the Kings Lynn Stars after the Stars learned that John Oliver would not be returning to the UK from Australia for the 2009 season. Sanchez proved an inspired signing, helping the Stars secure the Premier League Championship and Premier Trophy.

== Individual career ==
Sanchez was the Argentine National Championship in 2000, 2002 and 2012. He also won the Italian National title in 2004 & 2005.

== International career ==
Sanchez has represented Italy at the Speedway World Cup three times. In the 2003 Speedway World Cup Italy, he finished fourth out of five teams in the first qualifying round in Daugavpils, Latvia. Sanchez scored twelve points. In the 2004, he led the Italians with 12 points in the first qualifying round held at Lonigo in Italy, as they finished in first place and qualified for the semi-finals. Italy finished last in the second semi-final held at Eastbourne, England, with Sanchez again topping the Italians scoring with six points.

Sanchez rode again for Italy in the 2005 Speedway World Cup when they finished last in the second qualifying round held at Terenzano in Italy. Sanchez again led the Italians with six points. He also rode for Italy in the 2005 European Pairs Speedway Championship final held in Gdańsk with the Italians finishing sixth out of seven teams and Sanchez scored six points.

== Honours ==
Club

- Trelawny Tigers
  - Premier Trophy winner: (1) 2002
- Hull Vikings
  - Premier League champion: (1) 2004
  - Premier Trophy winner: (1) 2004
  - Premier League Fours winner: (1) 2004
  - Young Shield winner: (1) 2004
  - Rider of the Year: (1) 2004
