= Andrew Moore (speedway rider) =

British speedway rider

- Born: 6 October 1982 (age 44); Lincoln, Lincolnshire
- Nationality: British (English)

Career history
- 1999-2005: Sheffield Tigers
- 1999: Arena Essex Hammers
- 2000: Berwick Bandits
- 2003: Poole Pirates
- 2004, 2007: Swindon Robins
- 2004-2006: Eastbourne Eagles
- 2006: Mildenhall Fen Tigers
- 2008: Scunthorpe Scorpions
- 2008: Stoke Potters

Andrew David Moore (born 6 October 1982) is a former speedway rider from England.

== Speedway career ==
Moore rode in the top tier of British Speedway riding for the Swindon Robins during the 2007 Elite League speedway season. He began his British career riding for Sheffield Tigers in 1999 and reached the final of two consecutive British Speedway Championships in 2004 and 2005. He rode from Eastbourne Eagles from 2004 to 2006.
