= Claus Kristensen =

Danish motorcycle speedway rider

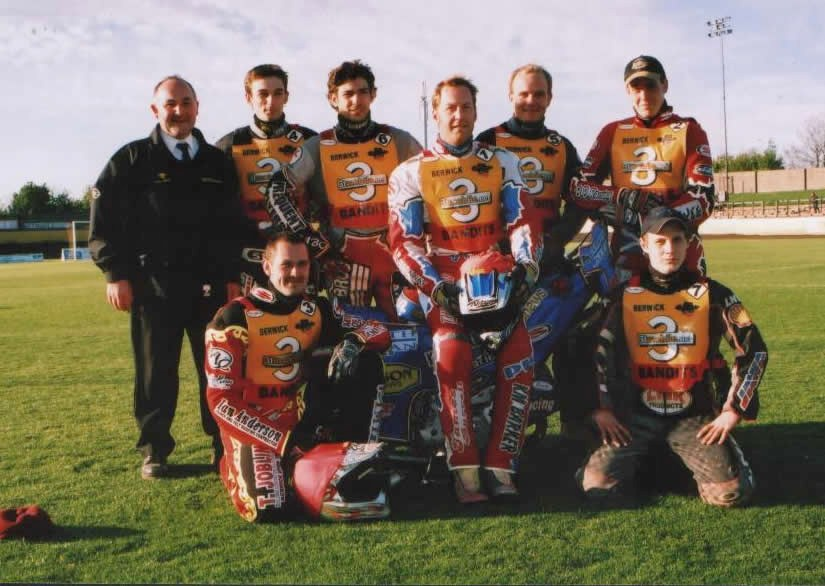
- Berwick 2003 (Kristensen back row, 2nd from right)
- Born: 11 June 1977 (age 49); Holstebro, Denmark
- Nationality: Danish

Career history

Denmark
- 1998–2001: Herning
- 2002: Kronjylland
- 2003: Slangerup

Sweden
- 1998, 2001: Team Svelux

Great Britain
- 1999, 2002–2004: Berwick Bandits
- 2000–2001, 2004: Swindon Robins
- 2005: Glasgow Tigers
- 2005: Newcastle Diamonds

Individual honours
- 1997: Danish U21 champion

Team honours
- 2000: Knockout Cup (tier 2)
- 2002: Fours

Claus Kristensen (born 11 June 1977) is a former motorcycle speedway rider from Denmark.

== Biography ==
Kristensen, born in Holstebro, came to prominence in 1997, after he won the Danish U21 championship. Initially, he rode for Herning in Denmark before securing a deal to ride in the British league system.

Kristensen began his British leagues career riding for Berwick Bandits during the 1999 Premier League speedway season.

The following season in 2000, Kristensen joined Swindon Robins, improved his average to 7.13 and would help the club win the Knockout Cup.

On his return to Berwick for the 2002 Premier League speedway season, Kristensen was part of the four that won the Premier League Four-Team Championship, which was held on 21 July 2002, at the Brandon Stadium.

Kristensen reached the final of the Danish Individual Speedway Championship, three times in 1998, 2002 and 2003.

Kristensen's final season in Britain was in 2005, when he rode for both Glasgow Tigers and Newcastle Diamonds.
