= Premier League (speedway) =

UK sports league

- Formerly: British League
- Sport: Speedway
- Founded: 1995
- Folded: 2016
- Replaced by: SGB Championship
- No. of teams: 13
- Country: United Kingdom
- Last champion: Somerset Rebels (2)
- Most titles: Edinburgh Monarchs (5)
- Website: www.speedwaygb.co

The Premier League was the second tier of speedway in the United Kingdom (with the exception of the 1995 and 1996 seasons) and governed by The Speedway Control Bureau (SCB), in conjunction with the British Speedway Promoters' Association (BSPA). The Premier League was founded in 1995 when the two divisions of the British League were amalgamated. In 1997, the Elite League was created as a new top tier with the Premier League becoming the second tier. The league operated until 2016 when British speedway was restructured with the formation of the SGB Premiership and SGB Championship.

As of 2016, there were 13 teams competing in this tier of British Speedway, contesting 6 competitions for silverware. These competitions were the Premier League, Premier League Cup, Premier League Knockout Cup, Premier League Pairs, Premier League Fours and the Premier League Riders' Championship.

== History ==
The Premier League was founded in 1995 by the amalgamation of the two divisions of the British League, becoming the single professional tier of speedway in the UK. In 1997, the Elite League was formed as a new top tier, with the Premier League becoming the second tier. In 2015, Edinburgh Monarchs became the first team to win back-to-back titles since it became the second tier in the sport. The league took a standard League format from its creation in 1995 until 2005. In 2006 & 2007, the play-offs were devised which the top 4 (8 in 2006) finishing teams in the League contested in a knock-out competition, with the winner of the play-offs crowned the Premier League Champions. From 2008 onwards, the play-offs remained, however the prize was changed. Instead, the team that finished top in the league would be crowned champions, and then the top 4 finishing teams would qualify for the play-offs. The winner of the competition would then go on to race against the bottom Elite League team in the promotion/relegation Battle. Since its inception, no Premier League team has been successful in gaining Promotion this way. There is no longer promotion to the Elite league.

The format was revised for the 2011 Season. All teams met each other once home and once away, with the League then splitting into two groups using a pre-set formula based on their relative standings at the cut-off point of 10 home/ten away matches to determine the remaining 12 (6 home/6 away) fixtures for each side. The League fixtures were expanded due to the Premier Trophy being defunct for the 2011 Season.

The Team that finished 1st in the League were crowned Premier League Champions, with the top 4 teams further competing in the Premier League play-offs.

In 2012 a pre-league League Cup tournament was contested, initially on a round robin basis by Northern and Southern mini-leagues, with the top two teams from each going on to contest semi-finals. The top six teams in the Premier League proper will contest the league title via play-offs, while the next six teams at the end of the league matches will contest another trophy via a similar system. The champions are now the winners of the play-offs.

== Teams ==
=== Team building ===
At the start of each season, teams are built up to maximum points limit. The combined Calculated Match Average (CMA) of the seven riders declared in the team must not be higher than an agreed figure set at the British Speedway Promoters' Association (BSPA) Annual General Meeting. The Current Combined CMA limit stands at 42.50 and has been this figure since the 2009 season.

=== Final Premier League 2016 teams ===
Team	Years Active	Team	Years Active
Berwick Bandits	1997–	Redcar Bears	2006–
Edinburgh Monarchs	1997–	Rye House Rockets	2002–
Glasgow Tigers	1997–	Scunthorpe Scorpions	2008–
Ipswich Witches	2011–	Sheffield Tigers	1997–
Somerset Rebels	2002–	Newcastle Diamonds	1997–
Workington Comets	1999–	Plymouth Devils	2011–
Peterborough Panthers	2014–		

=== Former teams ===
Team	Years Active	Other Information
Leicester Lions	2011–2013	Moved up to Elite League.
Birmingham Brummies	2007–2010	Moved up to Elite League.
Kings Lynn Stars	2003–2010	Moved up to Elite League.
Stoke Potters	1997–2010	Moved down to National League.
Isle of Wight Islanders	1997–2008	Moved down to National League.
Mildenhall Fen Tigers	2006–2008	Moved down to National League.
Reading Racers	2008	Loss of Stadium.
Reading Racers	1997–2005	Moved up to Elite League.
Exeter Falcons	1997–2005	Closure.
Hull Vikings	2000–2005	Closure.
Hull Vikings	1997–1998	Moved up to Elite League.
Arena Essex Hammers	1997–2003	Moved up to Elite League.
Swindon Robins	1999–2003	Moved up to Elite League.
Trelawny Tigers	2001–2003	Closure.
Oxford Cheetahs	1997	Moved up to Elite League.
Long Eaton Invaders	1997	Closure.
Newport Wasps	1997–2007, 2009–2011	Closure

==== Champions ====
Season	Champions	Second
1995	Eastbourne Eagles	Bradford Dukes
1996	Wolverhampton Wolves	Peterborough Panthers
1997	Reading Racers	Long Eaton Invaders
1998	Peterborough Panthers	Reading Racers
1999	Sheffield Tigers	Newport Wasps
2000	Exeter Falcons	Swindon Robins
2001	Newcastle Diamonds	Hull Vikings
2002	Sheffield Tigers	Newcastle Diamonds
2003	Edinburgh Monarchs	Sheffield Tigers
2004	Hull Vikings	Workington Comets
2005	Rye House Rockets	Berwick Bandits
2006	Kings Lynn Stars	Sheffield Tigers
2007*	Rye House Rockets	Sheffield Tigers
2008	Edinburgh Monarchs	Somerset Rebels
2009	Kings Lynn Stars	Edinburgh Monarchs
2010	Edinburgh Monarchs	Newcastle Diamonds
2011	Glasgow Tigers	Sheffield Tigers
2012	Scunthorpe Scorpions	Somerset Rebels
2013	Somerset Rebels	Edinburgh Monarchs
2014	Edinburgh Monarchs	Somerset Rebels
2015	Edinburgh Monarchs	Glasgow Tigers
2016	Somerset Rebels	Glasgow Tigers

* Although the Sheffield Tigers did not finish 2nd in the League, The Premier League play-offs in 2006 and 2007 decided the champions and runners up. In 2007, Sheffield Tigers finished 4th but got to the Final, eventually losing to the Rye House Rockets.

=== Premier League play-offs ===
The play-offs were founded in 2006 and are run as a Knock Out Competition. The play-offs are usually the last competition of the run during the Premier League season and are contested in October.

==== Format ====
The first format was the top 8 teams from the Premier league going through to the play-offs. The Eventual winner of the play-offs were then declared Premier League Champions with the other finalists being declared Runner-Up. In 2007, the format was changed to the top 4 contesting the play-offs to decide the League Champions.

Once again in 2008, the format was changed. This time the league winners were crowned Champions of the Premier League. Therefore, the play-offs were now to decide which team from the Top 4 would go on to contest the Bottom Elite League team in the promotion/relegation Battle. No Premier League team has yet been successful in the promotion/relegation battle.

In 2011 the play-off's weren't run, although they returned a year later in 2012 with Scunthorpe Scorpions victorious over the Somerset Rebels.

==== Winners ====
Season	Winners	Runners-up	Promotion/relegation battle
2006	Kings Lynn Stars	Sheffield Tigers	n/a
2007	Rye House Rockets	Sheffield Tigers	n/a
2008	Edinburgh Monarchs	Kings Lynn Stars	Lost to Wolverhampton Wolves
2009	Edinburgh Monarchs	Kings Lynn Stars	Lost to Belle Vue Aces
2010	Newcastle Diamonds	Sheffield Tigers	Lost to Ipswich Witches
2012	Scunthorpe Scorpions	Somerset Rebels	n/a
2013	Somerset Rebels	Edinburgh Monarchs	n/a
2014	Edinburgh Monarchs	Somerset Rebels	n/a
2015	Edinburgh Monarchs	Glasgow Tigers	n/a
2016	Somerset Rebels	Sheffield Tigers	n/a

=== Premier League Knockout Cup ===
The Premier League KOC was founded in 1968 under the name British League Division Two KOC, however since the Premier League was formed as the 2nd tier of British Speedway in 1997, it has come to be known as the Premier League KOC. The Competition usually runs throughout the premier league season and the final usually takes place in October.

=== Premier Trophy ===
The Premier Trophy was first contested in 1999. The Competition is usually run before the Premier League starts in April and May. The finals are usually contested in June/July. The competition was dropped from the 2011 calendar due to the expansion of the Premier League fixtures.

=== Premier League pairs ===
The Premier League Pairs was first contested in 1975. It was first run as the Premier League pairs when the 2nd tier was renamed the Premier League. The competition is usually run the night before the British GP. The current location for the contest is at the Oak Tree Arena, the home of the Somerset Rebels.

== See also ==
- List of United Kingdom Speedway League Champions
