= Paul Pickering (speedway rider) =

English speedway rider

- Born: 15 February 1966 (age 60); Hartlepool, England
- Nationality: British (English)

Career history
- 1992–1993: Middlesbrough Bears
- 1993–1996: Bradford Dukes
- 1997: Reading Racers
- 1998–2007: Stoke Potters
- 2004: Ipswich Witches

Team honours
- 1995: Knockout Cup
- 1997: Premier league

Paul Pickering (born 14 September 1968) is a former motorcycle speedway rider from England.

== Career ==
Pickering started racing in the British leagues during the 1992 British League Division Two season, when riding for the Middlesbrough Bears. He improved his average the following season to 6.46 (an improvement of nearly 4 points).

In 1993, Pickering had also started to make appearances in the top division for Bradford Dukes and in 1994 joined them permanently. During the 1995 Premier League speedway season, he was instrumental in helping the team win the Knockout Cup.

Pickering won more honours in 1997 as part of the Reading Racers league winning team, before joining Stoke Potters in 1998, where he was the team's leading scorer with an average of 9.00. He enjoyed some of his best years at Stoke, consistently averaging around the 8 to 9 point mark. He was voted the team's rider of the decade.
