= Michael Coles (speedway rider) =

British speedway rider

- Born: 11 August 1965 (age 61); Exeter, England
- Nationality: British (English)

Career history
- 1982-1987, 1996-2004: Exeter Falcons
- 1984: Weymouth Wildcats
- 1988: Mildenhall Fen Tigers
- 1989-1993: Edinburgh Monarchs
- 1994: Belle Vue Aces
- 1995: Oxford Cheetahs
- 1997: King's Lynn Stars
- 2005: Newport Wasps
- 2006: Stoke Potters
- 2006: Plymouth Devils
- 2007: Berwick Bandits
- 2007: Glasgow Tigers

Individual honours
- 1993: Scottish Open Champion

Team honours
- 2000: Premier League Champion
- 2004: Premier Trophy Winner
- 1993: British League Div 2 Fours Winner
- 1997: Young Shield

Michael Timothy Coles (born 11 August 1965 in Exeter, England), is a former international motorcycle speedway rider from England.

== Career ==
Coles first rode in the British speedway leagues for his home town club Exeter Falcons during the 1982 National League season. However he only made a handful appearances in his first three seasons with the club before making his breakthrough in 1985, improving his average to 6.28 and becoming a regular starter for Exeter. He spent six seasons at Exeter before joining Mildenhall Fen Tigers for the 1988 National League season and then Edinburgh Monarchs the following season.

At Edinburgh, Coles established himself as a heat leader and during his fifth and final season with the Scottish club in 1993, he averaged 8.57 and helped the team win the Fours Championship during the 1993 British League Division Two season. In 1994, he moved to the highest division after signing for the Belle Vue Aces and the following season rode for Oxford Cheetahs.

In 1996, Coles returned to his first club Exeter and won the Young Shield in 1997. Arguably his finest season was 2000, when he won the league title with Exeter and topped the team's averages at 9.26. After the 2004 season with Exeter (his 15th with the club) he rode for several teams before ending his career with the Glasgow Tigers in the 2007 Premier League.

Coles represented the England national speedway team at test level and at retirement he had earned two international caps.

== Personal life ==
Coles is the father of professional rider Connor Coles and the son of former rider Bob Coles.
