= Ray Morton =

English speedway rider

- Born: 19 June 1968 (age 58); London, England
- Nationality: British (English)

Career history
- 1985–1988: King's Lynn Stars
- 1988–1990: Wimbledon Dons
- 1991–1992, 1994–1996: Reading Racers
- 1993, 2001, 2005: Poole Pirates
- 1996, 1999: Hull Vikings
- 1998, 2000–2004, 2006: Isle of Wight Islanders
- 2005: Exeter Falcons
- 2007: Rye House Rockets

Individual honours
- 1995, 1996, 1998, 1999, 2001: British Championship finalist

Team honours
- 1992: British League winner
- 2003: Knockout Cup
- 1998, 2001: Young Shield winner

Raymond Paul Morton (born 19 June 1968) is a former international motorcycle speedway rider from England. He earned one international cap for the England national speedway team.

== Speedway career ==
Morton reached the final of the British Speedway Championship on five occasions in 1995, 1996, 1998, 1999 and 2001. He rode in the top tier of British Speedway from 1985 to 2007, riding for various clubs.

Morton started his British leagues career with King's Lynn Stars, during the 1985 British League season but came to prominence with Wimbledon Dons in the National League, averaging 8.30 for two consecutive seasons with them.

In 1991, Morton joined Reading Racers and won the British League with the club during the 1992 British League season. After several seasons with Reading, intertwined with seasons with Poole Pirates and Hull Vikings he joined the Isle of Wight Islanders, where he enjoyed seven seasons of racing. While with the Islanders, he won the Young Shield in 1998 and 2001 and the Knockout Cup in 2003.
