= Paul Bentley (speedway rider) =

British speedway rider (born 1968)

- Born: 18 January 1968 (age 58); Newcastle upon Tyne, England
- Nationality: British (English)

Career history
- 1987, 1997: Newcastle Diamonds
- 1988–1991, 1994: Middlesbrough Bears
- 1992, 1995–1996: Coventry Bees
- 1993: Bradford Dukes
- 1998, 2001: Hull Vikings
- 1999, 2004–2005: Glasgow Tigers
- 2000, 2002–2003: Berwick Bandits

Individual honours
- 1994: Second Division Riders' Champion

Team honours
- 2002: Premier League Four-Team Championship

Paul Bentley (born 18 January 1968) is a former speedway rider from England.

== Speedway career ==
Bentley rode in the top two tiers of British Speedway from 1987 to 2005, riding for various clubs.

In 1994, Bentley won the British League Division Two Riders Championship, held on 17 September at Brandon Stadium. In 1999, he rode his first spell at Glasgow Tigers and suffered a broken ankle and internal injuries in crash during May 1999.

Bentley stayed in Scotland riding for Berwick Bandits in 2000 before returning for second spell at Hull Vikings. In 2002, after riding for Berwick again he was part of the Berwick four that won the Premier League Four-Team Championship, which was held on 21 July 2002, at Brandon Stadium.

Bentley finished his career with Glasgow from 2004 to 2005.
