= 2000 Premier League speedway season =

British motorcycle speedway season

- League: Premier League
- Champions: Exeter Falcons
- Knockout Cup: Swindon Robins
- Young Shield: Swindon Robins
- Premier Trophy: Hull Vikings
- Individual: Carl Stonehewer
- Pairs: Workington Comets
- Fours: Sheffield Tigers
- Highest average: Peter Carr
- Division/s above: 2000 Elite League
- Division/s below: 2000 Conference League

The 2000 Premier League speedway season was the second division of speedway in the United Kingdom and governed by the Speedway Control Board (SCB), in conjunction with the British Speedway Promoters' Association (BSPA).

== Season summary ==
The League consisted of 14 teams for the 2000 season with the addition of the Hull Vikings who dropped down from the Elite League.

The League was run on a standard format with no play-offs and was won by Exeter Falcons.

== League ==
=== Final table ===
Pos		M	W	D	L	F	A	Pts	Bon	Tot
1	Exeter Falcons	26	15	1	10	1335	1003	31	13	44
2	Swindon Robins	26	18	0	8	1249	1094	36	8	44
3	Hull Vikings	26	16	2	8	1201	1142	33	9	42
4	Sheffield Tigers	26	16	4	9	1226	1102	32	10	42
5	Workington Comets	26	15	2	9	1261	1114	32	10	42
6	Edinburgh Monarchs	26	15	1	10	1213	1140	31	8	39
7	Stoke Potters	26	12	2	12	1166	1178	26	5	31
8	Newcastle Diamonds	26	11	1	14	1178	1157	23	7	30
9	Glasgow Tigers	26	10	2	14	1096	1232	22	5	27
10	Newport Wasps	26	10	1	15	1089	1245	21	5	26
11	Isle of Wight Islanders	26	8	2	16	1128	1208	18	6	24
12	Berwick Bandits	26	10	0	16	1133	1210	20	3	23
13	Arena Essex Hammers	26	11	0	15	1054	1272	22	1	23
14	Reading Racers	26	7	1	18	1075	1262	15	2	17

=== Fixtures and results ===
Home \ Away	AE	BER	ED	EX	GLA	HV	IOW	ND	NW	RR	SHE	STO	SWI	WOR
Arena Essex Hammers		49–41	43–47	51–38	51–39	48–42	46–43	44–46	53–24	49–41	61–29	48–42	50–41	45–44
Berwick Bandits	53–37		52–37	44–46	46–44	48–42	47–43	49–41	56–34	49–41	51–39	44–46	42–48	49–41
Edinburgh Monarchs	60–30	52–37		57–32	57–34	46–44	54–36	48–44	55–35	53–40	53–39	52–38	46–43	48–39
Exeter Falcons	70–21	52–38	59–31		74–16	62–28	62–28	51–39	72–18	67–22	60–30	53–37	57–33	60–31
Glasgow Tigers	59–31	46–44	47–46	45–45		39–51	50–40	54–39	44–46	49–41	33–33+	51–39	44–46	47–43
Hull Vikings	55–34	51–41	43–47	46–44	48–42		54–37	45–42	50–40	48–41	45–44	48–42	51–39	45–44
Isle of Wight Islanders	50–39	53–37	45–45	50–40	54–36	44–46		46.5–43.5	54–36	51–39	42–48	48–42	44–46	44–46
Newcastle Diamonds	65–25	62–28	49–41	49–41	43–47	45–45	49–40		50–40	44–39	47–43	43–47	49–41	42–46
Newport Wasps	52–39	51–42	61–29	47–43	51–41	43–47	49–41	52–40		50–40	43–47	49–41	40–50	45–45
Reading Racers	57–33	50–40	49–44	46–44	43–47	39–53	48–41	43–47	46–44		45–45	47–43	32–58	39–50
Sheffield Tigers	62–29	59–31	54–39	59–31	60–30	50–43	57–33	48–44	54–36	51–39		48–44	56–34	48–42
Stoke Potters	56–34	49–41	47–46	43–47	49–43	45–45	45–45	54–36	45–44	49–41	50–40		48–42	52–37
Swindon Robins	57–33	46–44	54–36	48–42	66–24	50–42	50–40	49–41	60–30	62–28	49–41	52–38		46–44
Workington Comets	59–31	51–39	46–44	46–43	45–45	46–44	54–36	51–39	61–29	51–39	48–41	54–35	52–39	

Source: +Tie awarded to Sheffield
Legend: Blue = home team win; Yellow = draw; Red = away team win.

== Premier League Knockout Cup ==
The 2000 Premier League Knockout Cup was the 33rd edition of the Knockout Cup for tier two teams. Swindon Robins were the winners of the competition.

First round

Date	Team one	Score	Team two
05/06	Reading	43-47	Swindon
08/06	Swindon	46-44	Reading
05/06	Exeter	50-40	Isle of Wight
06/06	Isle of Wight	42-47	Exeter
07/06	Hull	48-42	Sheffield
08/06	Sheffield	45-45	Hull
10/06	Stoke	48-42	Newcastle
11/06	Newcastle	43-47	Stoke
10/06	Workington	40-31	Newport
11/06	Newport	48-42	Workington
10/06	Edinburgh	43-29	Arena Essex
09/06	Arena Essex	48-42	Edinburgh

Second round

Date	Team one	Score	Team two
13/07	Swindon	49-41	Berwick
15/07	Berwick	48-42	Swindon
10/07	Exeter	64-26	Glasgow
09/07	Glasgow	50-40	Exeter
12/07	Hull	42-48	Stoke
15/07	Stoke	41-48	Hull
15/07	Workington	50-40	Edinburgh
14/07	Edinburgh	44-46	Workington

Semi-finals

Date	Team one	Score	Team two
01/10	Swindon	48-23	Exeter
07/08	Exeter	46-44	Swindon
25/08	Hull	49-41	Workington
05/08	Workington	48-42	Hull

=== Final ===
First leg

12 October 2000

Swindon Robins Alan Mogridge (guest) 14 Paul Fry 12 Claus Kristensen 9 Oliver Allen 8 Martin Dixon 6 Neil Collins 5 Mark Steel 5	59 – 31	Hull Vikings Paul Thorp 9 Lee Dicken 8 Garry Stead 5 Rene Aas 4 Paul Smith 4 Jamie Smith 1 Mike Smith 0

Abbey Stadium

Second leg

18 October 2000

Hull Vikings Paul Thorp 14 Garry Stead 10 Mike Smith 9 Lee Dicken 7 Jamie Smith 4 Rene Aas 2 Paul Smith 2	48 – 42	Swindon Robins David Walsh (guest) 12 Oliver Allen 11 Martin Dixon 6 Paul Fry 5 Neil Collins 3 Mark Steel 3 Claus Kristensen 2

Craven Park, Hull

Swindon were declared Knockout Cup Champions, winning on aggregate 101–79.

== Young Shield ==
- End of season competition for the top eight league teams

First round

Team one	Team two	Score
Sheffield+	Hull	55–35, 35–55
Stoke	Exeter	48–41, 40–50
Swindon+	Edinburgh	49–41, 41–49
Newcastle	Workington	49–41, 40–50

+Swindon and Sheffield won ride off

Semi-final

Team one	Team two	Score
Sheffield	Swindon	47–43, 40–49
Workington	Exeter	46–44, 42–48

Final

Team one	Team two	Score
Swindon	Exeter	65–25, 47–42

== Premier Trophy ==
North Group

Pos	Team	P	W	D	L	Pts
1	Workington	12	9	0	3	18
2	Hull	12	9	0	3	19
3	Sheffield	12	7	0	5	14
4	Edinburgh	12	6	0	6	12
5	Berwick	12	5	0	7	10
6	Glasgow	12	4	0	8	8
7	Newcastle	12	2	0	10	4

South Group

Pos	Team	P	W	D	L	Pts
1	Swindon	12	7	2	3	16
2	Exeter	12	6	0	6	12
3	Stoke	12	6	0	6	12
4	Newport	12	6	0	6	12
5	Isle of Wight	12	5	1	6	11
6	Arena Essex	12	5	1	6	11
7	Reading	12	5	0	7	10

Home \ Away	BER	ED	GLA	HUL	NEW	SHE	WOR
Berwick		49–40	60–30	57–33	53–36	47–43	42–48
Edinburgh	50–40		48–41	47–43	51–38	47–43	43–50
Glasgow	47–43	45–44		42–48	48–42	47–43	43–47
Hull	46–44	46–44	51–39		48–42	52–38	47–45
Newcastle	56–34	44–45	49–41	41–52		42–48	42–48
Sheffield	50–43	58–32	53–37	47–42	57–33		38–34
Workington	51–38	51–39	55–38	45–47	56–34	51–39	

Legend: Blue = home team win; Yellow = draw; Red = away team win.

Home \ Away	AE	EX	IOW	NWP	REA	STO	SWI
Arena Essex		46–44	49–40	48–42	48–42	46–44	45–45
Exeter	75–15		54–36	53–37	66–24	57–33	64–26
Isle of Wight	52–38	48–42		43–47	44–46	47–43	53–37
Newport	51–39	50–40	45–45		47–42	48–44	45–45
Reading	57–33	52–38	43–47	46–43		43–47	43–47
Stoke	57–33	52–38	54–36	47–42	42–48		43–47
Swindon	61–29	61–29	55–35	47–43	52–39	43–47	

Legend: Blue = home team win; Yellow = draw; Red = away team win.

Semi-final

Team one	Team two	Score
Hull	Swindon	47–43, 45–45
Workington	Exeter	54–36, 30–60

Final

Team one	Team two	Score
Exeter	Hull	44–46, 40–50

== Riders' Championship ==
Carl Stonehewer won the Riders' Championship. The final was held on 10 September at Owlerton Stadium.

Pos.	Rider	Pts	Total	SF	Final
1	(England) Carl Stonehewer	3 3 2 3 3	14	-	3
2	(England) Peter Carr	1 2 1 2 3	9	2	2
3	(England) Paul Pickering	3 3 2 3 3	14	-	1
4	(England) Sean Wilson	3 3 3 1 3	13	3	0
5	(England) Paul Thorp	0 3 2 3 1	9	1	
6	(England) Alan Mogridge	2 2 3 3 2	12	0	
7	(England) Andre Compton	2 1 3 0 2	8		
8	(Germany) Robbie Kessler	3 1 ex 2 2	8		
9	(England) Paul Fry	2 2 2 2 0	8		
10	(England) Les Collins	1 1 1 3 1	7		
11	(England) Michael Coles	1 2 1 0 1	5		
12	(Sweden) Anders Henriksson	ex 0 1 1 2	4		
13	(England) Colin White	2 0 0 1 1	4		
14	(Wales) Phil Morris	0 1 2 ex 0	3		
15	(Sweden) Robert Eriksson	1 ex ex	1		
16	(England) Ray Morton	0 ex	0		
17	(England) Adam Allott	0 1 0 0	1		

- ex=excluded

== Pairs ==
The Premier League Pairs Championship was held at Derwent Park on 8 July. The event was won by Workington Comets for the second successive season. The meeting was subject to heavy rain, which forced a shortened version of the event.

Group A
Pos	Team	Pts	Riders
1	Workington	14	Stonehewer 8, Powell 6
2	Isle of Wight	8	Morton 8, Bird 0
3	Swindon	8	Smart 6, Fry 2
4	Newcastle	8	Pedersen 6, Compton 2
5	Newport	7	Neath 5, Howe 2

Group B
Pos	Team	Pts	Riders
1	Edinburgh	12	Carr P 6, Eriksson 6
2	Sheffield	11	Wilson 7, Kessler 4
3	Hull	9	Stead 7, Thorp 2
4	Berwick	8	Bentley 6, Mogridge 2
5	Exeter	5	Coles 3, Simmons 2

Semi finals

- Workington 4: Sheffield 3
- Isle of Wight 4: Edinburgh 3

Final

- Workington 7: Isle of Wight 2

== Fours ==
Sheffield Tigers won the Premier League Four-Team Championship for the second successive season. The final was held on 6 August 2000, at the East of England Arena.

Group A
Pos	Team	Pts	Riders
1	Swindon	14	
2	Sheffield	13	
3	Newcastle	12	
4	Workington	9	

Group B
Pos	Team	Pts	Riders
1	Berwick	17	
2	Isle of Wight	14	
3	Edinburgh	10	
4	Exeter	7	

Final
Pos	Team	Pts	Riders
1	Sheffield	30	Wilson, Kessler, Lee. Stead
2	Isle of Wight	16	
3	Swindon	14	
4	Berwick	12	

== Leading averages ==
Rider	Team	Average
(England) Peter Carr	Edinburgh	10.28
(England) Sean Wilson	Sheffield	10.27
(England) Ray Morton	Isle of Wight	10.09
(England) Carl Stonehewer	Workington	9.89
(Denmark) Bjarne Pedersen	Newcastle	9.70
(Sweden) Robert Eriksson	Edinburgh	9.31
(England) Michael Coles	Exeter	9.26
(England) Alan Mogridge	Berwick	9.07
(England) Paul Fry	Swindon	8.89
(Italy) Armando Castagna	Reading	8.88

== Riders & final averages ==
Arena Essex

- Colin White 8.12
- Troy Pratt 7.72
- Jan Pedersen 6.55
- Savalas Clouting 6.44
- Gary Corbett 5.85
- Matt Read 5.60
- Brent Collyer 5.43
- Justin Elkins 5.10
- David Mason 3.93
- Luke Clifton 2.80
- Barrie Evans .2.65
- Jon Underwood 2.26

Berwick

- Alan Mogridge 9.07
- Paul Bentley 8.21
- Scott Lamb 7.45
- David Meldrum 7.17
- Jörg Pingel 7.03
- Scott Smith 6.91
- Dean Felton 4.16
- Freddie Stephenson 3.49
- Steven McAllister 2.00
- Wesley Waite 1.14

Edinburgh

- Peter Carr 10.28
- Robert Eriksson 9.31
- Kevin Little 6.46
- Ross Brady 5.48
- Blair Scott 5.20
- Christian Henry 4.30
- Will Beveridge 3.74
- Jonathan Swales 2.00

Exeter

- Michael Coles 9.26
- Mark Simmonds 7.79
- Seemond Stephens 7.77
- Chris Harris 7.05
- Roger Lobb 7.05
- Bobby Eldridge 6.76
- Graeme Gordon 6.20
- Wayne Barrett 3.00

Glasgow

- Les Collins 8.55
- James Grieves 7.97
- Mark Courtney 7.14
- Emiliano Sanchez 6.50
- Richard Juul 6.32
- Aidan Collins 4.58
- Rusty Harrison 4.39
- Sean Courtney 4.00
- Scott Courtney 2.97

Hull

- Paul Thorp 8.79
- Garry Stead 8.25
- Lee Dicken 7.15
- Paul Smith 6.89
- Rene Aas 6.10
- Mike Smith 5.51
- Jamie Smith 3.03
- Wesley Waite 1.38

Isle of Wight

- Ray Morton 10.09
- Danny Bird 6.96
- Scott Swain 6.93
- Adam Shields 6.78
- Richard Juul 5.59
- Glen Phillips 4.28
- Tommy Palmer 4.00
- Adrian Newman 3.09

Newcastle

- Bjarne Pedersen 9.70
- Jesper Olsen 8.20
- Stuart Swales 7.57
- Andre Compton 7.43
- Grant MacDonald 5.27
- Will Beveridge 5.00
- Paul Macklin 3.74
- Rob Grant Jr 3.63
- Krister Marsh 3.62
- Darren Pearson 3.51
- Jamie Smith 3.20

Newport

- Anders Henriksson 8.68
- Ben Howe 8.27
- Andrew Appleton 7.21
- Chris Neath 6.92
- Jon Armstrong 4.74
- Craig Taylor 4.68
- Nathan Murray 4.17
- Chris Courage 3.32
- Lee Herne 2.51

Reading

- Armando Castagna 8.88
- Phil Morris 8.44
- Per Wester 6.96
- Paul Clews 6.25
- Krister Marsh 5.61
- Shane Colvin 3.93
- Marc Norris 3.61
- Lee Herne 2.67

Sheffield

- Sean Wilson 10.27
- Robbie Kessler 8.72
- Simon Stead 8.31
- Paul Lee 5.74
- Adam Allott 4.85
- Simon Cartwright 4.64
- James Birkinshaw 3.65
- Andrew Moore 3.19

Stoke

- Paul Pickering 8.78
- David Walsh 7.75
- Mark Burrows 6.92
- Tony Atkin 6.20
- Wayne Broadhurst 4.53
- Paul Macklin 2.56
- Steven McAllister 2.29

Swindon

- Paul Fry 8.89
- Frank Smart 8.79
- Neil Collins 7.32
- Claus Kristensen 7.13
- Martin Dixon 6.70
- Oliver Allen 6.58
- Mark Steel 5.21
- Nathan Murray 4.32

Workington

- Carl Stonehewer 9.89
- Brent Werner 8.74
- Peter Ingvar Karlsson 8.69
- Mick Powell 8.62
- Lee Smethills 5.22
- Barry Campbell 4.80
- Adrian Newman 3.36
- Geoff Powell 3.19
- James Mann 2.34
- Jamie Swales 1.03

== See also ==
- List of United Kingdom Speedway League Champions
- Knockout Cup (speedway)
