= 1998 Elite League speedway season =

British motorcycle speedway season

- League: Sky Sports Elite League
- Champions: Ipswich Witches
- Knockout Cup: Ipswich Witches
- Craven Shield: Ipswich Witches
- Individual: Tony Rickardsson
- Highest average: Tony Rickardsson
- Division/s below: Premier League; Conference League

The 1998 Elite League speedway season was the 64th season of the top tier of speedway in the United Kingdom and the second year known as the Elite League, governed by the Speedway Control Board (SCB) in conjunction with the British Speedway Promoters' Association (BSPA).

== Summary ==
In 1998, the league decreased to nine teams with the closure of the Bradford Dukes at the end of their championship winning season in 1997. The Peterborough Panthers dropped down to the Premier League but were replaced by the Oxford Cheetahs. The league operated on a standard format without play-offs.

Ipswich Witches won the league (their first since 1984) and cup double and were led by the world's leading rider Tony Rickardsson. Rickardsson topped the averages for the second consecutive season and was well supported by Pole Tomasz Gollob in his maiden British season. English riders Chris Louis and Scott Nicholls added even more strength and became British Champion and British Under-21 Champion respectively during the season.

== Final table ==
Pos		M	W	D	L	F	A	Pts	Bon	Tot
1	Ipswich Witches	32	26	1	5	1653	1211	53	16	69
2	Belle Vue Aces	32	20	0	12	1524	1353	40	12	52
3	Coventry Bees	32	18	1	13	1474	1401	37	11	48
4	Swindon Robins	32	15	1	16	1429	1450	31	7	38
5	Eastbourne Eagles	32	15	0	17	1430	1449	30	7	37
6	Wolverhampton Wolves	32	14	1	17	1421	1444	29	8	37
7	Oxford Cheetahs	32	13	2	17	1388	1490	28	5	33
8	Poole Pirates	32	11	1	14	1348	1529	23	5	28
9	King's Lynn Knights	32	8	1	23	1270	1610	17	1	18

=== 'A' Fixtures ===
Home \ Away	BV	COV	EAS	IPS	KL	OX	PP	SWI	WOL
Belle Vue Aces		46–44	54–36	47.5–41.5	54–36	55–35	54–36	59–31	52–38
Coventry Bees	43–46		51–39	43–47	47–43	45–45	52–38	53–37	44–46
Eastbourne Eagles	49–41	49–41		42–48	48–42	60–30	52–38	52–38	57–33
Ipswich Witches	54–36	50–39	53–37		60–30	48–42	63–27	61–29	51–39
King's Lynn Knights	59–31	47–43	47–43	33–57		47–43	44–46	52–38	45–45
Oxford Cheetahs	46–44	37–53	39–51	47–43	52–38		38–51	46–44	50–40
Poole Pirates	47–43	48–42	41–49	26–64	57–33	48–41		38–52	43–47
Swindon Robins	47–4	42–47	49–41	31–59	55–35	51–39	53–37		52–38
Wolverhampton Wolves	31–59	39–50	54–36	38–40	50–40	55–35	50–40	55–35	

Legend: Blue = home team win; Yellow = draw; Red = away team win.

=== 'B' Fixtures ===
Home \ Away	BV	COV	EAS	IPS	KL	OX	PP	SWI	WOL
Belle Vue Aces		58–32	56–34	46–44	65–25	51–39	49–41	57–33	48–42
Coventry Bees	52–38		50–40	46–44	55–35	44–46	48–42	48–42	46–44
Eastbourne Eagles	59–31	44–46		38–51	56–34	47–43	52–38	55–35	55–35
Ipswich Witches	48–42	49–41	47–43		60–30	63–27	51–39	58–32	56–34
King's Lynn Knights	41–49	47–43	46–44	27–63		40–50	40–50	42–48	53–37
Oxford Cheetahs	47–43	42–48	56–34	44–46	57–33		47–43	45–45	44–46
Poole Pirates	40–50	49–41	56–34	45–45	46–44	40–50		42–48	46–43
Swindon Robins	55–35	42–48	64–26	44–46	56–34	38–52	59–31		56–34
Wolverhampton Wolves	48–42	40–49	62–28	47–43	62–28	56–34	51–39	42–48	

Legend: Blue = home team win; Yellow = draw; Red = away team win.

== Elite League Knockout Cup ==
The 1998 Speedway Star Knockout Cup was the 60th edition of the Knockout Cup for tier one teams and the second under its new name. Ipswich Witches were the winners of the competition.

First round

Group A

Date	Team one	Score	Team two
27/03	Belle Vue	50-40	Coventry
28/03	Coventry	51-39	Belle Vue
29/03	Swindon	41-49	Wolverhampton
30/03	Wolverhampton	47-42	Oxford
03/04	Oxford	45-45	Coventry
06/04	Wolverhampton	50-40	Swindon
10/04	Swindon	46-44	Oxford
11/04	Coventry	47-43	Swindon
12/04	Belle Vue	43-47	Wolverhampton
13/04	Wolverhampton	45-45	Belle Vue
17/04	Belle Vue	46-43	Oxford
18/04	Coventry	48-42	Oxford
20/04	Wolverhampton	45-45	Coventry
24/04	Belle Vue	41-48	Swindon
24/04	Oxford	39-51	Wolverhampton
25/04	Coventry	54-36	Wolverhampton
30/04	Swindon	40-50	Belle Vue
03/05	Oxford	48-42	Belle Vue
08/05	Oxford	58-32	Swindon
11/05	Swindon	41-49	Coventry

Pos	Team	P	W	D	L
1	Wolverhampton	8	5	2	1
2	Coventry	8	5	2	1
3	Belle Vue	8	3	1	4
4	Oxford	8	2	1	5
5	Swindon	8	2	0	6

Group B

Date	Team one	Score	Team two
19/03	Ipswich	60-30	Kings Lynn
22/03	Eastbourne	65-25	Kings Lynn
26/03	Ipswich	56-33	Poole
29/03	Eastbourne	52-38	Poole
01/04	Kings Lynn	41-31	Eastbourne
02/04	Ipswich	49-41	Eastbourne
11/04	Eastbourne	44-46	Ipswich
22/04	Kings Lynn	34-55	Ipswich
22/04	Poole	47-43	Eastbourne
24/04	Kings Lynn	47-43	Poole
26/04	Poole	48-42	Kings Lynn
06/05	Poole	39-51	Ipswich

Pos	Team	P	W	D	L
1	Ipswich	6	6	0	0
2	Eastbourne	6	2	0	4
3	King's Lynn	6	2	0	4
4	Poole	6	2	0	4

Semi-finals

Date	Team one	Score	Team two
22/08	Coventry	54-36	Wolverhampton
29/06	Wolverhampton	49-41	Coventry
16/07	Ipswich	57-33	Eastbourne
04/07	Eastbourne	42-48	Ipswich

Final

The first leg was due to be held on 9 October at Foxhall Stadium but was abandoned after 5 heats due to heavy rain. Coventry were leading 17-13 at the time.

First leg

10 October 1998

Coventry Bees Jason Crump (guest) 15 Greg Hancock 13 Brian Andersen 8 Shaun Tacey 6 Andreas Jonsson 1 Stuart Robson 0	43 - 47	Ipswich Witches Tony Rickardsson 15 Tomasz Gollob 11 Scott Nicholls 10 Chris Louis 6 Antonín Šváb Jr. 3 Savalas Clouting 2

Brandon Stadium

Second leg

15 October 1998

Ipswich Witches Tomasz Gollob 12 Tony Rickardsson 11 Chris Louis 10 Scott Nicholls 6 Antonín Šváb Jr. 5 Savalas Clouting 4	48 - 42	Coventry Bees Greg Hancock 18 Brian Andersen 12 Mark Loram (guest) 5 Shaun Tacey 3 Andreas Jonsson 2 Stuart Robson 2

Foxhall Stadium

Ipswich were declared Knockout Cup Champions, winning on aggregate 95-85.

== Craven Shield ==
- End of season competition for the top 6 league teams

First Round

Team one	Team two	Score
Wolverhampton	Coventry	40–50, 41–49
Swindon	Eastbourne	68–22, 41–49

Semi-final

Team one	Team two	Score
Belle Vue	Coventry	43–47, 38–52
Ipswich	Swindon	49–41, 50–40

Final

Team one	Team two	Score
Ipswich	Coventry	59–31, 37–53

== Riders' Championship ==
Tony Rickardsson won the Elite League Riders' Championship, held at the Abbey Stadium in Swindon on 11 October.

Pos.	Rider	Pts	Total	SF	Final
1	(Sweden) Tony Rickardsson	3 2 2 3 3	13	x	3
2	(Australia) Jason Crump	3 3 3 3 2	14	x	2
3	(England) Joe Screen	3 2 1 2 3	11	2	1
4	(Australia) Leigh Adams	2 1 3 3 2	11	3	0
5	(Sweden) Jimmy Nilsen	2 2 2 3 2	11	1	
6	(Australia) Todd Wiltshire	3 3 2 2 0	10	0	
7	(United States) Greg Hancock	2 3 0 2 3	10		
8	(Denmark) Brian Andersen	0 3 3 0 1	7		
9	(United States) Ronnie Correy	2 1 3 1 0	7		
10	(England) Chris Louis	1 1 0 1 3	6		
11	(England) Mark Loram	1 0 1 2 2	6		
12	(England) Martin Dugard	1 0 2 1 1	5		
13	(Australia) Craig Boyce	1 0 1 1 0	3		
14	(Australia) Ryan Sullivan	0 2 0 0 0	2		
15	(England) David Norris	0 1 0 0 1	2		
16	(Australia) Shane Parker	X 0 1 R 1	2		
*exc=excluded

== Leading final averages ==
Rider	Team	Average
(Sweden) Tony Rickardsson	Ipswich	10.35
(United States) Billy Hamill	Coventry	10.07
(United States) Greg Hancock	Coventry	9.58
(Australia) Jason Crump	Oxford	9.54
(Poland) Tomasz Gollob	Ipswich	9.38
(England) Chris Louis	Ipswich	9.35
(United States) Ronnie Correy	Belle Vue	9.02
(England) Joe Screen	Belle Vue	8.99
(England) Martin Dugard	Eastbourne	8.70
(Australia) Leigh Adams	Swindon	8.53
(Sweden) Mikael Karlsson	Wolverhampton	8.53

== Riders & final averages ==
Belle Vue

- (United States) Ronnie Correy 9.02
- (England) Joe Screen 8.99
- (Australia) Jason Lyons 7.50
- (Australia) Frank Smart 6.00
- (Czech Republic) Zdeněk Tesař 5.83
- (England) Andy Smith 5.57
- (Sweden) Niklas Klingberg 5.25
- (England) Sean Wilson 4.87
- (Sweden) Robert Eriksson 4.00
- (Slovenia) Matej Ferjan 2.24

Coventry

- (United States) Billy Hamill 10.07
- (United States) Greg Hancock 9.58
- (Denmark) Brian Andersen 7.67
- (Sweden) Andreas Jonsson 5.63
- (England) Shaun Tacey 4.44
- (England) Stuart Robson 3.42
- (England) David Walsh 3.19

Eastbourne

- (England) Martin Dugard 8.70
- (England) Glenn Cunningham 7.33
- (England) David Norris 7.15
- (Sweden) Stefan Dannö 6.86
- (England) Gary Havelock 6.59
- (Sweden) Stefan Andersson 6.32
- (Sweden) Peter Nahlin 6.00
- (England) Scott RobsonS 2.82
- (Sweden) Robert Johansson 2.36

Ipswich

- (Sweden) Tony Rickardsson 10.35
- (Poland) Tomasz Gollob 9.38
- (England) Chris Louis 9.35
- (England) Scott Nicholls 6.41
- (Czech Republic) Antonín Šváb Jr. 4.98
- (England) Savalas Clouting 4.19

King's Lynn

- (Australia) Shane Parker 6.81
- (Poland) Piotr Protasiewicz 6.64
- (Czech Republic) Bohumil Brhel 5.80
- (Czech Republic) Tomáš Topinka 5.59
- (England) Simon Wigg 5.53
- (England) Lee Richardson 5.09
- (England) Ben Howe 4.72
- (England) Scott Swain 2.78

Oxford

- (Australia) Jason Crump 9.54
- (Australia) Todd Wiltshire 6.80
- (Australia) Steve Johnston 6.31
- (England) Paul Hurry 6.18
- (Denmark) Jan Stæchmann 5.87
- (England) Steve Schofield 5.27
- (England) Lawrence Hare 3.48

Poole

- (England) Gary Havelock 8.17
- (Australia) Ryan Sullivan 7.59
- (Australia) Craig Boyce 7.12
- (Australia) Mark Lemon 6.40
- (England) Kelvin Tatum 5.56
- (Norway) Lars Gunnestad 5.46
- (England) Marvyn Cox 5.25
- (Sweden) Magnus Zetterström 4.61

Swindon

- (Australia) Leigh Adams 8.53
- (Sweden) Jimmy Nilsen 8.32
- (England) Andy Smith 7.55
- (Denmark) John Jørgensen 6.93
- (Denmark) Brian Karger 6.27
- (Denmark) Charlie Gjedde 4.78
- (England) Steve Masters 3.37

Wolverhampton

- (Sweden) Mikael Karlsson 8.53
- (England) Mark Loram 8.02
- (United States) Sam Ermolenko 7.42
- (Czech Republic) George Štancl 6.23
- (Denmark) Jesper B. Jensen 4.73
- (England) Garry Stead 3.77
- (Scotland) James Grieves 3.65

== See also ==
- List of United Kingdom Speedway League Champions
- Knockout Cup (speedway)
