= 1994 British Speedway Championship =

British Championship motorcycle speedway season

Seasons
- ← 1993 1995 →

The 1994 British Speedway Championship was the 34th edition of the British Speedway Championship. The final took place on 1 May at Brandon Stadium in Coventry, England. Andy Smith won the championship, the second time in succession that he had won the title. Joe Screen won a run-off against Steve Schofield and Gary Havelock to finish second.

== Qualification ==
Date	Venue	Winner	2nd	3rd
28 March	County Ground Stadium, Exeter	Scott Smith	Paul Fry	Ben Howe
2 April	Abbey Stadium, Swindon	David Blackbird	Paul Hurry	Alun Rossiter

== Semi-Finals ==
- 18 April
- (England) Smallmead Stadium, Reading
- Top 8 to British final

Pos.	Rider	Points
1	Dave Mullett	15
2	Chris Louis	11
3	Jeremy Doncaster	11
4	Kelvin Tatum	11
5	Martin Dugard	10
6	Dean Barker	10
7	Ben Howe	9
8	Paul Hurry	9
9	David Norris	7
10	Nigel Crabtree	7
11	Paul Thorp	6
12	Alun Rossiter	5
13	Ray Morton	4
14	Troy Pratt	2
15	Phil Morris	2
16	Garry Stead (res)	1
17	Paul Fry	0
16	David Walsh (res)	0

- 18 April
- (England) Monmore Green Stadium, Wolverhampton
- Top 8 to British final

Pos.	Rider	Points
1	Joe Screen	14
2	Mark Loram	12+3
3	Simon Cross	12+2
4	Gary Havelock	12+ef
5	Richard Knight	11
6	Andy Smith	10
7	Steve Schofield	9
8	Kenny McKinna	8
9	Scott Lamb	7
10	Scott Smith	7
11	Carl Stonehewer	4
12	Alan Grahame	4
13	David Blackburn	4
14	Les Collins	3
15	Neil Collins	2
16	Paul Dugard	1

== British Final ==
- 1 May 1994
- (England) Brandon Stadium, Coventry
- Top 10 riders qualify for the Commonwealth final as part of the 1994 World Championship

Pos.	Rider	Points	Details
Gold	Andy Smith	12	(2,1,3,3,3)
Silver	Joe Screen	11+3	(0,3,3,2,3)
Bronze	Steve Schofield	11+2	(1,3,3,3,1)
4	Gary Havelock	11+1	(3,1,2,3,2)
5	Dean Barker	10	(3,3,2,1,1)
6	Jeremy Doncaster	9	(3,0,1,2,3)
7	Mark Loram	9	(1,3,3,0,2)
8	Martin Dugard	9	(0,2,2,3,2)
9	Simon Cross	9	(3,2,2,2,0)
10	Chris Louis	7	(2,0,1,2,2)
11	Kelvin Tatum	6	(0,2,1,0,3)
12	Ben Howe	4	(1,2,0,0,1)
13	Richard Knight	4	(2,0,0,1,1)
14	Dave Mullett	3	(2,1,0,X,0)
15	Kenny McKinna	3	(0,1,1,1,0)
16	Paul Hurry	2	(1,0,0,1,0)
17	Scott Lamb	DNS	
18	David Norris	DNS	

== British Under 21 final ==
Paul Hurry won the British Speedway Under 21 Championship. The final was held at Long Eaton Stadium on 6 April.

Pos.	Rider	Points
1	Paul Hurry	15
2	Ben Howe	14
3	James Grieves	11
4	Glenn Cunningham	10
5	Savalas Clouting	9
6	Shaun Tacey	8
7	Phil Morris	8
8	Stuart Swales	8
9	Justin Elkins	6
10	Leigh Lanham	6
11	Mike Hampson	5
12	Emmerson Fairweather	5
13	Mike Smith	5
14	John Jefferies	4
15	Chris Clarence (res)	3
16	Steve Knott	2
17	Jonathan Swales (res)	1
18	Scott Kirton	0

== See also ==
- British Speedway Championship
- 1994 Individual Speedway World Championship
