= 1999 Premier League speedway season =

Speedway season in the United Kingdom

- League: Premier League
- Champions: Sheffield Tigers
- Knockout Cup: Edinburgh Monarchs
- Young Shield: Sheffield Tigers
- National Trophy: Newport Wasps
- Individual: Sean Wilson
- Pairs: Workington Comets
- Fours: Sheffield Tigers
- Highest average: Sean Wilson
- Division/s above: 1999 Elite League
- Division/s below: 1999 Conference League

The 1999 Premier League speedway season was the second division of speedway in the United Kingdom and governed by the Speedway Control Board (SCB), in conjunction with the British Speedway Promoters' Association (BSPA).

== Season summary ==
The League consisted of 13 teams for the 1999 season with the addition of the Swindon Robins who dropped down from the Elite League and a new team, the Workington Comets who replaced the Hull Vikings and the Peterborough Panthers who moved up to the Elite League.

The League was run on a standard format with no play-offs and was won by Sheffield Tigers.

== League ==
=== Final table ===
Pos		M	W	D	L	F	A	Pts	Bon	Tot
1	Sheffield Tigers	24	18	2	4	1229	930	38	12	50
2	Newport Wasps	24	16	1	7	1152	1023	33	9	42
3	Edinburgh Monarchs	24	14	0	10	1151	1024	28	9	37
4	Swindon Robins	24	11	1	12	1110	1061	23	9	32
5	Newcastle Diamonds	24	11	1	12	1103	1066	23	8	31
6	Exeter Falcons	24	13	0	11	1071	1087	26	5	31
7	Berwick Bandits	24	13	1	10	1024	1140	27	4	31
8	Isle of Wight Islanders	24	11	1	12	1085	1078	23	7	30
9	Arena Essex Hammers	24	12	1	11	1081	1081	25	5	30
10	Stoke Potters	24	10	0	14	1026	1138	20	4	24
11	Workington Comets	24	8	1	15	1039	1132	17	3	20
12	Glasgow Tigers	24	9	0	15	999	1160	18	1	19
13	Reading Racers	24	5	1	18	1004	1154	11	2	13

=== Fixtures and results ===
Home \ Away	AE	BER	ED	EX	GLA	IOW	ND	NW	RR	SHE	STO	SWI	WOR
Arena Essex Hammers		59–32	45–48	58–32	46–45	46–44	46–43	47–43	48–42	45–45	54–35	51–39	55–35
Berwick Bandits	47–42		53–37	43–49	49–41	52–38	46–44	45–45	39–33	46–44	48–44	49–41	50–40
Edinburgh Monarchs	56–34	58–32		59–31	48–41	63–27	46–50	56–33	49–40	58–32	65–25	62–28	53–37
Exeter Falcons	42–48	52–38	53–37		62–27	50–40	50–40	46–44	55–35	50–40	52–38	45–44	59–31
Glasgow Tigers	46–44	46–43	49–43	46–44		46–43	46–44	42–48	42–48	44–46	48–43	46–44	46–42
Isle of Wight Islanders	54–36	55–35	59–31	44–46	48–42		41–49	48–42	51–38	43–48	53–36	46–43	55–35
Newcastle Diamonds	50–40	42–47	48–42	52–38	57–32	45–45		44–48	54–36	44–46	53–37	46–44	54–38
Newport Wasps	48–42	62–28	54–38	51–39	47–46	42–48	49–41		59–31	52–38	52–38	51–39	54–36
Reading Racers	43–47	43–47	51–39	50–40	53–38	43–47	49–44	42–48		40–49	46–47	45–47	43–47
Sheffield Tigers	62–38	68–22	60–30	57–32	62–28	54–36	56–33	54–36	55–35		56–34	61–29	49–41
Stoke Potters	46–44	59–33	39–52	58–31	50–39	48–45	48–43	43–47	47–37	43–47		47–43	48–42
Swindon Robins	53–37	53–37	49–41	52–38	53–37	58–32	52–38	43–50	56–36	45–45	57–34		54–39
Workington Comets	51–39	45–48	43–46	55–35	53–36	50–43	44–46	49–42	45–45	42–49	51–39	48–44	

Legend: Blue = home team win; Yellow = draw; Red = away team win.

== Young Shield ==
- End of season competition for the top eight league teams

First round

Team one	Team two	Score
Sheffield	Isle of Wight	56–34, 48–42
Exeter	Edinburgh	59–31, 36–53
Swindon	Newcastle	55–35, 46–44
Berwick	Newport	47–42, 28–62

Semi-final

Team one	Team two	Score
Sheffield	Swindon	54–36, 39–51
Newport	Exeter	50–40, 45–45

Final

Team one	Team two	Score
Sheffield	Newport	57–33, 41–49

== Premier League Knockout Cup ==
The 1999 Premier League Knockout Cup was the 32nd edition of the Knockout Cup for tier two teams. Edinburgh Monarchs were the winners of the competition.

First round

Date	Team one	Score	Team two
17/05	Reading	53-37	Glasgow
23/05	Glasgow	37-46	Reading
21/05	Edinburgh	53-31	Newcastle
23/05	Newcastle	42-27	Edinburgh
23/05	Newport	47-43	Stoke
22/05	Stoke	46-44	Newport
20/05	Sheffield	52-38	Isle of Wight
18/05	Isle of Wight	42-48	Sheffield
24/05	Exeter	67-23	Workington
12/06	Workington	48-42	Exeter

Quarter-finals

Date	Team one	Score	Team two
12/07	Reading	46-44	Sheffield
15/07	Sheffield	55-35	Reading
16/07	Edinburgh	57-33	Newport
04/07	Newport	53-37	Edinburgh
09/07	Arena Essex	55-35	Swindon
29/07	Swindon	53-37	Arena Essex
28/06	Exeter	63-37	Berwick
26/06	Berwick	49-40	Exeter

Semi-finals

Date	Team one	Score	Team two
20/08	Edinburgh	56-34	Sheffield
26/08	Sheffield	55-35	Edinburgh
20/08	Arena Essex	50-39	Exeter
23/08	Exeter	46-44	Arena Essex

Final

Date	Team one	Score	Team two
25/09	Edinburgh	54-36	Arena Essex
16/10	Arena Essex	49-41	Edinburgh

First leg

25 September 1999

Edinburgh Monarchs Peter Carr 14 Blair Scott 13 James Grieves 12 Ross Brady 8 Kevin Little 7 Justin Elkins 0 Brian Turner 0	54 – 36	Arena Essex Hammers Leigh Lanham 10 Gary Corbett 9 Colin White 8 John Wainwright 4 Troy Pratt 3 Roger Lobb 1 Matt Read 1

Armadale Stadium

Second leg

16 October 1999

Arena Essex Hammers Leigh Lanham 12 Troy Pratt 12 Colin White 10 Gary Corbett 5 Roger Lobb 5 Matt Read 4 John Wainwright 1	49 – 41	Edinburgh Monarchs James Grieves 11 Ross Brady 9 Peter Carr 8 Kevin Little 8 Phil Ambrose 4 Blair Scott 2 Justin Elkins R/R

Arena Essex Raceway

Edinburgh were declared Knockout Cup Champions, winning on aggregate 95–85.

== National Trophy ==
North Group

Pos	Team	P	W	D	L	Pts
1	Newcastle	6	6	0	0	12
2	Edinburgh	6	4	0	2	8
3	Glasgow	6	2	0	4	4
4	Berwick	6	0	0	6	0

South Group

Pos	Team	P	W	D	L	Pts
1	Newport	8	5	0	3	10
2	Arena Essex	8	4	0	4	8
3	Exeter	8	4	0	4	8
4	Reading	8	4	0	4	8
5	Isle of Wight	8	3	0	5	6

Home \ Away	BER	ED	GLA	NEW
Berwick		43–50	42–48	43–50
Edinburgh	61–29		56–34	43–47
Glasgow	59–31	44–46		41–50
Newcastle	66–24	48–44	51–39	

Legend: Blue = home team win; Yellow = draw; Red = away team win.

Home \ Away	AE	EX	IOW	NWP	REA
Arena Essex		55–35	53–37	46–44	50–39
Exeter	51–39		41–31	48.5–41.5	57–33
Isle of Wight	52–38	50–40		43–47	47–43
Newport	50–40	58–32	50–39		57–32
Reading	50–40	49–41	51–39	52–38	

Legend: Blue = home team win; Yellow = draw; Red = away team win.

Central Group

Pos	Team	P	W	D	L	Pts
1	Swindon	6	5	0	1	10
2	Sheffield	6	3	0	3	6
3	Workington	6	3	0	3	6
4	Stoke	6	1	0	45	2

Home \ Away	SHE	STO	SWI	WOR
Sheffield		53–39	54–39	58–35
Stoke	47–46		40–49	44–46
Swindon	48–43	51–40		49–40
Workington	47–46	51–41	44–46	

Legend: Blue = home team win; Yellow = draw; Red = away team win.

Semi-final

Team one	Team two	Score
Swindon	Newport	43–47, 30–59
Edinburgh	Newcastle	47–42, 43–47

Final

Team one	Team two	Score
Edinburgh	Newport	52–38, 35–55

== Riders' Championship ==
Sean Wilson won the Riders' Championship. The final was held on 12 September at Owlerton Stadium.

Pos.	Rider	Pts	Total	SF	Final
1	(England) Sean Wilson	3 1 3 3 3	13	-	3
2	(Denmark) Jesper Olsen	2 3 3 3 2	13	3	2
3	(Australia) Craig Watson	3 2 2 0 3	10	2	1
4	(England) Carl Stonehewer	3 3 3 1 3	13	-	0
5	(England) Michael Coles	3 1 1 3 3	11	1	
6	(England) Paul Pickering	2 3 3 2 1	11	0	
7	(England) Glenn Cunningham	2 2 2 1 2	9		
8	(England) Peter Carr	ex 3 2 2 2	9		
9	(England) Les Collins	1 ex 2 2 2	7		
10	(Sweden) Anders Henriksson	1 0 1 3 1	6		
11	(Wales) Phil Morris	1 1 1 2 0	5		
12	(England) Paul Bentley	1 2 0 1 1	5		
13	(England) Leigh Lanham	ex 2 0 1 1	4		
14	(Scotland) James Grieves	2 0 0 0 0	2		
15	(England) Neville Tatum	0 1 1 0 0	2		
16	(England) David Meldrum	0 0 0 0 0	0		

- f=fell, r-retired, ex=excluded, ef=engine failure t=touched tapes

== Pairs ==
The Premier League Pairs Championship was held at Hayley Stadium on 25 July. The event was won by Workington Comets.

Pos	Team	Pts	Riders
1	Workington	38	Stonehewer 20, Werner 18
2	Arena Essex	31	Lanham 18, White 13
3	Newport	28	Smart 18, Watson 10
5	Edinburgh	24	Grieves 20, Little 4
u	Sheffield	?	Wilson, Compton
u	Glasgow	?	Collins, Sanchez
u	Newcastle	?	Olsen, Eriksson

== Fours ==
Sheffield Tigers won the Premier League Four-Team Championship, which was held on 29 August 1999, at the East of England Arena.

Group A
Pos	Team	Pts	Riders
1	isle of Wight	17	Swain 6, Berge 5, Tatum 4, Carter 2
2	Newport	13	Henriksson 5, Appleton 4, Watson 3, Smart 1
3	Swindon	12	Bishop 5, Collins N 3, Masters 2, Cunningham 2
4	Edinburgh	6	Little 4, Grieves 1, Carr P 1, Brady 0

Group B
Pos	Team	Pts	Riders
1	Sheffield	16	Compton 5, Wilson 4, Stead 4, Smith 3
2	Arena Essex	14	Lanham 6, White 4, Lobb 2, Pratt 2
3	Newcastle	11	Olsen 6, Walsh 3, Eriksson 2, Swales 0
4	Glasgow	7	Collins L 4, Bentley 3, Beveridge 0, Felton 0

Final
Pos	Team	Pts	Riders
1	Sheffield	28	Smith 8, Compton 7, Stead 6, Wilson 5, Lee 2
2	Newport	24	Watson 9, Smart 8, Henriksson 5, Appleton 2
3	Isle of Wight	10	Lanham 3, White 3, Lobb 3, Pratt 1
4	Arena Essex	10	Tatum 4, Carter 2, Berge 2, Swain 2

== Final leading averages ==
Rider	Team	Average
(England) Sean Wilson	Sheffield	10.56
(England) Carl Stonehewer	Workington	9.92
(England) Paul Bentley	Glasgow	9.76
(Denmark) Jesper Olsen	Newcastle	9.68
(England) Peter Carr	Edinburgh	9.59
(Australia) Craig Watson	Newport	9.59
(Finland) Petri Kokko	Reading	9.42
(England) Michael Coles	Exeter	9.36
(England) Les Collins	Glasgow	9.23
(England) Leigh Lanham	Arena Essex	9.10

== Riders & final averages ==
Arena Essex

- Leigh Lanham 9.10
- Colin White 8.76
- Troy Pratt 7.19
- Gary Corbett 5.99
- Matt Read 5.37
- Roger Lobb 5.33
- John Wainwright 3.59

Berwick

- Scott Lamb 8.65
- Mick Powell 8.63
- Alan Mogridge 7.05
- Claus Kristensen 6.20
- David Meldrum 6.09
- Tom P. Madsen 6.04
- Wesley Waite 4.33
- Dean Felton 4.04
- Freddie Stephenson 3.35
- Phil Pickering 2.27

Edinburgh

- Peter Carr 9.59
- James Grieves 9.02
- Kevn Little 7.84
- Ross Brady 6.99
- Blair Scott 5.67
- Stewart McDonald 5.32
- David McAllan 4.06
- Jonathan Swales 2.88
- James Birkinshaw 2.52
- Justin Elkins 1.91

Exeter

- Michael Coles 9.36
- Mark Simmonds 8.03
- Graeme Gordon 7.75
- Lee Dicken 6.46
- Wayne Barrett 5.39
- Chris Harris 4.86
- Gary Lobb 4.03
- Chris Courage 2.24

Glasgow

- Paul Bentley 9.76
- Les Collins 9.23
- Mick Powell 8.16
- Emiliano Sanchez 7.14
- Will Beveridge 6.28
- Sean Courtney 4.48
- Brian Turner 3.59
- Stuart Coleman 2.25
- Jitendra Duffill 1.36
- Scott Courtney 1.14

Isle of Wight

- Neville Tatum 8.54
- Scott Swain 8.02
- Philippe Bergé 7.46
- Danny Bird 6.39
- Wayne Carter 5.74
- Tommy Palmer 5.70
- Nick Simmons 4.45
- Jeremy Barraud 2.67
- Glen Phillips 1.47

Newcastle

- Jesper Olsen 9.68
- Robert Eriksson 8.93
- David Walsh 8.82
- Stuart Swales 7.67
- Derrol Keats 5.75
- Paul Gould 5.60
- Jonathan Swales 3.89
- Anthony Barlow 3.55
- Steven Jones 3.51

Newport

- Craig Watson 9.59
- Anders Henriksson 9.02
- Emil Lindqvist 8.86
- Frank Smart 8.51
- Scott Pegler 6.61
- Bjorn Gustafsson 5.58
- Chris Neath 5.50
- Andrew Appleton 5.47
- Bobby Eldridge 3.75

Reading

- Petri Kokko 9.42
- Dave Mullett 9.04
- Per Wester 9.00
- Phil Morris 7.49
- Paul Clews 5.70
- Justin Elkins 5.59
- Jarno Kosonen 4.51
- Marc Norris 3.83
- Shane Colvin 2.35
- Peter Collyer 1.81

Sheffield

- Sean Wilson 10.56
- Andre Compton 9.00
- Scott Smith 8.05
- Simon Stead 7.76
- Paul Lee 5.96
- Simon Cartwright 5.54
- Peter Boast 3.69
- Adam Allott 3.00

Stoke

- Paul Pickering 9.03
- Mark Burrows 6.55
- Paul Fry 6.47
- Tony Atkin 6.21
- Jon Armstrong 5.92
- Joachim Kugelmann 5.44
- Rene Aas 5.01
- Rob Clarence 3.51
- Wayne Broadhurst 3.41

Swindon

- Glenn Cunningham 8.81
- Neil Collins 8.13
- Steve Masters 7.96
- Oliver Allen 5.67
- Seemond Stephens 5.45
- Steve Bishop 5.16
- Krister Marsh 4.92
- David Mason 4.00

Workington

- Carl Stonehewer 9.92
- Brent Werner 7.70
- Peter Ingvar Karlsson 6.36
- Grant MacDonald 6.00
- Barry Campbell 5.12
- Peter Scully 5.00
- Geoff Powell 4.44
- Darren Groves 4.34
- Wayne Broadhurst 3.07
- James Birkinshaw 2.74
- Mark Blackwell 2.21

== See also ==
- List of United Kingdom Speedway League Champions
- Knockout Cup (speedway)
