= 1996 British Speedway Championship =

Seasons
- ← 1995 1997 →

The 1996 British Speedway Championship was the 36th edition of the British Speedway Championship. The Final took place on 28 April at Brandon in Coventry, England. The Championship was won by Joe Screen, who won the 'A Final' ahead of Chris Louis, Carl Stonehewer and Kelvin Tatum.

== British Final ==
- 28 April 1996
- (England) Brandon Stadium, Coventry

=== Qualifying ===
Pos.	Rider	Points	Details
1	Joe Screen	14	(3,3,3,2,3)
2	Chris Louis	12	(X,3,3,3,3)
3	Carl Stonehewer	11	(2,2,3,1,3)
4	Kelvin Tatum	10	(3,2,2,3,X)
5	Gary Havelock	9	(2,1,3,0,3)
6	Andy Smith	8	(3,1,2,0,2)
7	David Walsh	8	(2,3,1,2,0)
8	Ray Morton	8	(1,0,2,3,2)
9	Simon Cross	8	(1,2,2,1,2)
10	Ben Howe	7	(0,3,0,3,1)
11	Dave Mullett	6	(3,1,0,1,1)
12	David Norris	6	(2,0,0,2,2)
13	Neil Collins	5	(1,0,1,2,1)
14	Alun Rossiter	4	(0,2,1,1,X)
15	Paul Thorp	3	(1,1,1,0,0)
16	James Grieves	1	(0,0,0,X,1)

=== A Final ===
Pos.	Rider	Points
Gold	Joe Screen	3
Silver	Chris Louis	2
Bronze	Carl Stonehewer	1
4	Kelvin Tatum	X

=== B Final ===
Pos.	Rider	Points
5	Andy Smith	3
6	Gary Havelock	2
7	David Walsh	1
8	Ray Morton	0

=== C Final ===
Pos.	Rider	Points
9	David Norris	3
10	Simon Cross	2
11	Ben Howe	1
12	Dave Mullett	0

== British Under 21 final ==
Savalas Clouting won the British Speedway Under 21 Championship. The final was held in Swindon on 27 April.

Pos.	Rider	Points
1	Savalas Clouting	13+3
2	Scott Nicholls	13+2
3	Paul Hurry	12
4	Stuart Robson	11
5	Leigh Lanham	10
6	Phil Morris	9
7	Andre Compton	8
8	Stewart McDonald	7
9	Stuart Swales	7
10	Steve Knott	7
11	Glenn Cunningham	7
12	John Wilson	7
13	Graeme Gordon	3
14	David Mason	2
15	Will Beveridge	2
16	Paul Clews	0
