= 1997 Elite League speedway season =

British motorcycle speedway season

- League: Sky Sports Elite League
- Champions: Bradford Dukes
- Knockout Cup: Eastbourne Eagles
- Craven Shield: Coventry Bees
- Individual: Greg Hancock
- Fours: Peterborough Panthers
- Highest average: Tony Rickardsson
- Division/s below: 1997 Premier League; 1997 Conference League

The 1997 Elite League speedway season was the 63rd season of the top tier of speedway in the United Kingdom. It was the first season of a new league known as the Elite League and was governed by the Speedway Control Board (SCB), in conjunction with the British Speedway Promoters' Association (BSPA).

== Season summary ==
In 1997, the single speedway league in Great Britain separated after two seasons, forming a new top division. The inaugural league consisted of ten teams. The league operated on a standard format without play-offs. The Craven Shield was introduced as an end of season cup competition for the top eight teams in the league standings.

Bradford Dukes finally won the league, their first success since 1966 when they raced as Halifax Dukes. Bradford retained top English riders Gary Havelock and Joe Screen but crucially brought in Mark Loram from Exeter Falcons. Loram had a superb season that included becoming the new British Champion.

== Final table ==
Pos		M	W	D	L	F	A	Pts	Bon	Tot
1	Bradford Dukes	36	23	1	12	1733	1506	47	15	62
2	Eastbourne Eagles	36	20	0	16	1665	1570	40	11	51
3	Swindon Robins	36	20	1	15	1662	1578	41	9	50
4	Ipswich Witches	36	16	2	17	1671	1616	34	13	47
5	King's Lynn Knights	36	18	3	15	1592	1645	39	8	47
6	Belle Vue Aces	36	18	0	18	1646	1587	36	9	45
7	Wolverhampton Wolves	36	18	0	18	1572	1658	36	6	42
8	Coventry Bees	36	15	1	20	1582	1653	31	7	38
9	Poole Pirates	36	13	2	21	1551	1684	28	6	34
10	Peterborough Panthers	36	14	0	22	1556	1679	28	5	33

=== 'A' Fixtures ===
Home \ Away	BV	BD	COV	EAS	IPS	KL	PET	PP	SWI	WOL
Belle Vue Aces		48–42	42–47	54–36	51–38	63–27	51–39	61–29	53–37	52–38
Bradford Dukes	51–39		50–40	55–35	58–32	52–38	42–48	44–45	46–44	55–35
Coventry Bees	48–42	44–46		48–42	50–40	42–48	39–51	50–40	41–49	51–39
Eastbourne Eagles	48–42	58–32	56–34		63–27	53–37	56–33	59–31	48–42	42–46
Ipswich Witches	44–45	51–39	56–34	60–30		50–40	49–41	51–39	55–37	57–33
King's Lynn Knights	47–43	41–49	48–42	56–34	50–40		50–40	50–40	51–39	50–40
Peterborough Panthers	53–37	40–50	50–40	46–44	41–49	44–46		43–47	41–49	42–47
Poole Pirates	39–51	37–53	48–42	44–46	50–40	52–38	44–46		45–45	47–43
Swindon Robins	51–39	47–43	50–40	54–36	52–38	46–44	47–43	55–35		56–34
Wolverhampton Wolves	51–39	49–41	46–43	59–31	53–37	53–36	51–39	56–33	48–42	

Legend: Blue = home team win; Yellow = draw; Red = away team win.

=== 'B' Fixtures ===
Home \ Away	BV	BD	COV	EAS	IPS	KL	PET	PP	SWI	WOL
Belle Vue Aces		44–46	52–38	57–33	55–33	56–34	47–43	50–40	54–36	48–42
Bradford Dukes	53–37		45–45	59–31	60–30	57–33	54–36	36–54	52–38	58–32
Coventry Bees	53–36	52–28		53–37	52–38	40–49	47–43	58–32	54–36	60–30
Eastbourne Eagles	51–39	56–34	54–36		49–41	61–29	66–24	55–35	55–35	52–37
Ipswich Witches	58–32	39–51	57–32	59–31		45–45	44–45	52–38	47–43	57–32
King's Lynn Knights	49–41	48–42	46–44	48–42	45–45		53–37	52–38	42–48	58–32
Peterborough Panthers	57–33	41–49	50–40	53–36	41–49	50–40		48–41	49–41	51–39
Poole Pirates	53–36	35–55	65–25	44–46	48–42	45–45	58–32		48–42	61–28
Swindon Robins	54–36	49–41	43–47	47–43	59–31	53–37	49–41	57–33		54–36
Wolverhampton Wolves	49–41	35–55	59–31	40–50	52–38	47–42	55–35	52–38	54–36	

Legend: Blue = home team win; Yellow = draw; Red = away team win.

== Elite League Knockout Cup ==
The 1997 Elite League Knockout Cup, sponsored by the Speedway Star, was the 59th edition of the Knockout Cup for tier one teams but the first under its new name. Eastbourne Eagles were the winners of the competition.

First round

Group A

Date	Team one	Score	Team two
15/03	Coventry	51-40	Swindon
16/03	Swindon	41-49	Coventry
21/03	Belle Vue	48-42	Coventry
22/03	Coventry	45-45	Wolverhampton
22/03	Bradford	56-34	Swindon
23/03	Swindon	47-42	Bradford
24/03	Wolverhampton	52-38	Swindon
28/03	Belle Vue	56-33	Wolverhampton
29/03	Swindon	56-34	Belle Vue
29/03	Bradford	58-32	Wolverhampton
31/03	Coventry	49-41	Bradford
31/03	Wolverhampton	52-38	Belle Vue
04/04	Belle Vue	46-44	Bradford
05/04	Bradford	52-38	Coventry
05/04	Swindon	65-25	Wolverhampton
11/04	Belle Vue	52-40	Swindon
12/04	Coventry	51-41	Belle Vue
14/04	Wolverhampton	50-40	Coventry
19/04	Bradford	57-33	Belle Vue
28/04	Wolverhampton	44-46	Bradford

Pos	Team	P	W	D	L
1	Bradford	8	5	0	3
2	Coventry	8	4	1	3
3	Belle Vue	8	4	0	4
4	Wolverhampton	8	3	1	4
5	Swindon	8	3	0	5

Group B

Date	Team one	Score	Team two
20/03	Ipswich	47-43	Peterborough
21/03	Peterborough	41-49	Kings Lynn
23/03	Eastbourne	53-37	Ipswich
28/03	Ipswich	50-40	Kings Lynn
28/03	Peterborough	62-27	Eastbourne
30/03	Eastbourne	54-36	Poole
02/04	Poole	53-37	Kings Lynn
03/04	Ipswich	44-46	Eastbourne
06/04	Eastbourne	55-35	Kings Lynn
09/04	Kings Lynn	46-44	Eastbourne
09/04	Poole	52-38	Peterborough
10/04	Ipswich	41-49	Poole
11/04	Peterborough	38-52	Poole
12/04	Kings Lynn	37-52	Poole
16/04	Kings Lynn	47-43	Peterborough
16/04	Poole	57-33	Ipswich
18/04	Peterborough	48-42	Ipswich
19/04	Eastbourne	52-37	Peterborough
23/04	Poole	73-17	Eastbourne
30/04	Kings Lynn	41-49	Ipswich

Pos	Team	P	W	D	L
1	Poole	8	7	0	1
2	Eastbourne	8	5	0	3
3	King's Lynn	8	3	0	5
4	Peterborough	8	3	0	5
5	Ipswich	8	2	0	6

Semi-finals

Date	Team one	Score	Team two
02/07	Poole	53-37	Coventry
15/06	Coventry	48-42	Poole
15/07	Bradford	56-34	Eastbourne
13/04	Eastbourne	58-32	Bradford

=== Final ===
First leg

4 September 1997

Poole Pirates Craig Boyce 18 Lars Gunnestad 10	43 - 49	Eastbourne Eagles Stefan Andersson 10 Gary Havelock (guest) 10 David Norris 8 Stefan Danno 7 Alan Mogridge 5

Wimborne Road

Second leg

7 September 1997

Eastbourne Eagles Martin Dugard 14 Ronnie Correy (guest) 14 Stefan Andersson 13 Stefan Danno 12 David Norris 8 Alan Mogridge 6	67 - 23	Poole Pirates Craig Boyce 7 Mark Lemon 5 Armando Castagna 4 Ben Howe 3 Lars Gunnestad 2 Savalas Clouting 2

Arlington Stadium

Eastbourne Eagles were declared Knockout Cup Champions, winning on aggregate 116-66.

== Craven Shield ==
- End of season competition for the top eight league teams

First Round

Team one	Team two	Score
Ipswich	King's Lynn	50–40, 39–51
Bradford	Coventry	55–35, 34–56
Eastbourne	Wolverhampton	52–38, 51–38
Swindon	Belle Vue	60–30, n–h

Semi-final

Team one	Team two	Score
Coventry	Swindon	50–40, 49–41
King's Lynn	Eastbourne	53–36, 37–52

Final

Team one	Team two	Score
King's Lynn	Coventry	41–49, 32–58

== Riders' Championship ==
Greg Hancock won the Elite League Riders' Championship, held at Odsal Stadium on 11 October.

Pos.	Rider	Total	Total	SF	Final
1	(United States) Greg Hancock	2 1 3 3 3	12	x	3
2	(Sweden) Tony Rickardsson	2 3 2 3 3	13	x	2
3	(England) Chris Louis	3 3 1 2 2	11	2	1
4	(England) Simon Wigg	1 0 3 2 3	9	3	0
5	(England) Mark Loram	1 2 3 1 2	9	1	
6	(United States) Billy Hamill	3 TX 0 3 3	9	0	
7	(United States) Sam Ermolenko	3 1 2 0 2	8		
8	(Australia) Craig Boyce	1 1 3 2 1	8		
9	(England) Joe Screen	2 3 1 1 1	8		
10	(Australia) Jason Crump	0 2 2 3 0	7		
11	(England) Martin Dugard	2 3 0 0 1	6		
12	(Denmark) Brian Andersen	0 2 1 2 1	6		
13	(Sweden) Peter Karlsson	0 1 2 1 2	6		
14	(Sweden) Mikael Karlsson	3 0 1 TX 0	4		
15	(England) Garry Stead (res)	2 0	2		
16	(Australia) Leigh Adams	1 0 0 0 0	1		
17	(Australia) Steve Johnston	0 0 0 1 0	1		

- tx-touched tapes, excluded

== Fours ==
Peterborough Panthers won the Elite League Four Team Tournament, which was held on 3 August 1997, at the East of England Arena.

Final
Pos	Team	Pts	Riders
1	Peterborough	27	Crump 9, Sullivan 6
2	Bradford	21	Screen 10
3	Swindon	15	Adams 10
4	Belle Vue	15	Hamill 6

== Final leading averages ==
Rider	Team	Average
(Sweden) Tony Rickardsson	Ipswich	10.09
(United States) Billy Hamill	Belle Vue	10.07
(United States) Greg Hancock	Coventry	9.85
(England) Joe Screen	Bradford	9.77
(Australia) Leigh Adams	Swindon	9.76
(Australia) Jason Crump	Peterborough	9.71
(England) Mark Loram	Bradford	9.59
(Australia) Craig Boyce	Poole	9.43
(England) Chris Louis	Ipswich	9.42
(Denmark) Brian Andersen	Coventry	9.02

== Riders & final averages ==
Belle Vue

- (United States) Billy Hamill 10.07
- (United States) Sam Ermolenko 8.48
- (Australia) Jason Lyons 7.74
- (United States) Charlie Venegas 5.58
- (United States) Chris Manchester 5.56
- (England) Paul Thorp 4.17
- (England) Paul Smith 1.62
- (New Zealand) Nathan Murray 0.97

Bradford

- (England) Joe Screen 9.77
- (England) Mark Loram 9.59
- (England) Gary Havelock 7.59
- (England) Garry Stead 5.78
- (United States) Josh Larsen 5.70
- (England) David Walsh 4.45

Coventry

- (United States) Greg Hancock 9.85
- (Denmark) Brian Andersen 9.02
- (Denmark) John Jørgensen 6.90
- (England) Andy Smith 5.84
- (England) Sean Wilson 5.67
- (England) Simon Cross 5.13
- (Australia) Shane Bowes 4.15
- (England) Paul Smith 1.44

Eastbourne

- (England) Martin Dugard 8.44
- (Sweden) Stefan Andersson 8.24
- (England) Dean Barker 7.32
- (Sweden) Stefan Dannö 6.97
- (England) David Norris 6.57
- (England) Alan Mogridge 4.56

Ipswich

- (Sweden) Tony Rickardsson 10.09
- (England) Chris Louis 9.42
- (Australia) Steve Johnston 7.74
- (England) Scott Nicholls 6.25
- (England) Ben Howe 6.17
- (England) Jeremy Doncaster 6.11
- (Czech Republic) Antonín Šváb Jr. 3.62

King's Lynn

- (England) Simon Wigg 8.07
- (Australia) Shane Parker 7.48
- (Czech Republic) Tomáš Topinka 7.24
- (Czech Republic) Bohumil Brhel 6.91
- (England) Paul Hurry 6.26
- (United States) Charles Ermolenko 5.14
- (England) Shaun Tacey 3.11

Peterborough

- (Australia) Jason Crump 9.71
- (England) Kelvin Tatum 7.80
- (Australia) Ryan Sullivan 7.71
- (Denmark) Hans Clausen 7.22
- (Denmark) Ronni Pedersen 7.08
- (Czech Republic) Zdeněk Tesař 4.95
- (Czech Republic) Marián Jirout 4.90
- (Denmark) Rene Madsen 2.52

Poole

- (Australia) Craig Boyce 9.43
- (Norway) Lars Gunnestad 7.48
- (England) Marvyn Cox 7.30
- (Australia) Mark Lemon 6.43
- (England) Steve Schofield 6.18
- (Italy) Armando Castagna 4.80
- (England) Savalas Clouting 4.77
- (England) Ben Howe 4.45

Swindon

- (Australia) Leigh Adams 9.76
- (Sweden) Jimmy Nilsen 8.96
- (Denmark) Brian Karger 8.12
- (Sweden) Tony Olsson 6.68
- (England) Alun Rossiter 4.68
- (England) Steve Masters 2.53

Wolverhampton

- (Sweden) Mikael Karlsson 8.62
- (Sweden) Peter Karlsson 8.37
- (United States) Ronnie Correy 7.08
- (Denmark) Jesper B. Jensen 5.45
- (United States) Charles Ermolenko 4.76
- (Czech Republic) George Štancl 4.55
- (Scotland) James Grieves 4.16

== See also ==
- List of United Kingdom Speedway League Champions
- Knockout Cup (speedway)
