= 1995 British Speedway Championship =

Seasons
- ← 1994 1996 →

The 1995 British Speedway Championship was the 35th edition of the British Speedway Championship. The Final took place on 30 April at Brandon in Coventry, England. The Championship was won by Andy Smith, the third time in succession that he had won the title. Joe Screen finished second ahead of Dean Barker in third.

== British Final ==
- 30 April 1995
- (England) Brandon Stadium, Coventry

Pos.	Rider	Points	Details
Gold	Andy Smith	15	(3,3,3,3,3)
Silver	Joe Screen	14	(3,3,3,2,3)
Bronze	Dean Barker	12	(2,2,2,3,3)
4	Gary Havelock	11	(3,0,3,3,2)
5	Martin Dugard	11	(2,1,3,3,2)
6	Chris Louis	11	(2,2,2,2,3)
7	David Norris	8	(3,1,2,1,1)
8	Martin Dixon	8	(1,2,1,2,2)
9	Garry Stead	6	(1,1,0,2,2)
10	Neil Collins	6	(1,2,1,1,1)
11	Paul Hurry	4	(0,3,0,1,0)
12	David Walsh	4	(2,0,1,0,1)
13	Scott Robson	3	(0,3,0,0,0)
14	Simon Cross	3	(0,0,2,1,0)
15	Ben Howe	3	(1,1,0,0,1)
16	Ray Morton	1	(0,0,1,0,0)
17	Kenny McKinna	DNS	

== British Under 21 final ==
Ben Howe won the British Speedway Under 21 Championship. The final was held at Foxhall Stadium on 27 April.

Pos.	Rider	Points
1	Ben Howe	15
2	Paul Hurry	12+3
3	Savalas Clouting	12+2
4	Leigh Lanham	10
5	Mike Smith	10
6	Scott Nicholls	9+3
7	Stuart Robson	9+2
8	Phil Morris	9
9	Steve Knott	8
10	Glenn Cunningham	7
11	Darren Spicer	5
12	Shaun Tacey	4
13	James Grieves	3
14	Stuart Swales	3
15	Darren Pearson	2
16	Will Beveridge (res)	2
17	Justin Elkins	0

== See also ==
- British Speedway Championship
