= 2001 Elite League speedway season =

British motorcycle speedway season

- League: Sky Sports Elite League
- Champions: Oxford Cheetahs
- Knockout Cup: Peterborough Panthers
- Craven Shield: Poole Pirates
- Riders Championship: Jason Crump
- Highest average: Jason Crump
- Division/s below: Premier League; Conference League

The 2001 Elite League speedway season was the 67th season of top division of speedway in the United Kingdom and in 2001 was governed by the Speedway Control Board (SCB), in conjunction with the British Speedway Promoters' Association (BSPA).

== Season summary ==
In 2001, the league consisted of nine teams and operated on a standard format without play-offs. Oxford Cheetahs won their first title since 1989. Leigh Adams was brought in from King's Lynn to lead the team that retained fellow Australian riders Todd Wiltshire and Steve Johnston, Czech brothers Lukáš Dryml and Aleš Dryml Jr. and Dane Brian Andersen. In a closely fought three way title battle they claimed the crown ahead of Poole and Coventry. Poole were led by three times World Champion Tony Rickardsson who would claim his fourth Speedway World Championship during the season. Jason Crump was runner-up in the World Championship and topped the league averages for King's Lynn.

== League ==
=== Final table ===
Pos		M	W	D	L	F	A	Pts	Bon	Tot
1	Oxford Cheetahs	32	20	5	7	1495	1367	45	13	58
2	Poole Pirates	32	21	2	9	1538	1325	44	13	57
3	Coventry Bees	32	21	2	9	1518	1356	44	11	55
4	Ipswich Witches	32	17	2	13	1444	1429	36	7	43
5	Peterborough Panthers	30	12	2	16	1356	1329	26	7	33
6	King's Lynn Knights	31	12	1	19	1381	1467	25	7	32
7	Eastbourne Eagles	32	11	3	18	1373	1463	25	7	32
8	Wolverhampton Wolves	32	12	0	20	1397	1478	24	4	28
9	Belle Vue Aces	30	7	1	22	1196	1484	15	1	16

_{Peterborough's home fixtures with Belle Vue were not held.}

=== 'A' Fixtures ===
Home \ Away	BV	COV	EAS	IPS	KL	OX	PET	PP	WOL
Belle Vue Aces		42–48	49–41	45–45	46–44	47–42	47–43	42–50	44–46
Coventry Bees	56–34		43–47	48–42	47–43	40–50	62–28	41–49	47–43
Eastbourne Eagles	51–39	45–45		40–50	75–0+	45–45	49–41	44–46	49–41
Ipswich Witches	56–34	39–51	49–29		47–42	49–41	42–48	47–43	50–40
King's Lynn Knights	46–44	42–48	59–31	50–40		44–46	50–40	49–41	51–41
Oxford Cheetahs	59–31	52–38	47–43	46–44	45–45		38–34	54–36	47–43
Peterborough Panthers	n/a	46–44	45–45	42–50	55–35	44–46		42–48	54–36
Poole Pirates	60–30	45–45	54–36	44–46	51–39	45–45	50–40		54–36
Wolverhampton Wolves	52–38	37–47	43–47	42–51	48–42	53–37	42–48	49–40	

Legend: Blue = home team win; Yellow = draw; Red = away team win.

+awarded

=== 'B' Fixtures ===
Home \ Away	BV	COV	EAS	IPS	KL	OX	PET	PP	WOL
Belle Vue Aces		44–46	42–30	42–48	47–43	42–48	47–42	32–58	40–50
Coventry Bees	52–38		65–25	48–42	48–42	47–43	40–50	52–38	448–42
Eastbourne Eagles	64–26	39–51		40–50	51–39	41–51	47–42	44–46	51–39
Ipswich Witches	49–41	43–47	56–34		48–44	45–45	39–51	46–44	47–43
King's Lynn Knights	51–38	48–42	51–39	49–40		44–46	48–45	42–48	53–37
Oxford Cheetahs	53–36	37–53	44–46	59–31	52–38		53–37	46–44	48–42
Peterborough Panthers	n/a	455–35	62–28	57–33	49–41	45–45		44–46	58–32
Poole Pirates	57–33	48–42	56–34	49–41	42–30	52–38	56–34		54–36
Wolverhampton Wolves	54–36	38–52	47–43	51–39	50–37	43–47	55–35	46–44	

Legend: Blue = home team win; Yellow = draw; Red = away team win.

== Elite League Knockout Cup ==
The 2001 Elite League Knockout Cup was the 63rd edition of the Knockout Cup for tier one teams. Peterborough Panthers were the winners of the competition.

First round

Date	Team one	Score	Team two
04/04	Poole	50-40	Ipswich
17/05	Ipswich	56-34	Poole

Second round

Date	Team one	Score	Team two
09/07	Reading	50-40	Exeter
08/07	Stoke	41-48	Hull
12/05	Coventry	39-50	Peterborough
12/05	Eastbourne	50-40	Oxford
11/05	Oxford	53-37	Eastbourne
11/05	Peterborough	50-40	Coventry
09/05	King's Lynn	56-34	Belle Vue
07/05	Belle Vue	39-47	King's Lynn

Semi-finals

Date	Team one	Score	Team two
09/10	Ipswich	46-44	Oxford
14/09	Oxford	45-45	Ipswich
14/09	Peterborough	49-41	King's Lynn
12/09	King's Lynn	38-33	Peterborough

Final

First leg

25 October 2001

Peterborough Panthers Ryan Sullivan 13	51 - 39	Ipswich Witches Scott Nicholls 14

East of England Showground

Second leg

27 October 2001

Ipswich Witches Scott Nicholls 14 Craig Boyce 9 Jarek Hampel 8 Jeremy Doncaster 8 Chris Louis 7 Savalas Clouting 2 Carl Baldwin 0	48 - 42	Peterborough Panthers Mark Loram 12 Ryan Sullivan 11 Nigel Sadler 8 Mario Jirout 6 David Howe 4 Shane Parker 1 Sam Tesar r/r

Foxhall Stadium

Peterborough Panthers were declared Knockout Cup Champions, winning on aggregate 93-87.

== Craven Shield ==
Anglia

Pos	Team	M	W	D	L	Pts
1	Peterborough	4	4	0	0	8
2	King's Lynn	4	2	0	2	4
3	Ipswich	4	0	0	4	0

Midland

Pos	Team	M	W	D	L	Pts
1	Wolverhampton	4	4	0	0	8
2	Coventry	4	2	0	2	4
3	Belle Vue	4	0	0	4	0

South

Pos	Team	M	W	D	L	Pts
1	Poole	4	4	0	0	8
2	Oxford	4	1	0	3	2
3	Eastbourne	4	1	0	3	2

Home \ Away	IPS	KL	PET
Ipswich		44–46	33–39
King's Lynn	47–43		42–48
Peterborough	59–31	46–44	

Legend: Blue = home team win; Yellow = draw; Red = away team win.

Home \ Away	BV	COV	WOL
Belle Vue		40–50	37–53
Coventry	47–43		39–51
Wolverhampton	54–36	46–44	

Legend: Blue = home team win; Yellow = draw; Red = away team win.

Home \ Away	EAS	OX	PP
Eastbourne		51–39	36–54
Oxford	47–43		42–48
Poole	57–33	53–37	

Legend: Blue = home team win; Yellow = draw; Red = away team win.

Final

Leg	Team one	Team two	Team three	Score
1	Peterborough	Poole	Wolverhampton	42–43–23
2	Wolverhampton	Peterborough	Poole	41–39–28
3	Poole	Peterborough	Wolverhampton	46–30–32

== Riders' Championship ==
Jason Crump won the Elite League Riders' Championship for the second time. The final was held at Owlerton Stadium on 20 September.

Pos.	Rider	Pts	Total	SF	Final
1	(Australia) Jason Crump	3 3 3 3 2	14	x	3
2	(England) Scott Nicholls	3 1 3 2 3	12	x	2
3	(Denmark) Nicki Pedersen	1 3 2 3 2	11	3	1
4	(Sweden) Mikael Karlsson	2 2 2 3 2	11	2	0
5	(Australia) Craig Boyce	0 1 3 2 3	9	1	
6	(Sweden) Tony Rickardsson	3 3 2 1 0	9	0	
7	(Australia) Ryan Sullivan	3 1 1 1 3	9		
8	(England) Lee Richardson	2 3 2 2 0	9		
9	(Australia) Leigh Adams	1 2 1 1 3	8		
10	(England) Mark Loram	0 2 0 3 2	7		
11	(United States) Sam Ermolenko	2 1 1 2 1	7		
12	(Australia) Jason Lyons	1 2 3 0 0	6		
13	(England) Dean Barker	2 0 0 1 1	4		
14	(Poland) Krzysztof Cegielski	1 0 1 0 1	3		
15	(Australia) Steve Johnston	0 0 0 0 0	0		
16	(England) David Norris	0 0 0	0		
17	(England) David Howe (res)	1	1		
18	(England) Paul Lee (res)	0	0		

== Leading final averages ==
Rider	Team	Average
(Australia) Jason Crump	King's Lynn	10.39
(England) Scott Nicholls	Ipswich	10.11
(Australia) Leigh Adams	Oxford	10.08
(Sweden) Tony Rickardsson	Poole	9.66
(Australia) Ryan Sullivan	Peterborough	9.52
(United States) Billy Hamill	Coventry	9.26
(United States) Greg Hancock	Coventry	9.05
(Denmark) Nicki Pedersen	King's Lynn	9.01
(Sweden) Mikael Karlsson	Wolverhampton	9.00
(Sweden) Peter Karlsson	King's Lynn	8.75

== Riders & final averages ==
Belle Vue

- (Sweden) Peter Karlsson 8.00
- (Sweden) Jimmy Nilsen 7.78
- (Australia) Jason Lyons 6.74
- (Finland) Kai Laukkanen 6.33
- (Slovenia) Matej Ferjan 6.14
- (England) Andy Smith 5.81
- (Czech Republic) Tomáš Topinka 4.74
- (England) Neil Collins 4.21
- (Sweden) Henka Gustaffson 4.13
- (Poland) Tomasz Jędrzejak 4.00
- (England) Wayne Carter 3.79
- (Poland) Adam Labedzki 3.65

Coventry

- (United States) Billy Hamill 9.26
- (United States) Greg Hancock 9.05
- (Sweden) Andreas Jonsson 7.90
- (England) Lee Richardson 7.44
- (England) Stuart Robson 5.39
- (United States) Billy Janniro 5.17
- (England) Paul Lee 2.88

Eastbourne

- (England) Martin Dugard 8.16
- (England) Joe Screen 7.60
- (England) Dean Barker 6.80
- (England) David Norris 6.70
- (Czech Republic) Antonín Šváb Jr. 6.46
- (Sweden) Stefan Andersson 6.07
- (Poland) Roman Povazhny 6.00
- (United States) Brent Werner 5.42
- (Finland) Joonas Kylmäkorpi 5.39
- (Sweden) Marcus Andersson 5.06

Ipswich

- (England) Scott Nicholls 10.11
- (Australia) Craig Boyce 8.06
- (England) Chris Louis 7.79
- (Poland) Jarosław Hampel 7.35
- (England) Jeremy Doncaster 6.35
- (New Zealand) Jason Bunyan 2.66
- (England) Savalas Clouting 2.08

King's Lynn

- (Australia) Jason Crump 10.39
- (Denmark) Nicki Pedersen 9.01
- (Sweden) Peter Karlsson 8.75
- (Sweden) Niklas Klingberg 6.76
- (Denmark) Ronni Pedersen 6.64
- (Denmark) Tom P. Madsen 5.20
- (Sweden) Freddie Eriksson 4.71
- (Poland) Tomasz Bajerski 4.00
- (Australia) Lee Redmond 2.08
- (Germany) Joachim Kugelmann 1.83

Oxford

- (Australia) Leigh Adams 10.08
- (Australia) Todd Wiltshire 7.16
- (Denmark) Brian Andersen 6.99
- (Czech Republic) Lukáš Dryml 6.75
- (Australia) Steve Johnston 6.47
- (Czech Republic) Aleš Dryml Jr. 6.12
- (England) Andrew Appleton 2.73

Peterborough

- (Australia) Ryan Sullivan 9.52
- (England) Mark Loram 8.37
- (England) Simon Stead 7.31
- (Slovenia) Matej Ferjan 6.59
- (Australia) Shane Parker 6.18
- (England) David Howe 5.86
- (Australia) Nigel Sadler 5.66
- (Czech Republic) Marián Jirout 5.23
- (England) Grant MacDonald 0.38

Poole

- (Sweden) Tony Rickardsson 9.66
- (Poland) Krzysztof Cegielski 8.34
- (England) Gary Havelock 8.16
- (Denmark) Hans N. Andersen 6.73
- (Poland) Grzegorz Walasek 6.53
- (Norway) Lars Gunnestad 6.51
- (Sweden) Magnus Zetterström 5.86
- (Australia) Craig Watson 4.87
- (Sweden) David Ruud 4.42

Wolverhampton

- (Sweden) Mikael Karlsson 9.00
- (United States) Sam Ermolenko 7.34
- (England) Paul Hurry 7.33
- (Denmark) Jesper B. Jensen 5.71
- (Sweden) Daniel Nermark 5.62
- (Poland) Krzysztof Jabłoński 4.70
- (England) Alun Rossiter 2.76
- (England) Wayne Broadhurst 1.69

== See also ==
- Speedway in the United Kingdom
- List of United Kingdom Speedway League Champions
- Knockout Cup (speedway)
