= 1993 British Speedway Championship =

Seasons
- ← 1992 1994 →

The 1993 British Speedway Championship was the 33rd edition of the British Speedway Championship. The Final took place on 9 May at Brandon in Coventry, England. The Championship was won by Andy Smith, while Joe Screen won a run-off against Gary Havelock to finish second.

== First round ==
Date	Venue	Winner	2nd	3rd
1 April	Owlerton Stadium, Sheffield	Carl Stonehewer	David Blackburn	Eric Monaghan
2 April	Powderhall Stadium, Edinburgh	Kenny McKinna	Scott Lamb	Les Collins
10 April	Abbey Stadium, Swindon	Martin Goodwin	Andy Galvin	Ben Howe

== Semi-finals ==
- 22 April
- (England) Foxhall Stadium, Ipswich
- Top 8 to British final

Pos.	Rider	Points
1	David Norris	13+3
2	Chris Louis	13+2
3	Martin Dugard	13+1
4	Jeremy Doncaster	11
5	Richard Knight	11
6	Dave Mullett	9
7	Martin Goodwin	9
8	Les Collins	8
9	David Blackburn	7
10	Paul Thorp	6
11	Ben Howe	6
12	Eric Monaghan	5
13	Michael Coles (res)	5
14	Scott Lamb	3
15	Andrew Silver	1
16	Lawrence Hare (res)	1
17	Steve Schofield	0
18	Mark Loram	0

- 25 April
- (England) Dudley Wood Stadium, Dudley
- Top 8 to British final

Pos.	Rider	Points
1	Gary Havelock	14
2	Andy Smith	12
3	Andy Grahame	10
4	Troy Pratt	10
5	Peter Carr	9
6	Carl Stonehewer	9
7	Joe Screen	9
8	Sean Wilson	8+3
9	Graham Jones	8+2
10	Kelvin Tatum	7
11	Simon Cross	6
12	Andy Galvin	5
13	Simon Wigg	4
14	Ray Morton	4
15	Kenny McKinna	3
16	Neil Collins	1

== British Final ==
- 9 May 1993
- Top 10 riders qualify for the Commonwealth final as part of the 1993 World Championship
- (England) Brandon Stadium, Coventry

Pos.	Rider	Points	Details
Gold	Andy Smith	14	(3,3,2,3,3)
Silver	Joe Screen	13+3	(3,3,3,3,1)
Bronze	Gary Havelock	13+2	(3,3,3,1,3)
4	Richard Knight	11	(3,0,3,3,2)
5	Martin Dugard	11	(2,2,2,2,3)
6	Martin Goodwin	8	(2,2,3,1,0)
7	David Norris	8	(2,2,1,2,1)
8	Chris Louis	8	(1,1,2,2,2)
9	Dave Mullett	7	(1,X,0,3,3)
10	Les Collins	6	(0,1,1,2,2)
11	Troy Pratt	5	(1,1,1,1,1)
12	Carl Stonehewer	5	(1,3,1,0,0)
13	Jeremy Doncaster	4	(0,0,2,0,2)
14	Sean Wilson	4	(2,2,0,0,X)
15	Andy Grahame	2	(0,1,0,1,X)
16	Peter Carr	0	(0,X,0,X)
17	Chris Clarence (res)	0	(0)

== British Under 21 final ==
Joe Screen won the British Speedway Under 21 Championship for the second time. The final was held at Long Eaton Stadium on 21 April.

Pos.	Rider	Points
1	Joe Screen	14
2	Carl Stonehewer	12+3
3	David Norris	12+2
4	Ben Howe	12+1
5	Garry Stead	11
6	Colin White	11
7	Scott Smith	10
8	Shaun Tacey	7
9	Stephen Morris	7
10	Darren Pearson	6
11	Phil Morris	5
12	Paul Hurry	5
13	Glenn Cunningham	4
14	Chris Readshaw	3
15	Stuart Swales	1
16	Justin Elkins	0

== See also ==
- British Speedway Championship
- 1993 Individual Speedway World Championship
