= 1992 British Speedway Championship =

Seasons
- ← 1991 1993 →

The 1992 British Speedway Championship was the 32nd edition of the British Speedway Championship. The Final took place on 17 May at Brandon in Coventry, England. The Championship was won by Gary Havelock, who won a run-off against Martin Dugard after both finished on 13 points.

== First round ==
- Top 32 riders to British semi-finals

Date	Venue	Winner	2nd	3rd
11 April	Loomer Road Stadium, Chesterton	Dean Standing	Carl Blackbird	Nigel Crabtree
13 April	County Ground Stadium, Exeter	Andrew Silver	Alan Mogridge	Simon Cross
16 April	Cleveland Park Stadium, Middlesbrough	Paul Bentley	David Blackburn	Wayne Carter

== Semi-finals ==
- 3 May
- (England) Dudley Wood Stadium, Dudley
- Top 8 to British final

Pos.	Rider	Points
1	Gary Havelock	15
2	Martin Dugard	14
3	Sean Wilson	11
4	Andy Smith	10
5	Joe Screen	10
6	Graham Jones	10
7	Marvyn Cox	9
8	Kelvin Tatum	9
9	Alan Grahame	8
10	Daz Sumner	7
11	Troy Pratt	5
12	Martin Goodwin	5
13	Wayne Carter	3
14	Nigel Crabtree	3
15	David Blackbird	1
16	Simon Cross	0
17	Mark Robinson (res)	0
18	Mark Meredith (res)	0

- 3 May
- (England) Foxhall Stadium, Ipswich
- Top 8 to British final

Pos.	Rider	Points
1	Chris Louis	15
2	Mark Loram	12
3	Jeremy Doncaster	11
4	Dave Mullett	10
5	Paul Thorp	9
6	Dean Barker	9
7	Simon Wigg	8+3
8	Alun Rossiter	8+2
9	David Norris	8+1
10	David Blackburn	6
11	Richard Green	6
12	Dean Standing	6
13	Steve Schofield	5
14	Richard Knight	5
15	Paul Bentley	2
16	Andy Grahame	0
17	David Walsh (res)	0

== British Final ==
- 17 May 1992
- Top 10 riders qualify for the Commonwealth final as part of the 1992 World Championship
- (England) Brandon Stadium, Coventry

Pos.	Rider	Points	Details
Gold	Gary Havelock	13+3	(3,3,3,3,1)
Silver	Martin Dugard	13+2	(3,3,2,2,3)
Bronze	Andy Smith	11	(1,2,3,2,3)
4	Kelvin Tatum	10	(3,2,2,1,2,)
5	Paul Thorp	10	(0,1,3,3,3,)
6	Chris Louis	9	(2,3,1,3,0)
7	Marvyn Cox	9	(2,1,2,1,3)
8	Simon Wigg	7	(3,3,0,0,1)
9	Mark Loram	7	(0,2,1,2,2)
10	Dave Mullett	6	(1,0,3,T,2)
11	Dean Barker	6	(1,0,2,3,0)
12	Sean Wilson	5	(2,1,1,0,1)
13	Graham Jones	4	(0,2,0,F,2)
14	Jeremy Doncaster	4	(2,0,0,1,1)
15	Joe Screen	4	(1,0,1,2,0)
16	Alun Rossiter	1	(0,1,X)
17	Scott Wormleighton (res)	1	(1)
18	Chris Clarence (res)	0	(0,0)

== British Under 21 final ==
Scott Smith won the British Speedway Under 21 Championship. The final was held at Long Eaton Stadium on 22 April.

Pos.	Rider	Points
1	Scott Smith	14
2	Mark Loram	13
3	Joe Screen	12
4	Paul Dugard	10
5	Darren Pearson	9
6	Carl Stonehewer	9
7	Chris Readshaw	9
8	Garry Stead	9
9	Stephen Morris	8
10	Colin White	6
11	Glenn Cunningham	5
12	Scott Robson	5
13	Mark Simmons	3
14	Richard Musson	2
15	Paul Hurry	2
16	Jason Reed (res)	2
17	Duncan Chapman	1

== See also ==
- British Speedway Championship
- 1992 Individual Speedway World Championship
