= British Speedway Under 21 Championship =

Speedway Under 21 Championship

- Sport: Speedway
- Founded: 1969
- Country: Great Britain
- Most recent champion: Sam Hagon

The British Speedway Under-21 Championship (also known as the British Junior Speedway Championship) is an annual speedway competition open to riders of British nationality aged at least fifteen on the date of the first meeting, and under twenty-one on 1 January in the year of the competition. The winner of the final is declared British Under-21 Champion. Previous winners include former World Champions Mark Loram and Gary Havelock.

== Format ==
Sixteen riders plus three reserves take part in 20 heats with each rider facing each other once. The two riders which accumulate the highest number of points over the heats go straight to the final. The next four highest point scorers take part in a race-off, with first and second place riders also progressing to the final.

== Qualification ==
Seven riders are seeded straight to the final round while nine other riders qualify through three qualifying rounds held on a regional basis which use the same format as the final round. The first, second and third placed riders from each qualifier ride in the final round and fourth place riders take part as reserves. In the final round the reserves may take the rides of any incapacitated rider, replace any rider excluded for a starting infringement, or replace any rider excluded for exceeding the two minute time allowance except in the semi-final or final.

The top three riders go through to the British Speedway Championship final and the winner qualifies for the World Junior Championship semi-final round. The next five finishers qualify for the World Junior Championship qualifying rounds.

== British Under-21 Champions ==
Year	Winner	Runner-up	Third	Ref
1969	Graham Plant	Geoff Ambrose	Mick Bell	
1970	Barry Thomas	Dave Jessup	Mick Bell	
1971	Ian Turner	Dave Jessup	Peter Ingram	
1972	Allan Emmett	Gordon Kennett	Tony Davey	
1973	Peter Collins	Barney Kennett	David Gagen	
1974	Chris Morton	Steve Bastable	Neil Middleditch	
1975	Neil Middleditch	Steve Weatherley	Joe Owen	
1976	Michael Lee	Steve Weatherley	Colin Richardson	
1977	Les Collins	Phil Collins	Colin Richardson	
1978	Phil Collins	Ian Gledhill	Bob Garrad	
1979	Kenny Carter	Nigel Flatman	Melvyn Taylor	
1980	Mark Courtney	Kevin Smith	John Barker	
1981	Rob Lightfoot	Peter Carr	Neil Evitts	
1982	Peter Carr	Martin Hagon	Simon Cross	
1983	Keith Millard	Simon Cross	Kenny McKinna	
1984	Marvyn Cox	Simon Cross	Andy Smith	
1985	Carl Blackbird	Dave Mullett	Andy Smith	
1986	Gary Havelock	Andrew Silver	Darren Sumner	
1987	Darren Sumner	David Biles	Mark Loram	
1988	Mark Loram	Andy Phillips	Martin Dugard	
1989	Martin Dugard	Chris Louis	Dean Barker	
1990	Joe Screen	Mark Loram	Chris Louis	
Championship not held 1991
1992	Scott Smith	Joe Screen	Mark Loram	
1993	Joe Screen	Carl Stonehewer	David Norris	
1994	Paul Hurry	Ben Howe	James Grieves	
1995	Ben Howe	Paul Hurry	Savalas Clouting	
1996	Savalas Clouting	Scott Nicholls	Paul Hurry	
1997	Leigh Lanham	Lee Richardson	Scott Nicholls	
1998	Scott Nicholls	Lee Richardson	Paul Lee	
1999	Scott Nicholls	Lee Richardson	David Howe	
2000	David Howe	Lee Richardson	Paul Lee	
2001	Simon Stead	David Howe	Paul Lee	
2002	Simon Stead	Ross Brady	Oliver Allen	
2003	Simon Stead	Oliver Allen	Edward Kennett	
2004	Ritchie Hawkins	Steve Boxall	Edward Kennett	
2005	Edward Kennett	Chris Schramm	Richard Hall	
2006	Ben Wilson	Daniel King	Lewis Bridger	
2007	Edward Kennett	William Lawson	Tai Woffinden	
2008	Tai Woffinden	Adam Roynon	Ben Barker	
2009	Lewis Bridger	Tai Woffinden	Joe Haines	
2010	Joe Haines	Tai Woffinden	Lewis Bridger	
2011	Tai Woffinden	Steven Worrall	Joe Haines	
2012	Joe Haines	Tom Perry	Kyle Howarth	
2013	Robert Branford	Kyle Howarth	Jason Garrity	
2014	Josh Bates	Adam Ellis	Jason Garrity	
2015	Kyle Howarth	Robert Lambert	Stefan Nielsen	
2016	Josh Bates	Robert Lambert	Adam Ellis	
2017	Robert Lambert	Adam Ellis	Josh Bates	
2018	Robert Lambert	Connor Mountain	Nathan Greaves	
2019	Robert Lambert	Zach Wajtknecht	Jack Thomas	
2020	Dan Bewley	Leon Flint	Anders Rowe	
2021	Tom Brennan	Drew Kemp	Dan Gilkes	
2022	Leon Flint	Dan Thompson	Connor Bailey ( (Australia) )	
2023	Connor Bailey ( (Australia) )	Anders Rowe	Dan Thompson	
2024	Sam Hagon	Leon Flint	Ashton Boughen	
2025	Sam Hagon	Joe Thompson	Luke Harrison	
2026	Cooper Rushen	Jody Scott	Ace Pijper	

== See also ==
- British Speedway Championship
- British Speedway Under 18 Championship
- Speedway in the United Kingdom
