= Emil Lindqvist =

Swedish speedway rider

- Born: 8 December 1976 (age 49); Stockholm, Sweden
- Nationality: Swedish

Career history

Sweden
- 1994–2000: Rospiggarna
- 2001–2002: Vargarna
- 2002: Bysarna
- 2003: Korparna

Great Britain
- 1999, 2001–2002: Newport Wasps
- 2000: Poole Pirates

Individual honours
- 1996: Swedish U21 champion

Team honours
- 1995, 1997: Elitserien Champion
- 1994: Allsvenskan Div 1 Champion

Emil Lindqvist (born 8 December 1976) is a Swedish former motorcycle speedway rider.

== Career ==
Lindqvist came to prominence when he won the gold medal at the 1996 Swedish Junior Speedway Championship. The following year, he reached the final of the 1997 Speedway Under-21 World Championship.

Lindqvist started racing in the British leagues during the 1999 Premier League speedway season, when riding for the Newport Wasps and averaged 8.86.

Lindqvist rode in Sweden for Rospiggarna, Vargarna and Korparna.
