= Anders Henriksson (speedway rider) =

Swedish speedway rider

- Born: 6 October 1975 (age 51); Bor, Sweden
- Nationality: Swedish

Career history

Sweden
- 1993–1995: Njudungarna
- 1994–1997: Vetlanda
- 1998–1999: Vargarna
- 2000: Kaparna
- 2000–2003: Lejonen
- 2001: Västervik

Great Britain
- 1997–2001: Newport Wasps
- 2002: Reading Racers

Individual honours
- 1995, 1996: Swedish U21 bronze

Team honours
- 1994, 1995: Swedish Div 2B Champion
- 2000: Swedish Division One Champion

Anders Terje Elias Henriksson (born 6 October 1975) is a former motorcycle speedway rider from Sweden.

== Career ==
Henriksson started riding in Sweden in 1993 for Njudungarna. He came to prominence when he won consecutive bronze medals at the 1995 and 1996 Swedish Junior Speedway Championship. He started racing in the British leagues during the 1997 Premier League speedway season, when riding for the Newport Wasps, averaging a strong 8.24.

Henriksson continued to ride for Newport and recorded a 9.02 average in 1999. After five years at Newport, he joined the Reading Racers in 2002, for his final season in British speedway.

== Family ==
Henriksson's father Terje earned three caps for the Sweden national speedway team in the 1960s.
