= Andre Compton =

British speedway rider

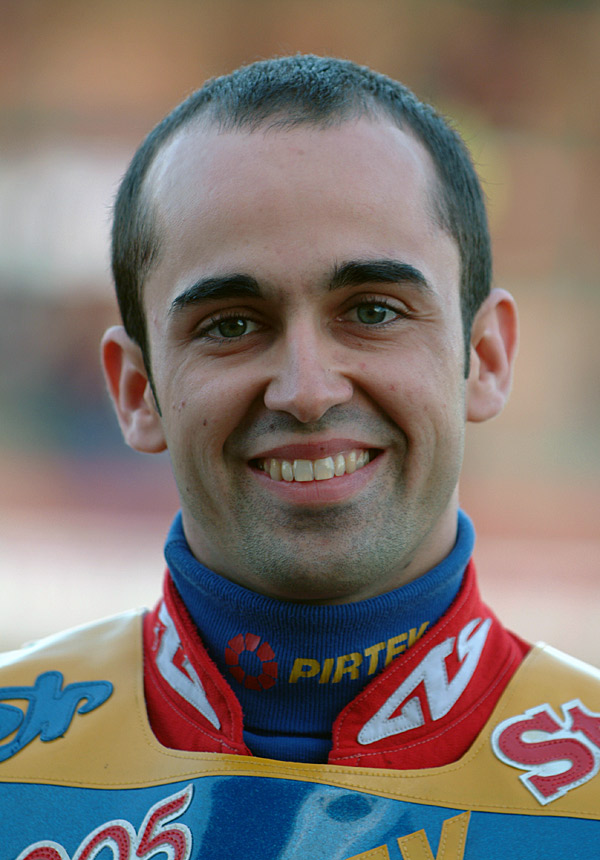
- Born: 15 May 1977 (age 49); Dewsbury, England
- Nationality: British (English)

Career history

Great Britain
- 1993, 1997, 2000–2002: Newcastle Diamonds
- 1993, 1996: Bradford Dukes
- 1995: Hull Vikings
- 1996, 2004: Belle Vue Aces
- 1997: Berwick Bandits
- 1998–1999, 2003–2008, 2013–2015: Sheffield Tigers
- 2000: Peterborough Panthers
- 2002–2004: Poole Pirates
- 2009–2010: Workington Comets
- 2013: Glasgow Tigers

Sweden
- 2007: Smederna

Individual honours
- 2001: Scottish Open Champion
- 2004: Premier League Riders Champion

Team honours
- 1999, 2009: Premier League Fours Winner
- 1999, 2001: Premier League Champions
- 2009: Young Shield Winner

Andre Neil Compton (born 15 May 1977 in Dewsbury, England) is a former speedway rider from England. He is the older brother of Benji Compton.

== Career summary ==
In 1999, Compton was part of the Sheffield four that won the Premier League Four-Team Championship, which was held on 29 August 1999, at the East of England Arena.

In 2004, Compton's form led to a call-up from Elite League side Poole Pirates. This was also the year in which Compton became Premier League Riders Champion, held on 19 September at Owlerton Stadium. He passed the unbeaten Simon Stead in the final, and both riders fell on the last turn, giving both riders multiple injuries. The race was awarded and Compton managed to take his place on the rostrum as winner.

In 2006, Compton became the captain of the Sheffield Tigers following the retirement of Sean Wilson. It was a successful season for the Tigers who finished second in the Premier League and gained a place in the Premier League play-off final, which was won by the King's Lynn Stars. Compton tore ligaments in his shoulder while riding in Sweden in August, just before the Premier Trophy Final, which they consequently lost to King's Lynn Stars.

Compton recovered in time to compete in the Premier League Riders' Championship in September, but fell heavily while in the tournament in his fourth heat. He soon returned to action but was unable to prevent his team from losing the play-off final to King's Lynn and once again becoming runners up in the Premier League.

In 2007 and 2008, Compton remained with the Sheffield Tigers. At the end of the 2008 season, Compton announced his retirement from the sport to pursue other business matters, stating that he had lost his passion for speedway. A subsequent change of heart saw him return to the Premier League, moving to the Workington Comets after six consecutive seasons with Sheffield Tigers. He was part of the Workington four who won the Premier League Four-Team Championship, held on 25 July 2009, at Derwent Park.

On 16 June 2013, it was announced at the Red revolution open at Glasgow that Compton had signed a contract to ride for the Glasgow Tigers for the rest of the season.

After the 2015 season with Sheffield, Compton retired permanently.
