= Peter Carr (speedway rider) =

English speedway rider

- Born: 22 January 1963 (age 63); Preston, England
- Nationality: British (English)

Career history
- 1979–1981: Ellesmere Port Gunners
- 1980–1984, 1994–1995: Belle Vue Aces
- 1985–1988, 1991–1993: Sheffield Tigers
- 1989–1990: Newcastle Diamonds
- 1997–2004: Edinburgh Monarchs
- 2005: Stoke Potters

Individual honours
- 1987, 1993: British Championship finalist
- 1982: British Under 21 Champion
- 1983: World Under 21 finalist
- 1986: Northern Riders' Champion
- 1997: Premier League Riders' champion

Team honours
- 1982: British League
- 1983: British League Cup Winner
- 1997, 1999: Knockout Cup
- 2003: Premier League

Peter Carr (born 22 January 1963) is a former international motorcycle speedway rider from England.

== Speedway career ==
In 1979, Carr joined his older brother Louis Carr at Ellesmere Port Gunners, for the 1979 National League season. He progressively increased his average in 1980 and 1981 before joining Belle Vue Aces for the 1982 British League season, again following his brother.

While at Belle Vue, Carr won the 1982 league title and the British Speedway Under 21 Championship, the 1983 League Cup and was a World Under 21 finalist. For the 1985 season, he moved to Sheffield Tigers, where he spent fours seasons.

Carr rode in his first final of the British Speedway Championship 1987. From 1989 to 1990, he rode for Newcastle Diamonds. He returned to ride for two previous clubs, Sheffield (from 1991 to 1993) and Belle Vue from 1994 to 1995. At Sheffield, he twice surpassed a nine average.

In 1997, Carr won the Premier League Riders Championship, held on 13 September at Brandon Stadium as an Edinburgh Monarchs rider, in addition to helping the Scottish club win the Knockout Cup. During his eight years at Edinburgh, success came again in the form of another Knockout Cup in 1999 and the league title during the 2003 Premier League speedway season.

At retirement, Carr had earned 12 international caps for the England national speedway team.

== Family ==
Carr's brother Louis was also a speedway rider.
