= Paul Lee (speedway rider) =

- Born: 21 March 1981; Nottingham, England
- Nationality: British (English)

Career history
- 1997: Long Eaton Invaders
- 1998: Hull Vikings
- 1999, 2004–2005, 2007: Kings Lynn Stars
- 1999–2000: Sheffield Tigers
- 2001: Coventry Bees
- 2002: Swindon Robins
- 2005: Peterborough Panthers
- 2008: Mildenhall Fen Tigers

Team honours
- 1997, 1999: Premier League Four-Team Championship

Paul Kevin Lee (born 21 March 1981, in Nottingham, England) is a former motorcycle speedway rider from England.

== Career ==
Lee began riding in 1996 at the age of 15.

Lee began his league career with Long Eaton Invaders in 1997. He was part of the Long Eaton four that won the Premier League Four-Team Championship, which was held on 3 August 1997, at the East of England Arena. In the final he came in as reserve and was joint top scorer for the Invaders.

In 1999, Lee was part of the Sheffield Tigers four that won the Premier League Four-Team Championship, which was held on 29 August 1999, at the East of England Arena.

Lee's final season in 2008, was riding for the Mildenhall Fen Tigers after spending 2007 with the King's Lynn Stars.

== Honours ==
- Premier League Championship medal winner 1999
- Premier League Four Team Tournament medal winner 1997, 1999 & 2000
- Premier League Premiership medal winner 1999
- Premier League winner 2007
- Conference League Championship medal winner 2003
- England Under 21 Captain during tour of Australia 2001.
