= Leigh Lanham =

British speedway rider (born 1977)

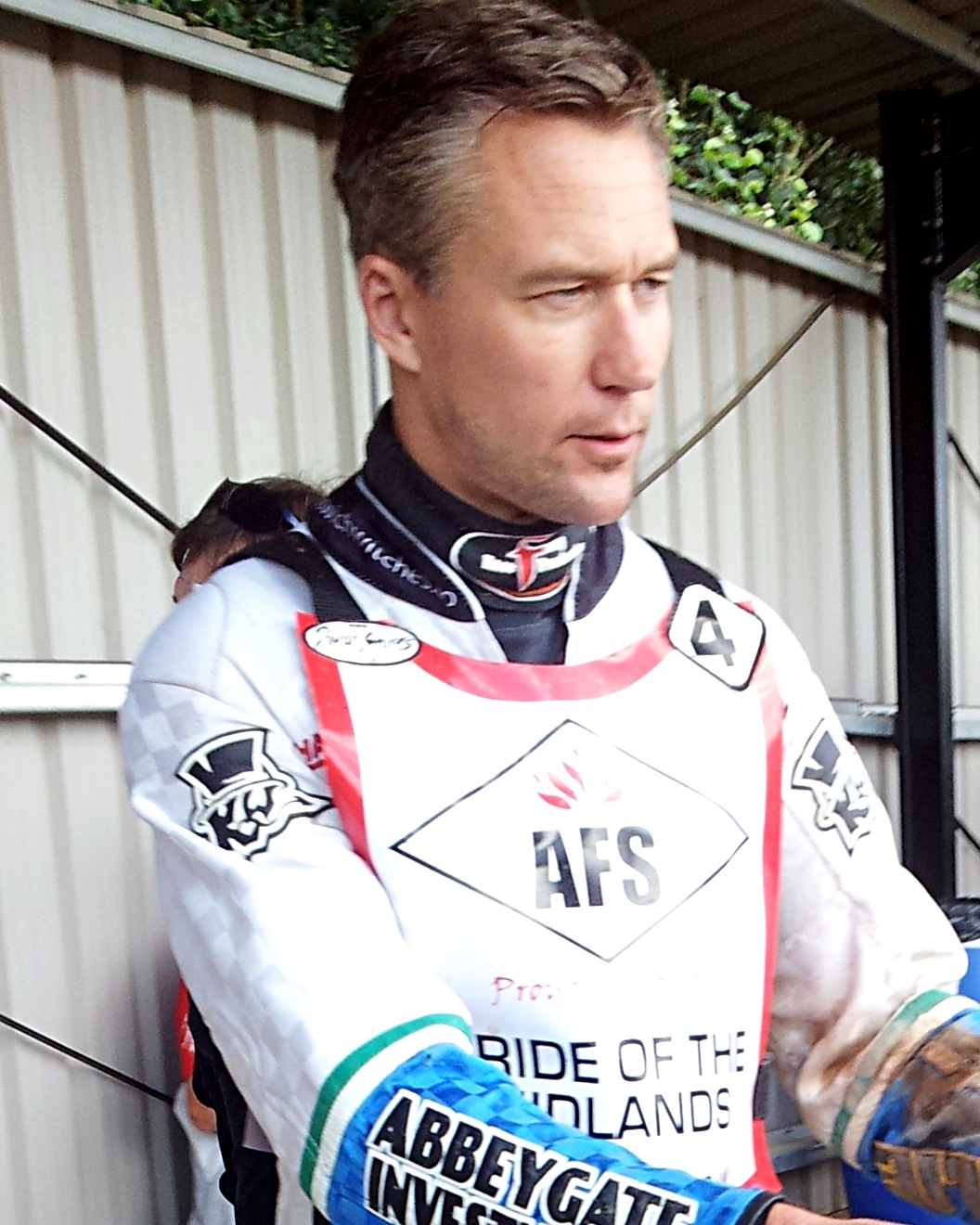
- Born: 15 August 1977 (age 49); Ipswich, England
- Nationality: British (English)

Career history

Great Britain
- 1993-1997, 2002-2003, 2009, 2012-2013: Ipswich Witches
- 1997: Exeter Falcons
- 1997: Bradford Dukes
- 1997: King's Lynn Stars
- 1998-2006: Arena Essex Hammers
- 2007-2008: Lakeside Hammers
- 2010: Belle Vue Aces
- 2010-2011: Newport Wasps
- 2012: Coventry Bees
- 2014: Sheffield Tigers
- 2015: Somerset Rebels and Scunthorpe Scorpions
- 2016: Rye House Rockets

Sweden
- 1999: Filbyterna
- 2001: Piraterna

Individual honours
- 1997: British Under 21 Champion

Leigh Stefan Lanham (born 15 August 1977 in Ipswich, Suffolk) is an English former motorcycle speedway rider.

== Career ==
Son of former rider Mike, Lanham joined Ipswich Witches in 1994 and won the British Under 21 Championship in 1997. He reached the World Under 21 Final in 1996 and 1998 and has finished in the top six of the British Speedway Championship.

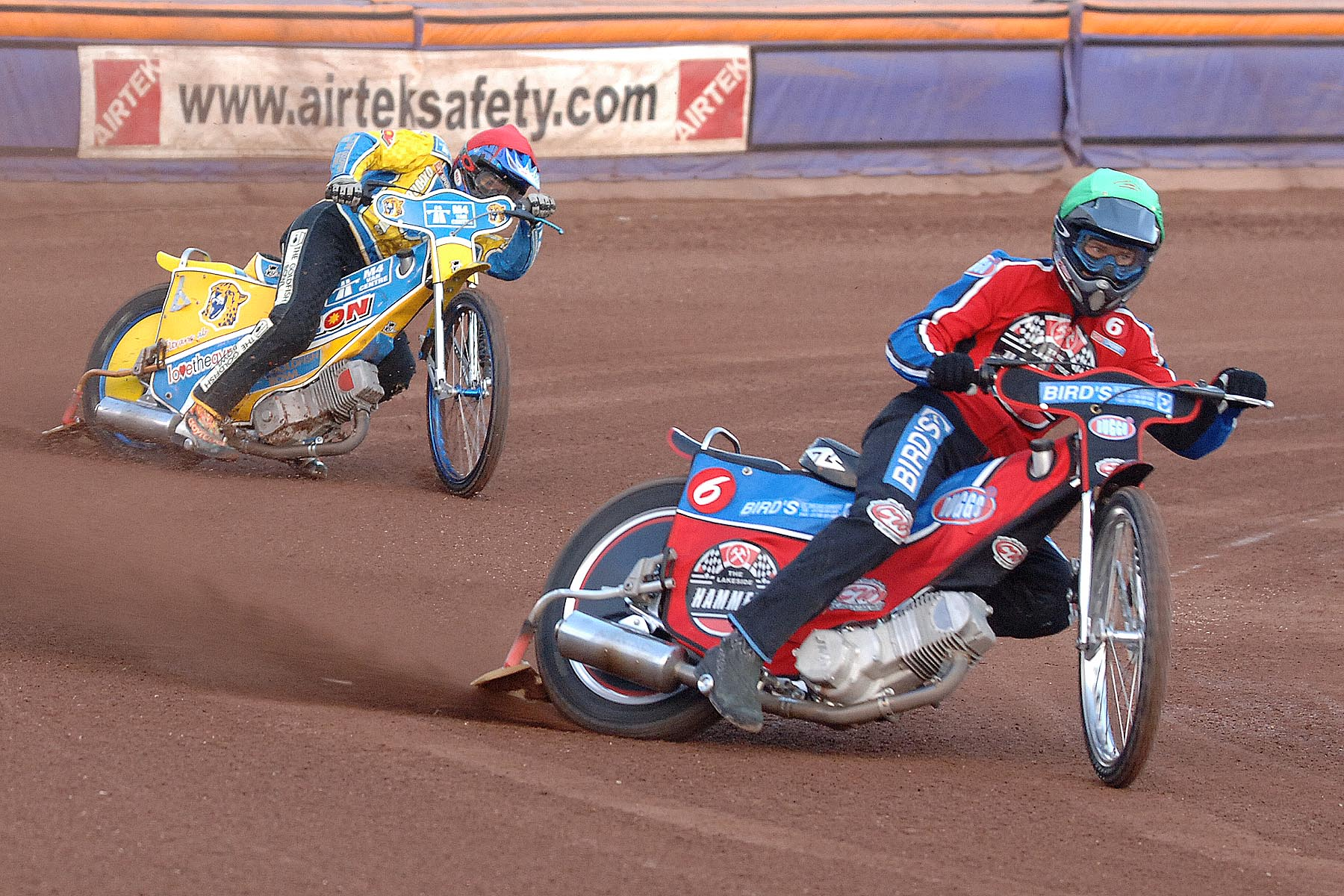
Lanham riding for Lakeside in 2007

In December 2011, Lanham signed to ride for Coventry Bees in the Elite League as a double-up rider, sharing a team place with Aaron Summers. Following the closure of the Premier League Newport Wasps team, Lanham rode for the Rye House Rockets for a short period, before re-joining his home town club Ipswich Witches, following an injury to Morten Risager. Leigh retired from speedway in January 2017 at the age of 39.

On 14 September 2018, Lanham was chosen to ride the final four laps at the Arena Essex raceway. During his ten years with the Arena Essex Hammers and Lakeside Hammers, Lanham became the club's all-time leading appearance maker and highest points scorer.
