= Speedway Control Bureau =

UK sports governing body

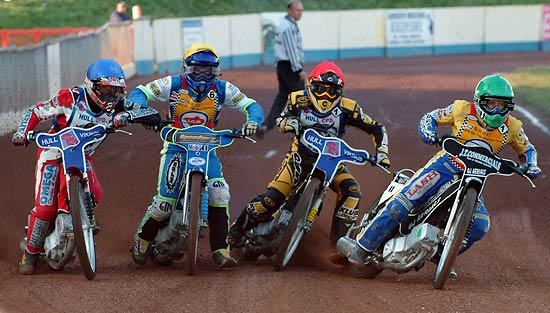
Motorcycle speedway

The Speedway Control Bureau (SCB), known as the Speedway Control Board between 1948 and 2002, governs the sport of motorcycle speedway in the United Kingdom on behalf of the Auto Cycle Union (ACU). The directors are appointed by the ACU and British Speedway Promoters' Limited (BSPL). The SCB has the sole authority to initiate and enforce regulations; however, it usually acts on the recommendation of the BSPL.

== See also ==
- Elite League
- Premier League
- National League
- British League
- British League Division Two
- Conference League
- British Speedway Championship
- Speedway in the United Kingdom
