= Alun Rossiter =

British motorcycle speedway rider

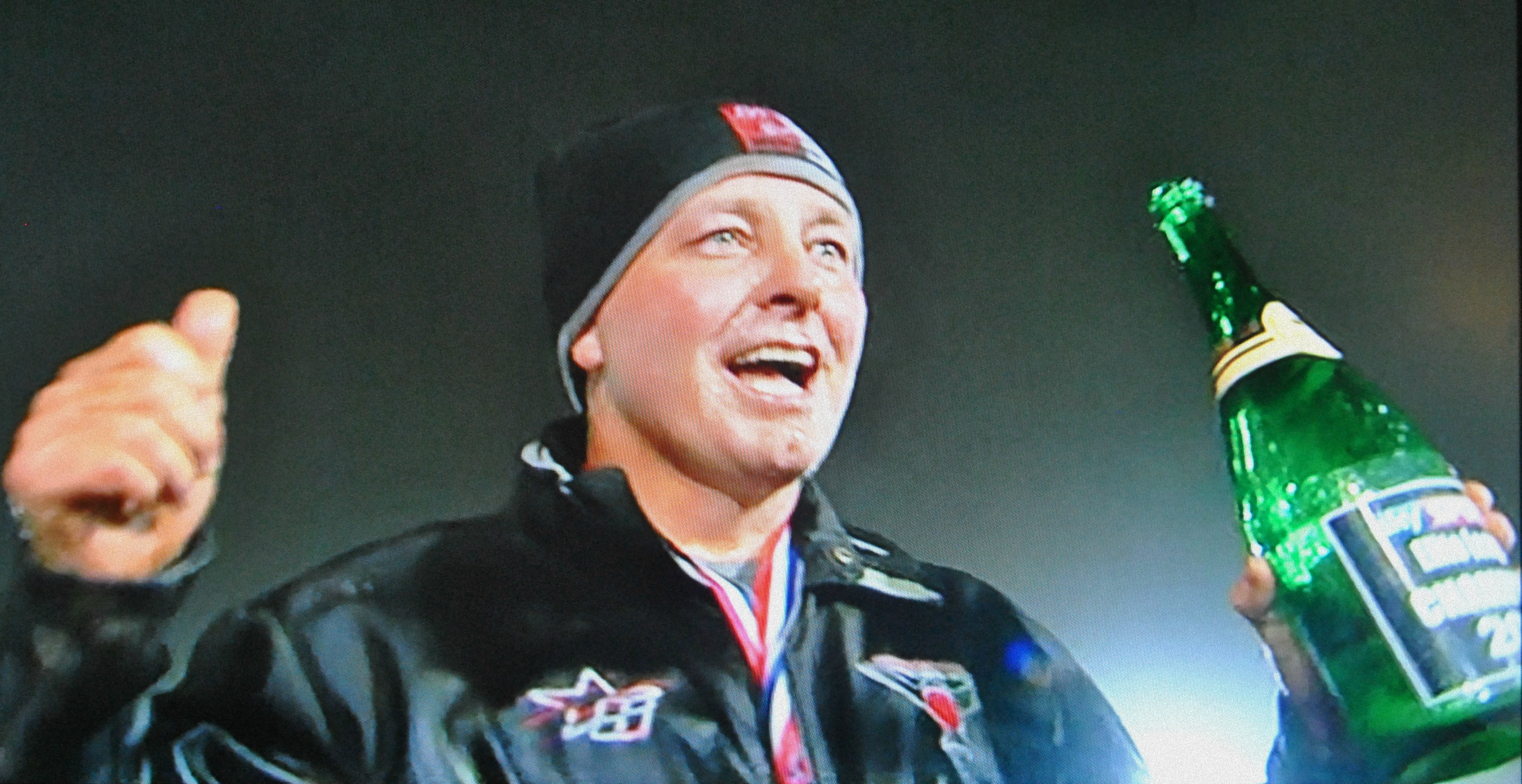
- Alun Rossiter, 2012
- Born: 23 July 1965 (age 61); Swindon, England
- Nickname: Rosco
- Nationality: British (English)

Career history
- 1982–1983, 1996: Exeter Falcons
- 1982–1985, 1987–1988, 1993, 1997–1998, 2001: Swindon Robins
- 1984: Weymouth Wildcats
- 1986: Coventry Bees
- 1989–1992, 1994–1995, 2000: Poole Pirates
- 1992: King's Lynn Stars
- 1996: Peterborough Panthers
- 1999, 2002: Oxford Cheetahs
- 2000–2001: Wolverhampton Wolves
- 2002: Trelawny Tigers

Team honours
- 1994: British League (tier 1)
- 1994: Fours championship (tier 1)
- 1989, 1990: National League (tier 2)
- 1983, 1990: National League KO Cup

Alun John Rossiter (born 23 July 1965, in Swindon, England) is a former motorcycle speedway rider and team manager. He earned eight international caps for the England national speedway team and was the Great Britain team manager from 2014 to 2019.

== Riding career ==
Rossiter began his British leagues career, riding a couple of times for Exeter Falcons on loan from Swindon Robins during the 1982 National League season, in addition to racing for Swindon in some junior fixtures.

Rossiter improved significantly in 1983 for Exeter and secured a switch to Weymouth Wildcats for the 1984 season, which was also his breakthrough year with Swindon in the top division. He was a regular British League rider afterwards and spent the 1985 season with Swindon and the 1986 season with Coventry Bees before returning to Swindon in 1987.

In 1989, Rossiter returned to the National League after joining the Poole Pirates and was part of the team that won the League title in 1989 and 1990 and the Knockout Cup in 1990. He also won the British league title and Fours championship with Poole in 1994.

Rossiter later raced for a number of clubs including Peterborough, Oxford and Wolverhampton and retired from racing after sustaining a serious knee injury during a crash in 2002.

== Management career ==
In 2003, Terry Russell bought the promoting rights for the Robins, and soon after Rossiter was installed as co-promoter and team manager. He was team manager of Coventry, when they won the 2010 league title and Swindon when they won the 2012 and 2017 league titles.

From 2014 to 2019, Rossiter was the team manager of Great Britain.
