= British Speedway Promoters' Association =

British motorsports organizer

The British Speedway Promoters Limited (BSPL) organises the domestic motorcycle speedway competitions in the United Kingdom. They are also responsible for the promotion and running of the FIM meetings staged in Britain. Wimbledon controller Ronnie Green was the first chairman of the organization.

Each club has a promoter in the association, although promotions under three years of membership do not have a vote. A Management Committee is elected at the Annual General Meeting, and this committee is responsible for the day-to-day running of British speedway.

All the promoters meet periodically to discuss matters of importance, usually rule changes.

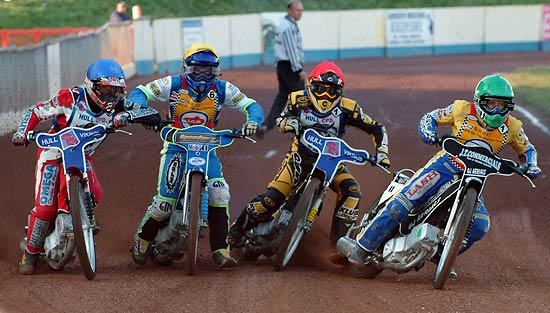
Motorcycle speedway

== See also ==
- Motorcycle speedway
- The Speedway Control Bureau
- Elite League
- Premier League
- Conference League
- British Speedway Championship
- Speedway in the United Kingdom
