= Garry Stead =

British speedway rider

- Born: 5 January 1972 (age 54); Holmfirth, England
- Nickname: Steady or Gazza
- Nationality: British (English)

Career history
- 1988: Cradley Heath Heathens
- 1989-1992, 2007: Stoke Potters
- 1993-1994: Newcastle Diamonds
- 1995, 1997: Bradford Dukes
- 1996: Sheffield Tigers
- 1998: Wolverhampton Wolves
- 1999-2005: Hull Vikings
- 2006: Workington Comets

Team honours
- 1997: Elite League Champion
- 2004: Premier League Champion
- 2006: Premier League Fours Champion
- 2001, 2004: Premier League KO Cup Winner
- 2000: Premier Trophy Winner
- 2004: Young Shield Winner

Garry Stead (born 5 January 1972 in Holmfirth, England) is a former international motorcycle speedway rider.

== Career ==
=== Cradley Heath and Stoke ===
Stead showed a real interest in speedway, being a regular supporter at the Shay watching the Halifax Dukes and became a schoolboy Grasstrack rider, winning the British Championship in his age category numerous times. His speedway career started at a Bradford Dukes training school in 1987, followed by after meeting rides. His first club was the Cradley Heath Heathens in 1988, where he was a junior before he moved to the Stoke Potters in 1989. He continued to ride in after the meeting races but during this season he broke his elbow. It was at Stoke that Stead had the opportunity to battle for a team place towards the end of 1990. He became a regular in 1991 and stayed there until 1992.

=== Newcastle ===
Stead moved to Brough Park in 1993 to be part of the Newcastle Diamonds outfit, scoring well but did not manage to get through the season unscathed as he ended up with a broken wrist and thumb. It was during his time at Newcastle that Bradford promoter Alan Ham became aware of Garry's potential, he moved quickly to secure his services in the 1994 season and paid £15,000 for him but loaned him back to Newcastle for the rest of the season.

=== Bradford and Sheffield ===
In 1995, Stead became a full Bradford Dukes rider, cementing his place in the main body of the team and picking up a winner's medal for the KO Cup. He also qualified for his first British Final, in 1995, progressing to the Overseas Final. The season came to and end after he broke an ankle.

During 1996, Bradford signed Australian Todd Wiltshire, which resulted in Stead being loaned to Sheffield Tigers. During the season, he progressed to heat leader status with Tigers. The following year Alan and Bobby Ham brought him back to the Dukes. In 1997, he was part of the Elite League Championship winning team. Stead joined the Wolverhampton Wolves following the demise of Bradford in 1998. He made a third British final appearance in the 1998 British Speedway Championship.

=== Hull ===
Garry Stead - at his best riding for the Hull Vikings 2005

In 1999, Stead joined Hull Vikings and stayed until 2005. During his time with the Vikings he won the Premier Trophy in 2000 and the KO Cup in 2001. In 2002, he participated in his fourth British Final.

During the 2003 Elite League speedway season, Stead guested for Poole Pirates in the KO Cup final, teaming up with Tony Rickardsson for a 5-1 which helped Poole win the final. His most successful season however was in 2004, when Hull won the treble of Premier League, the Knockout Cup and the Young Shield.

=== Workington and back to Stoke ===
In 2006, Stead was signed by the Workington Comets where was made team captain and had a good season averaging 8.47. He also reached the British Final at Belle Vue for the fifth time in his career. He led the Comets to the Premier League Fours Championship, held on 7 October 2006, at Derwent Park. Promoter Dave Tattum came in at the end of the 2006 season to sign Stead on loan for the Stoke Potters. He started the season off well, top scoring in most of the meetings and he was made captain.

== Accident ==
On Friday 18 May 2007, Stead's racing career came to an abrupt end at Somerset, when a racing accident left him paralysed from the waist down.
