= Dean Barker (speedway rider) =

British speedway rider

- Born: 2 August 1970; Isleworth, Middlesex, England
- Nationality: British (English)

Career history

Great Britain
- 1986–1989, 1993–1995, 1997, 1999–2003, 2005–2007: Eastbourne Eagles
- 1987–1988: Cradley Heathens
- 1990–1992: Oxford Cheetahs
- 2004: Arena Essex Hammers

Sweden
- 1997–2004: Team Svelux/Luxo Stars

Team honours
- 1995, 2000: PL/EL (tier 1)
- 1994, 1997, 2002: BL/EL KO Cup (tier 1)
- 1986, 1987: National League Champion
- 1986, 1987: National League Knockout Cup Winner

Dean Barker (born 2 August 1970) is a former British international motorcycle speedway rider who competed at the sports highest level until his retirement in 2007. He earned 14 caps for the England national speedway team and 4 caps for the Great Britain national speedway team.

== Speedway career ==
Barker first rode for Eastbourne Eagles during the 1986 National League season, and although he only appeared in 14 matches that season, he contributed to a league and cup double winning season for the south coast club. The following season in 1987, Barker and Eastbourne repeated the success to record the 'double double'.

Barker was one of Eastbourne's leading riders by the time Oxford Cheetahs came in to sign him for the 1990 British League season, where he would ride alongside Hans Nielsen. In 1993 and 1994, he returned to Eastbourne and was an integral part of the Eagles team that won the 1994 Knockout Cup and 1995 Premier League.

Barker won another Knockout Cup in 1997 but suffered serious injuries that forced him to miss two entire seasons in 1996 with a broken leg and 1998 with a broken arm. However, after making a successful comeback in 1999 he won the Elite League in 2000 and the Knockout Cup in 2002.

Barker's farewell meeting in 2009 celebrated a career which included highlights of becoming Eastbourne Eagles captain and racing to podiums in major competitions such as the British Under 21 Championship and the British Championship.
