= Phil Morris (speedway rider) =

Retired British motorcycle speedway rider

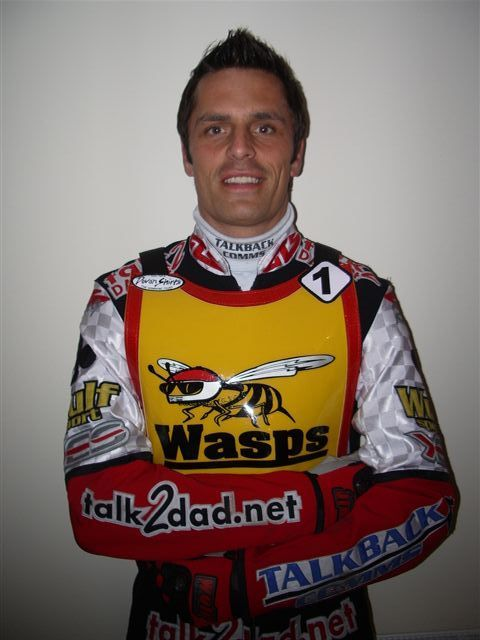
- Born: 10 September 1975 (age 51); Newport, Wales
- Nationality: British (Welsh)

Career history

Great Britain
- 1991–1996, 1998–2004,: Reading Racers
- 1997, 2009: Stoke Potters
- 2004: Poole Pirates
- 2005: Newcastle Diamonds
- 2005: Arena Essex Hammers
- 2006: Belle Vue Aces
- 2007: Newport Wasps
- 2007–2008: Birmingham Brummies
- 2009: Lakeside Hammers

Sweden
- 2001: Getingarna
- 2002: Norspeed
- 2004: Lejonen

Team honours
- 1992, 2004: Elite League Champion
- 1993: Elite League Fours Champion
- 1992: Inter League Cup Winner
- 1998: Premier League KO Cup Winner
- 2004: Premier League Pairs Champion

Phillip William Morris (born 10 September 1975 in Newport, Wales) is a retired British motorcycle speedway rider. He was the former Team GB Under 21 team manager. He was also the team manager of the Birmingham Brummies for two seasons.

== Speedway career ==
=== Early years ===
Morris was the Welsh Schoolboy grasstrack champion at the age of nine and within two years was also the British Youth Grasstrack Champion, a title he won a total of five times. He was signed by the Reading Racers a few days before his 16th Birthday.

=== Reading Racers ===
Plunged straight into first team action at the end of the 1991 season, Morris was then named in the Racers starting line up in one of the reserve positions for the 1992 season. He was part of the team that won the 1992 British League season title that season and rode for Reading over the next five seasons.

Morris spent 1997 on loan to Stoke Potters, before re-joining his parent club for the 1998 season. In 1999, Morris improved his average to 7.49 in the Premier League and continued this form into the 2000 season by averaging over 8. He won New Year Classic on 2 January 2000 at Newport Speedway. The 2000 season was Morris' tenth on the books of Reading Speedway and he was granted a testimonial meeting, which attracted over 3,000 people to Reading's Smallmead Stadium.

In 2001 and 2002, Morris continued to perform well in the Premier League averaging 8.42 and 8.68 respectively, and he came third in the 2002 Premier League Riders' Championship at Belle Vue. A knee injury suffered in Sweden curtailed his 2003 season, but he was back in the saddle for 2004, and proved his fitness with a 12-point maximum in his first meeting back against King's Lynn Stars. Although 2004 was to be his last full-time campaign in Reading colours, he also achieved one of his finest moments in the sport, when he partnered Danny Bird to win the Premier League Riders Pairs Championship.

=== Life after Reading ===
For the 2005 season, Morris signed with the Newcastle Diamonds. Niggling injuries meant Morris did not quite live up to expectations. In 2006, he was signed by Elite League Belle Vue Aces, where his long-time friend and multi-world champion Jason Crump was team captain. Morris finished the season with a 4.26 point average.

For the 2007 season, Morris received the offer to ride for his home town club Newport, some ten years after they had pulled the plug on his contract. Although Morris was their highest scorer in most meetings, the team struggled badly and crowds dwindled, which led to the club cutting costs and Morris agreeing to move on and join fellow Premier League side Birmingham.

=== Birmingham Brummies ===
Morris was signed on a full transfer by the Birmingham Brummies in 2008 but suffered serious internal injuries in a crash at Mildenhall in early April and on his return to action in late May he suffered another injury, a badly dislocated shoulder at Rye House.

=== Final years ===
Morris' injury problems were to have a lasting effect on the Welshman, and, although he returned to the saddle in 2009, signing to ride for the Stoke Potters in the Premier League and starting the season well with some good performances, problems with his shoulder meant his scoring slumped and he was axed from the side, going on to ride for the Workington Comets, where again he struggled for points. He also doubled up with the Lakeside Hammers in the Elite League, where he produced a number of good performances. However, he took a heavy fall at Workington in August, and once again the shoulder was badly dislocated. On the advice of medics he took the decision to retire from speedway to avoid permanent damage to the shoulder. Morris announced his retirement from competitive Speedway at the age of 34 in September 2009. Two years later, in September 2011, Morris staged his farewell meeting at Birmingham Speedway.

=== Management ===
Morris was appointed as head coach of the 2010 Great Britain under 21 team. This proved so successful that he was tasked with responsibility for the management, development and co-ordination of activities with regards to the riders aged 21 and below in British Speedway a role he continued in for the next four seasons.

In 2012, he was appointed Assistant Team Manager for the Senior Squad as well, a role he undertook for 2013 Speedway World Cup as well. Morris also successfully lead Team GB to a series victory over Australia in a series of meetings held on Premier League tracks.

In 2012, Morris returned to the Birmingham Brummies to manage the team, alongside the incumbent manager and promoter Graham Drury. In their first year as joint team managers they led the Brummies to the Elite League play-off's, for the first time since the club's reformation in 2006. For the 2013 season Morris took over the full team management duties, where he led the Brummies to the league's top slot at the end of the season, only to see them lose to Poole Pirates in the grand final. Morris resigned from his position at the end of the campaign, revealing unrest behind the scenes as his main reasons.

After playing a key role in the development of the newly formed Elite League Rider draft system, which saw young British riders fast tracked into the 2014 Elite League teams, Morris decided to tender his resignation from the role of under 21 coach at the end of the season. In December 2014, he was named the new FIM Race Director for the Speedway Grand Prix World Championship series as well as the Speedway World Cup, following the retirement of Tony Olsson.

=== Game show appearances ===
Morris has appeared on a number of UK television game shows including The Weakest Link, Brainbox Challenge, Eggheads.
