= Savalas Clouting =

English speedway rider

- Born: 8 September 1975 (age 51); Ipswich, England
- Nationality: British (English)

Career history
- 1992–1996, 1998–2001: Ipswich Witches
- 1997, 2000: Poole Pirates
- 2000: Arena Essex Hammers
- 2000, 2002: Eastbourne Eagles

Individual honours
- 1998: British Championship finalist
- 1996: British Junior Champion

Savalas Jose Fransisco Clouting (born 8 September 1975) is an English former speedway rider.

== Speedway career ==
Clouting reached the final of the British Speedway Championship in 1998. He rode in the top tier of British Speedway from 1992–2002, riding for various clubs. He ended his career at Eastbourne Eagles after the 2002 season.

In addition to reaching the British Final, Clouting was crowned British Junior Champion in 1996 and reached the final of the Individual Speedway Junior World Championship in 1995.

In 2024, Clouting was part of a team that undertook a marathon charity cycling ride for the Speedway Riders Benevolent Fund.

== Family ==
Clouting's son Jacob is a speedway rider.
