= Ben Howe (speedway rider) =

English speedway rider

- Born: 6 December 1974 (age 51); Crawley, West Sussex, England
- Nationality: British (English)

Career history
- 1991–1997, 1999, 2003: Ipswich Witches
- 1997: Poole Pirates
- 1998: King's Lynn Stars
- 1999: Hull Vikings
- 2000, 2002: Newport Wasps

Individual honours
- 1994, 1995, 1996: British Championship finalist
- 1995: British Under 21 Champion
- 1995: World Under 21 finalist

Benjamin George Howe (born 6 December 1974) is a former motorcycle speedway rider from England. He earned eight international caps for the England national speedway team.

== Speedway career ==
Howe reached the final of the British Speedway Championship on three occasions in 1994, 1995 and 1996. He was also the British Under 21 Champion and a World Under 21 finalist.

Howe rode in the top tier of British Speedway from 1991 to 2003, riding for various clubs. He started his career with Ipswich Witches during the 1991 British League season and spent seven years with the club and peaking with a 7.42 average in 1996. He sustained injuries in a track crash in October 1996.

Howe also rode grasstrack and won the South East Championship in 1993.
