= David Walsh (speedway rider) =

English speedway rider

- Born: 29 August 1963 (age 63); Sowerby Bridge, West Yorkshire, England
- Nationality: British (English)

Career history
- 1983, 1993–1995: Glasgow Tigers
- 1983–1986: Sheffield Tigers
- 1983, 1999: Newcastle Diamonds
- 1984, 1989–1992, 1998: Berwick Bandits
- 1985: Ellesmere Port Gunners
- 1987, 1988: Cradley Heathens
- 1996: Middlesbrough Bears
- 1997: Bradford Dukes
- 1998: Coventry Bees
- 2000: Stoke Potters
- 2001: Hull Vikings

Individual honours
- 1995, 1996, 1997: British Championship finalist

Team honours
- 1985: National League Champion
- 1987, 1988: British League KO Cup Winner
- 1987: Midland Cup Winner

David Michael Walsh (born 29 August 1963) is a former international speedway rider from England.

== Speedway career ==
Walsh rode in the top tier of British Speedway from 1983 to 2001, riding for various clubs. He won the league title with Ellesmere Port Gunners in 1985.

Walsh completed three spells with Berwick Bandits in 1984, from 1989 to 1992 and again in 1998. His second spell started in 1989, when he transferred from Cradley Heathens. It was at Cradley during the 1987 British League season and 1988 British League seasons that Walsh won the Knockout Cup.

Walsh reached the final of the British Speedway Championship on three occasions in 1995, 1996 and 1997.
