= David Norris (speedway rider) =

British motorcycle speedway rider

- Born: 20 August 1972 (age 54); Eastbourne, England
- Nationality: British (English)

Career history

Great Britain
- 1988–1989, 1993-1994, 1996-2007, 2009: Eastbourne Eagles
- 1990, 1991–1993: Ipswich Witches
- 1995: Reading Racers

Poland
- 1995–1996: Gdańsk
- 1999: Toruń

Sweden
- 2000–2003: Valsarna
- 2005: Vargarna

Team honours
- 2000: Elite League
- 1994, 1997, 2002: Knockout Cup winner
- 1991: British League Fours

David Michael Norris (born 20 August 1972, in Eastbourne, England) is a former British international motorcycle speedway rider. He earned 20 international caps for the England national speedway team and 8 caps for the Great Britain team.

== Career ==
Norris had stints with Reading Racers and Ipswich Witches, but primarily rode for the Eastbourne Eagles in the British League, Premier League, and Elite League. In 2007, he overtook Gordon Kennett as the Eagles' leading scorer, accumulating 5,197 points from just 577 meetings.

As an Eastbourne rider, Norris twice averaged over 9, in 1994 (9.18) and 2004 (9.95). He won the league title with the club in 2000 and the Knockout Cup with the team on three occasions in 1994, 1997 and 2002.

In 2004, aged 32, when adopting a new 'more professional' attitude towards the sport, Norris appeared as a wild card in the British Speedway Grand Prix in 2004 and 2005.

== Retirement ==
A succession of injuries dogged Norris in 2006 and 2007 though and he announced his retirement from speedway in October 2007. He said: "I'm at a stage now where I can't take another hit on my head or neck. If I didn’t have kids and my wife I might consider carrying on, but you can’t just live for yourself." However, after holding talks with his doctor and family, Norris came out of retirement and once again rode for the Eastbourne Eagles during the 2009 season, assisted in the pits by Dean Barker.
