= James Grieves =

Scottish former motorcycle racer

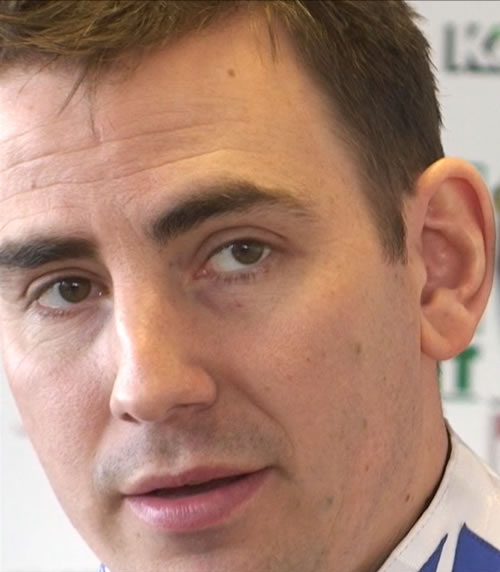
- Born: 28 September 1974 (age 52); Paisley, Scotland
- Nationality: British (Scottish)

Career history
- 1990-1995, 2000-2004, 2009-2010, 2011-2013: Glasgow Tigers
- 1996-1998: Wolverhampton Wolves
- 1998: Berwick Bandits
- 1999: Edinburgh Monarchs
- 2005-2006: Newcastle Diamonds
- 2007-2008, 2010: Redcar Bears

Team honours
- 1993, 1994: British League
- 1993, 1994: British League Knockout Cup
- 1996, 2011: Premier League
- 1996, 1999: Premier League Knockout Cup
- 1997: Premiership
- 2011: Premier League Pairs

James Robert Grieves (born 28 September 1974), is a former professional motorcycle speedway rider from Scotland.

== Career ==
Born in Paisley, Scotland in 1974, Grieves took up speedway at the age of fifteen when he attended one of Olle Nygren's training schools at King's Lynn.

After practising on a 125cc bike built by former Glasgow Tigers riders Colin Caffrey and Kenny McKinna, Grieves progressed to a full size machine and had second-half rides at Tigers matches before making his debut in the team in 1991. He became a full-time Tiger in 1993, the season that the team won the Premier League Championship and Knock-Out Cup double.

Grieves won the double with the team again the following year, and in 1996 moved to Wolverhampton Wolves, with whom he won another league and cup double. Grieves stayed with Wolves for two seasons before losing his place in July 1998, signing for Berwick Bandits a month later. He moved on to Edinburgh Monarchs in 1999 where he attained a real-time average of 9.16.

In 2000, Grieves returned to Glasgow Tigers, a season that ended with his testimonial meeting in October, and he stayed with Glasgow for four more seasons, also riding as number 8 for Wolverhampton in the Elite League in 2003 and 2004.

Grieves moved to Newcastle Diamonds in 2005, and again rode for Wolverhampton, and moved on to Redcar Bears in 2007. After a second season with Redcar which ended with the club's future in doubt due to financial problems, he again returned to Glasgow Tigers in 2009. His 2010 season was interrupted on 6 June, when he sustained a foot injury in a league match against Scunthorpe Scorpions. As a result, the club signed Joe Screen to replace him. At the time, he had represented Glasgow on fifteen occasions, scoring 124 points for an average of 7.94.

The injury was less serious than first feared and Grieves rejoined Redcar as a replacement for Henning Bager. Grieves sustained further injuries with two broken fingers in a crash during a league match at Edinburgh in his Bears' debut on 18 June, and rib injuries sustained at Scunthorpe on 20 August. In his comeback meeting at home to Berwick in the Tweed-Tees Trophy on 9 September, he suffered a badly sprained and bruised wrist. Grieves' 20-year testimonial match took place at Ashfield Stadium on 24 October, with Wolverhampton winning a four-team tournament, ahead of Glasgow, Edinburgh, and Redcar.

Grieves was named in the Glasgow Tigers team for 2011 Premier League speedway season, which included victory in the Premier League Pairs Championship (with Screen) at Somerset, and Tigers ending the season as Premier League champions. On 15 July, Wolverhampton added Grieves to their squad in a 'doubling-up' capacity, alongside Ludvig Lindgren. He continued to ride for Glasgow in 2012 and 2013, a season which he announced would be his last.

At retirement, Grieves was the second highest scorer in Glasgow Tigers history.
