= Paul Hurry =

British motorcycle speedway rider

- Born: 9 April 1975 (age 51); Canterbury, England
- Nationality: British (English)

Career history

Great Britain
- 1991, 1994–1995, 2004–2007, 2010, 2017: Arena Essex Hammers
- 1992–1993: Peterborough Panthers
- 1996: London Lions
- 1997: King's Lynn Stars
- 1998–1999: Oxford Cheetahs
- 2000: Eastbourne Eagles
- 2001-2002: Wolverhampton Wolves
- 2003: Ipswich Witches
- 2009: Poole Pirates
- 2009: Swindon Robins
- 2018, 2021: Kent Kings

Poland
- 1999: Częstochowa

Sweden
- 2000: Smederna
- 2003: Luxo Stars
- 2006: Vargarna

Individual honours
- 2005: European Grasstrack Champion
- 1994: British Under 21 Champion

Team honours
- 2000: Elite League
- 1991, 1992: British League Division Two
- 1991, 1992: Knockout Cup winner
- 1992: Fours Championship winner

Paul William George Hurry (born 9 April 1975) is an English former motorcycle speedway rider. He earned 12 international caps for the England national speedway team and 5 caps for the Great Britain team.

== Career ==
Hurry began his racing career aged 16 with the Arena Essex Hammers in 1991. He was a member of the team that won the league and cup double the 1991 British League Division Two season. Despite the success he experienced during his maiden year he switched to Peterborough Panthers and remarkably completed the treble of league, knockout cup and fours during the 1992 British League Division Two season.

In 1994, Hurry became British under 21 champion and in 2000 he finished in second place at the British Speedway Championship. Hurry was selected to represent the Great Britain national speedway team at the 2001 Speedway World Cup Race-off, but the team failed to reach the final. After spells with various British clubs, Hurry returned to Arena Essex in 2004, where he stayed until 2007.

Hurry appeared to have retired from racing in 2007 due to ongoing problems with an arm injury, but returned to Elite League racing in 2009 to replace the injured Kyle Legault for Poole Pirates and also rode for Swindon Robins as a replacement for Krzysztof Stojanowski.

In 2010, Hurry returned to ride for his first club, now renamed the Lakeside Hammers. Paul suffered horrific leg injuries in the final of the 2010 European Grasstrack Final at La Réole and did not return to racing until 2015. In that time away from the sport he has become a member of the ACU Track Racing Committee and has also become a 'Clerk of the Course'.

In 2026, Hurry was named as the team manager for the Ipswich Witches for the 2026 SGB Premiership season, being brought in by the club's new owners, the Silverstone based company Mayfield.

== British Speedway Championship ==
Finalist

- 1994 (England) @ Coventry 2pts (16th)
- 1995 (England) @ Coventry 4pts (11th)
- 1998 (England) @ Coventry 12pts (3rd)
- 1999 (England) @ Coventry 10pts (5th)
- 2000 (England) @ Coventry 13pts (2nd)
- 2001 (England) @ Coventry 8pts (8th)
- 2002 (England) @ Coventry Coventry 7pts (9th)
- 2003 (England) @ Eastbourne 5pts (13th)
- 2006 (England) @ Belle Vue 2pts (16th)

== World Longtrack Championship ==
Finalist

1996 - Herxheim 3pts (18th)

Grand-Prix Years

- 1997 - Five G.P. 51pts (11th)
- 1998 - One G.P. 20pts (16th)
- 1999 - Five G.P. 72pts (5th)
- 2000 - Five G.P. 77pts (4th)
- 2001 - Four G.P. 46pts (4th)
- 2002 - Four G.P. 40pts (8th)
- 2003 - Four G.P. 58pts (8th)
- 2005 - Four G.P. 58pts (3rd)
- 2007 - Two G.P. 22pts (12th)

Best Individual G.P. Results

- (France) Marmande First 1997, 1999; Second 2003, 2005
- (England) Abingdon-on-Thames Second 1998; Third 2000.
- (Netherlands) Eenrum Third 2000.
- (France) Morizès Third 2005.
- (France) Saint-Macaire Third 2007

== European Grasstrack Championship ==
Finals

- 1994 - (Germany) Cloppenburg 7pts (10th)
- 1995 - (Netherlands) Joure 16pts (4th)
- 1996 - (France) Saint-Colomb-de-Lauzun 13pts (6th)
- 2002 - (Germany) Berghaupten 15pts (4th)
- 2004 - (Netherlands) Eenrum 7pts (12th)
- 2005 - (Germany) Schwarme 18pts (Champion)
- 2009 - (Germany) Berghaupten 4pts (14th)
- 2010 - (France) La Réole 15pts (6th)
- 2017 - (Germany) Hertingen 9pts (12th)
- 2018 - (France) Tayac 5pts (12th)
- 2019 - (Germany) Bad Hersfeld 15thpts (Second)

Best Other Results

- (England) Abingdon Preliminary Round First 1994.
- (Netherlands) Aduard Semi-final First 1994.
- (Germany) Hertingen Semi-final Third 2009.
- (France) La Réole Semi-final First 2002.
- (Netherlands) Noordwolde Semi-final First 2003, 2005.
- (France) Saint-Colomb-de-Lauzun Semi-final First 2001.
- (France) Saint-Macaire Semi-final Third 2017.
- (Netherlands) Stadskanaal Preliminary Round First 1996.
- (England) Truro Semi-final First 2010.

== British Grasstrack Championship ==
Top Three Finishes

- 2000 Runner-up
- 2001 Podium
- 2002 Champion
- 2004 Champion
- 2005 Champion
- 2007 Runner-up
