= 2004 British Speedway Championship =

Seasons
- ← 2003 2005 →

The 2004 British Speedway Championship was the 44th edition of the British Speedway Championship. The Final took place on 7 July at Oxford Stadium in Oxford, England. The Championship was won by Joe Screen, who beat David Norris, Mark Loram and Scott Nicholls in the final heat.

== British Final ==
- 7 July 2004
- (England) Oxford Stadium, Oxford

=== Qualifying ===
| Pos. | Rider | Points | Details |
|---|---|---|---|
| 1 | Scott Nicholls | 15 | (3,3,3,3,3) |
| 2 | David Norris | 14 | (3,2,3,3,3) |
| 3 | Joe Screen | 10 | (3,0,1,3,3) |
| 4 | Mark Loram | 10 | (0,3,3,3,1) |
| 5 | Chris Neath | 10 | (2,3,1,2,2) |
| 6 | Carl Stonehewer | 9 | (1,3,0,2,3) |
| 7 | David Howe | 9 | (3,0,2,2,2) |
| 8 | Danny Bird | 8 | (1,2,3,1,1) |
| 9 | Andrew Moore | 7 | (0,2,1,2,2) |
| 10 | Dean Barker | 7 | (2,1,2,1,1) |
| 11 | Andre Compton | 7 | (1,1,2,1,2) |
| 12 | Chris Harris | 6 | (2,2,1,1,0) |
| 13 | Michael Coles | 4 | (0,1,2,0,1) |
| 14 | Gary Havelock | 3 | (2,1,X,-,-,) |
| 15 | Seemond Stephens | 1 | (1,0,0,0,N) |
| 16 | Stuart Robson | 0 | (0,0,0,0,0) |
| 17 | Chris Mills | 0 | (0) |
| 18 | Craig Branney | 0 | (0) |

=== Final heat ===
| Pos. | Rider | Points |
|---|---|---|
| Gold | Joe Screen | 3 |
| Silver | David Norris | 2 |
| Bronze | Mark Loram | 1 |
| 4 | Scott Nicholls | 0 |

== British Under 21 final ==
Ritchie Hawkins won the British Speedway Under 21 Championship. The final was held at Rye House Stadium on 1 May.

| Pos. | Rider | Points | Final |
|---|---|---|---|
| 1 | Ritchie Hawkins | | 3 |
| 2 | Steve Boxall | | 2 |
| 3 | Edward Kennett | 13 | 1 |
| 4 | Jamie Smith | 13 | 0 |
