= 2002 British Speedway Championship =

Seasons
- ← 2001 2003 →

The 2002 British Speedway Championship was the 42nd edition of the British Speedway Championship. The Final took place on 12 October at Brandon in Coventry, England. The Championship was won by Scott Nicholls, who beat Lee Richardson, David Howe and Mark Loram in the final heat.

== British Final ==
- 12 October 2002
- (England) Brandon Stadium, Coventry

=== Qualifying ===
Pos.	Rider	Points	Details
1	Scott Nicholls	13	(3,3,1,3,3)
2	Lee Richardson	13	(3,2,3,3,2)
3	David Howe	12	(3,3,X,3,3)
4	Mark Loram	12	(2,2,3,2,3)
5	Garry Stead	11	(1,2,3,3,2)
6	Leigh Lanham	10	(3,3,2,2,0)
7	Joe Screen	10	(2,3,2,1,2)
8	Dean Barker	9	(2,1,3,X,3)
9	Paul Hurry	6	(1,2,2,1,1)
10	Phil Morris	6	(2,0,2,0,2)
11	Simon Stead	5	(1,0,1,2,1)
12	Andy Smith	3	(1,1,0,1,0)
13	Danny Bird	2	(0,0,X,2,0)
14	Chris Harris	2	(0,1,X,X,1)
15	Michael Coles	1	(X,X,1,X,X)

=== Final heat ===
Pos.	Rider	Points
Gold	Scott Nicholls	3
Silver	Lee Richardson	2
Bronze	David Howe	1
4	Mark Loram	X

== British Under 21 final ==
Simon Stead won the British Speedway Under 21 Championship for the second consecutive year. The final was held at Owlerton Stadium on 18 April.

Pos.	Rider	Points	Final
1	Simon Stead		3
2	Ross Brady		2
3	Oliver Allen		1
4	David Howe		0
5	Chris Harris		
6	Paul Lee		
7	Chris Neath		
8	Adam Allott		
9	Andrew Appleton		
10	Jamie Smith		
11	Lee Complin		
12	Andrew Moore		
13	Lee Hodgson		
14	Lee Smethills		
15	Glen Phillips		
16	Carl Wilkinson		
17	Matt Cambridge		
18	Aidan Collins		
19	Ritchie Hawkins		
20	James Mann		
21	Rob Grant		
22	Derek Sneddon		
23	Chris Courage		
24	Barrie Evans		
