= 1999 British Speedway Championship =

Seasons
- ← 1998 2000 →

The 1999 British Speedway Championship was the 39th edition of the British Speedway Championship. The Final took place on 23 May at Brandon in Coventry, England. The Championship was won by Mark Loram, with Joe Screen in second place and Chris Louis winning a run-off with Scott Nicholls for third.

== Final ==
- 23 May 1999
- (England) Brandon Stadium, Coventry

Pos.	Rider	Points	Details
Gold	Mark Loram	14	(3,3,3,3,2)
Silver	Joe Screen	13	(3,3,2,2,3)
Bronze	Chris Louis	12+3	(2,3,2,3,2)
4	Scott Nicholls	12+2	(1,3,3,2,3)
5	Paul Hurry	10	(2,2,3,1,2)
6	Stuart Robson	10	(2,2,2,3,1)
7	Sean Wilson	8	(2,X,3,0,3)
8	Gary Havelock	7	(1,0,2,1,3)
9	Carl Stonehewer	6	(1,2,1,2,0)
10	Dean Barker	6	(0,2,1,3,0)
11	David Norris	5	(3,1,1,X,X)
12	Shaun Tacey	4	(3,1,0,0,X)
13	Martin Dugard	4	(0,1,0,2,1)
14	Ian Clarke (Res)	3	(1,2)
15	Andy Smith	3	(X,0,1,1,1)
16	David Hartley (Res)	1	(1)
17	Glenn Cunningham	0	(X,0,X)
18	Ray Morton	0	(X,0,X)

== British Under 21 final ==
Scott Nicholls won the British Speedway Under 21 Championship for the second consecutive season. The final was held at East of England Showground on 28 April, after initially being postponed on 23 April.

Pos.	Rider	Points
1	Scott Nicholls	15
2	Lee Richardson	14
3	David Howe	12+3
4	Simon Stead	12+2
5	Paul Lee	11
6	Barry Campbell	10
7	Matt Read	10
8	Danny Bird	8
9	Ross Brady	5
10	Blair Scott	5
11	Roger Lobb	4
12	Chris Harris	3
13	Grant MacDonald	3
14	Lee Dicken	3
15	Chris Neath	3
16	Marc Norris (res)	1
17	Mark Blackwell (res)	1
18	Oliver Allen	0

== See also ==
- British Speedway Championship
