= 1998 British Speedway Championship =

Seasons
- ← 1997 1999 →

The 1998 British Speedway Championship was the 38th edition of the British Speedway Championship. The Final took place on 17 May at Brandon in Coventry, England. The Championship was won by Chris Louis, with Joe Screen in second place and Paul Hurry in third.

== British Final ==
- 17 May 1998
- (England) Brandon Stadium, Coventry

Pos.	Rider	Points	Details
Gold	Chris Louis	15	(3,3,3,3,3)
Silver	Joe Screen	14	(3,3,2,3,3)
Bronze	Paul Hurry	12	(2,3,1,3,3)
4	Simon Wigg	11	(3,2,3,0,3)
5	Gary Havelock	10	(1,3,3,1,2)
6	Kelvin Tatum	9	(0,2,3,2,2)
7	Andy Smith	9	(2,2,2,1,2)
8	Savalas Clouting	8	(3,2,2,0,1)
9	Scott Nicholls	7	(1,1,2,2,1)
10	Glenn Cunningham	5	(0,1,1,2,1)
11	Carl Stonehewer	5	(2,1,X,1,1)
12	David Norris	5	(1,0,0,2,2)
13	Ray Morton	4	(2,X,1,1,0)
14	Lawrence Hare	3	(0,0,X,3,0)
15	Garry Stead	3	(1,1,1,0,0)
16	Scott Smith	0	(0,0,X)
17	Paul Clews	0	(0)
18	Nick Simmons	0	(0,0)

== British Under 21 final ==
Scott Nicholls won the British Speedway Under 21 Championship for the first time. The final was held at Arena Essex Raceway on 24 April.

Pos.	Rider	Points
1	Scott Nicholls	14
2	Lee Richardson	13
3	Paul Lee	12
4	David Howe	11
5	Andre Compton	11
6	Blair Scott	9+3
7	Andy Meldrum	9+2
8	Simon Stead	7
9	Lee Dicken	7
10	Grant MacDonald	6
11	Leigh Lanham	5
12	Paul Clews	5
13	Oliver Allen	4
14	Paul Oughton	2
15	Barry Campbell	2
16	Brian Turner (res)	2
17	Andrew Appleton	1

== See also ==
- British Speedway Championship
