= 2003 British Speedway Championship =

Seasons
- ← 2002 2004 →

The 2003 British Speedway Championship was the 43rd edition of the British Speedway Championship. The Final took place on 5 July at Arlington Stadium in Eastbourne, England. The Championship was won by Scott Nicholls, who beat Dean Barker, David Norris and Joe Screen in the final heat.

== British Final ==
- 5 July 2003
- (England) Eastbourne

=== Qualifying ===
Pos.	Rider	Points	Details
1	David Norris	15	(3,3,3,3,3)
2	Scott Nicholls	14	(3,3,3,3,2)
3	Dean Barker	13	(2,3,2,3,3)
4	Joe Screen	11	(3,2,1,2,3)
5	Leigh Lanham	10	(1,2,2,3,2)
6	David Howe	8	(0,2,3,1,2)
7	Carl Stonehewer	8	(3,1,1,2,1)
8	Oliver Allen	7	(2,X,2,0,3)
9	Chris Neath	6	(0,3,0,1,2)
10	Stuart Robson	6	(1,1,3,0,1)
11	Glenn Cunningham	5	(1,0,2,2,X)
12	Chris Harris	5	(0,2,0,2,1)
13	Paul Hurry	5	(2,1,1,1,X)
14	James Grieves	3	(2,0,X,X,1)
15	Paul Fry	3	(1,1,0,1,0)
16	Danny Bird	0	(0,0,X,0,0)

=== Final heat ===
Pos.	Rider	Points
Gold	Scott Nicholls	3
Silver	Dean Barker	2
Bronze	David Norris	1
4	Joe Screen	0

== British Under 21 final ==
Simon Stead won the British Speedway Under 21 Championship for the third consecutive year. The final was held at Owlerton Stadium on 24 April.

Pos.	Rider	Points	Final
1	Simon Stead		3
2	Oliver Allen		2
3	Edward Kennett		1
4	Andrew Appleton		0
5	Chris Harris		
6	Aidan Collins		
7	Jamie Smith		
8	Ritchie Hawkins		
9	Adam Allott		
10	Glen Phillips		
11	David Howe		
12	Ricky Ashworth		
13	Chris Neath		
14	Lee Smethills		
15	Andrew Moore		
16	Shane Colvin		
17	Rob Grant		
18	Chris Mills		
19	Rob Finlow		
20	Barrie Evans		
21	Jason King		
22	Danny King		
23	Ben Wilson		
24	Lee Hodgson		
