= 2000 British Speedway Championship =

Annual British motorcycle speedway event

Seasons
- ← 1999 2001 →

The 2000 British Speedway Championship was the 40th edition of the British Speedway Championship. The Final took place on 20 May at Brandon in Coventry, England. The Championship was won by Chris Louis, with Paul Hurry and Martin Dugard finishing second and third respectively.

== British Final ==
- 20 May 2000
- (England) Brandon Stadium, Coventry

| Pos. | Rider | Points | Details |
|---|---|---|---|
| Gold | Chris Louis | 15 | (3,3,3,3,3) |
| Silver | Paul Hurry | 13 | (1,3,3,3,2) |
| Bronze | Martin Dugard | 12 | (3,1,2,3,3) |
| 4 | Mark Loram | 11 | (3,2,2,3,1) |
| 5 | Joe Screen | 10 | (3,0,3,2,2) |
| 6 | Carl Stonehewer | 10 | (2,3,3,2,0) |
| 7 | Lee Richardson | 9 | (2,1,2,2,2) |
| 8 | Scott Nicholls | 7 | (2,3,X,X,2) |
| 9 | Sean Wilson | 7 | (0,2,1,1,3) |
| 10 | Shaun Tacey | 6 | (1,1,2,1,1) |
| 11 | David Howe | 5 | (1,2,1,0,1) |
| 12 | Gary Havelock | 5 | (2,0,1,2,X) |
| 13 | Andy Smith | 4 | (0,0,1,1,2) |
| 14 | Andre Compton | 3 | (1,2,0,X,X) |
| 15 | Stuart Robson | 2 | (0,0,0,1,1) |
| 16 | Glenn Cunningham | 1 | (0,1,0,0,0) |

== British Under 21 final ==
David Howe won the British Speedway Under 21 Championship. The final was held at Armadale Stadium on 7 April.

| Pos. | Rider | Points |
|---|---|---|
| 1 | David Howe | 14+3 |
| 2 | Lee Richardson | 14+2 |
| 3 | Paul Lee | 11+3 |
| 4 | Simon Stead | 12+1 |
| 5 | Barry Campbell | 10 |
| 6 | Danny Bird | 10 |
| 7 | Grant MacDonald | 9 |
| 8 | Andrew Appleton | 8 |
| 9 | Gary Corbett | 8 |
| 10 | Blair Scott | 8 |
| 11 | Chris Neath | 6 |
| 12 | Ross Brady | 5 |
| 13 | Matt Read | 3 |
| 14 | Aidan Collins | 2 |
| 15 | Glen Phillips | 0 |
| 16 | Adam Allott (res) | 0 |
| 17 | Oliver Allen | 0 |
| 18 | Derek Sneddon (res) | 0 |
