= 2005 British Speedway Championship =

Seasons
- ← 2004 2006 →

The 2005 British Speedway Championship was the 45th edition of the British Speedway Championship. The Final took place on 10 July at Oxford Stadium in Oxford, England. The Championship was won by Scott Nicholls, who beat Chris Harris, Joe Screen and Mark Loram in the final heat.

== British Final ==
- 10 July 2005
- (England) Oxford Stadium, Oxford

=== Qualifying ===
Pos.	Rider	Points	Details
1	Scott Nicholls	13	(2,3,2,3,3)
2	Mark Loram	11	(3,0,3,3,2)
3	Joe Screen	11	(3,1,3,3,1)
4	Chris Harris	11	(3,1,3,2,2)
5	Edward Kennett	10	(3,3,1,1,2)
6	Dean Barker	9	(2,2,2,0,3)
7	Simon Stead	7	(X,3,3,X,1)
8	Stuart Robson	7	(2,3,1,0,1)
9	Leigh Lanham	7	(0,2,2,2,1)
10	James Grieves	6	(2,1,1,2,0)
11	Gary Havelock	6	(1,1,1,1,2)
12	Chris Louis	5	(0,0,2,0,3)
13	David Howe	5	(1,0,0,1,3)
14	Andrew Moore	4	(1,0,0,3,0)
15	David McAllan	4	(1,2,0,1,0)
16	Lee Richardson	2	(X,2,X)
17	Jamie Courtney	2	(2)
18	Ben Barker	0	(0)

=== Final heat ===
Pos.	Rider	Points
Gold	Scott Nicholls	3
Silver	Chris Harris	2
Bronze	Joe Screen	1
4	Mark Loram	0

== Under 21 final ==
Edward Kennett won the British Speedway Under 21 Championship for the first time. The final was held at Rye House Stadium on 28 April.

Pos.	Rider	Points	SF	Final
1	Edward Kennett	14	x	3
2	Chris Schramm	11	x	2
3	Richard Hall	12	2	1
4	Danny King	10	3	0
5	Daniel Giffard	10	1	
6	Steve Boxall	11	0	
7	Tommy Allen	9		
8	Ben Wilson	8		
9	Adam Roynon	6		
10	Jason King	5		
11	Jamie Robertson	5		
12	William Lawson	3		
13	Tom Brown	3		
14	Danny Norton	2		
15	Luke Priest	1		
16	Chris Johnson	0		
17	Simon Lambert	0		
