= 1996 Speedway Grand Prix of Poland =

Information
- Date: 18 May 1996
- City: (Poland) Wrocław
- Event: 1 of 6 (7)
- Referee: Graham Brodie

Stadium details
- Stadium: Olympic Stadium
- Length: 387 m (423 yd)
- Track: speedway track

SGP Results
- Best Time
- (gold) Winner: (Denmark) Tommy Knudsen
- (silver) Runner-up: (Sweden) Tony Rickardsson
- (bronze) 3rd place: (Denmark) Hans Nielsen

The 1996 Speedway Grand Prix of Poland was the first race of the 1996 Speedway Grand Prix season. It took place on 18 May in the Olympic Stadium in Wrocław, Poland and was won by Danish rider Tommy Knudsen. Knudsen was the first rider who won in three SGP Events.

== Starting positions draw ==
The Speedway Grand Prix Commission nominated Tomasz Gollob as Wild Card. Gollob was Polish SGP Winner last season.

== Heat details ==
Placing	Draw	Rider	Total	1	2	3	4	5	6	7	8	9	10	11	12	13	14	15	16	17	18	19	20	Pts	Pos	21	22	23	24
1	6	(Denmark) (11) Tommy Knudsen	25		3				3			3							1			1		11	3				3
2	14	(Sweden) (2) Tony Rickardsson	20				2		2					2		3							1	10	4				2
3	3	(Denmark) (1) Hans Nielsen	18	3						1				3				2				2		11	1				1
4	9	(United States) (5) Billy Hamill	16			2		3						1					2		3			11	2				0
5	4	(Sweden) (8) Henrik Gustafsson	14	X							3				E				3				3	9	6			3
6	7	(United Kingdom) (14) Gary Havelock	13		0					3					3	2					1			9	7			2
7	13	(United States) (4) Greg Hancock	12				3	2							2		1					0		8	8			1
8	12	(Poland) (16) Tomasz Gollob	11			3					0		3			1						3		10	5			0
9	8	(United States) (3) Sam Ermolenko	9		2						1			0			2			2				7	10		3
10	5	(United Kingdom) (7) Chris Louis	8		1			1					1					1					2	6	11		2
11	2	(Sweden) (12) Peter Karlsson	7	1					1				0				3				2			7	9		1
12	1	(United Kingdom) (6) Mark Loram	6	2				0				0				0				3				5	12		0
13	16	(United Kingdom) (10) Marvyn Cox	4				1				2	1						E			0			4	15	3
14	11	(United Kingdom) (13) Joe Screen	3			0				2		2					X						0	4	14	2
15	10	(Australia) (9) Leigh Adams	2			1			0						1			3		0				5	13	1
16	15	(Australia) (15) Jason Crump	1				E			0			2						0	1				3	16	0
17	17	(Australia) (17) Craig Boyce	–																					-	17
18	18	(United Kingdom) (18) Andy Smith	–																					-	18
Placing	Draw	Rider	Total	1	2	3	4	5	6	7	8	9	10	11	12	13	14	15	16	17	18	19	20	Pts	Pos	21	22	23	24

Heat 21 (Final D): Riders placed 13th to 16th Heat 22 (Final C): Riders placed 9th to 12th	Heat 23 (Final B): Riders placed 5th to 8th Heat 24 (Final A): Riders placed 1st to 4th

gate A – inside	gate B	gate C	gate D – outside

== The intermediate classification ==
Qualifies for next season's Grand Prix series
Full-time Grand Prix rider
Wild card, track reserve or qualified reserve

Pos.	Rider	Points	POL (Poland)	ITA (Italy)	GER (Germany)	SWE (Sweden)	GBR (United Kingdom)	DEN (Denmark)
1	(Denmark) (11) Tommy Knudsen	25	25					
2	(Sweden) (2) Tony Rickardsson	20	20					
3	(Denmark) (1) Hans Nielsen	18	18					
4	(United States) (5) Billy Hamill	16	16					
5	(Sweden) (8) Henrik Gustafsson	14	14					
6	(United Kingdom) (14) Gary Havelock	13	13					
7	(United States) (4) Greg Hancock	12	12					
8	(Poland) (16) Tomasz Gollob	11	11					
9	(United States) (3) Sam Ermolenko	9	9					
10	(United Kingdom) (7) Chris Louis	8	8					
11	(Sweden) (12) Peter Karlsson	7	7					
12	(United Kingdom) (6) Mark Loram	6	6					
13	(United Kingdom) (10) Marvyn Cox	4	4					
14	(United Kingdom) (13) Joe Screen	3	3					
15	(Australia) (9) Leigh Adams	2	2					
16	(Australia) (15) Jason Crump	1	1					
Rider(s) not classified
	(Australia) (17) Craig Boyce	—	ns					
	(United Kingdom) (18) Andy Smith	—	ns					
Pos.	Rider	Points	POL (Poland)	ITA (Italy)	GER (Germany)	SWE (Sweden)	GBR (United Kingdom)	DEN (Denmark)

== See also ==
- Speedway Grand Prix
- List of Speedway Grand Prix riders
