= 1996 Speedway Grand Prix of Germany =

Third race of the 1996 Speedway Grand Prix season

Information
- Date: 9 July 1996
- City: (Germany) Pocking
- Event: 3 of 6 (9)
- Referee: (Norway) Roy Otto

Stadium details
- Stadium: Rottalstadion
- Track: speedway track

SGP Results
- Best Time
- (gold) Winner: (Denmark) Hans Nielsen
- (silver) Runner-up: (Sweden) Peter Karlsson
- (bronze) 3rd place: (Sweden) Henrik Gustafsson

The 1996 Speedway Grand Prix of Germany was the third race of the 1996 Speedway Grand Prix season. It took place on 9 July in the Rottalstadion in Pocking, Germany It was second German SGP and was won by Danish rider Hans Nielsen. It was the third win of his career.

== Starting positions draw ==
The Speedway Grand Prix Commission nominated Gerd Riss as Wild Card who started in German SPG last season.

Draw 5. (Denmark) (11) Tommy Knudsen → (United Kingdom) (13) Joe Screen
Draw 9. (United Kingdom) (14) Gary Havelock → (United States) (4) Greg Hancock
Draw 17. track reserve → (Poland) (19) Tomasz Gollob
Draw 18. track reserve → Emply

== Heat details ==
Placing	Draw	Rider	Total	1	2	3	4	5	6	7	8	9	10	11	12	13	14	15	16	17	18	19	20	Pts	Pos	21	22	23	24
1	15	(Denmark) (1) Hans Nielsen	25				3			3			3						3	2				14	2				3
2	12	(Sweden) (12) Peter Karlsson	20			2					2		2			3						3		12	3				2
3	13	(Sweden) (8) Henrik Gustafsson	18				2	2							3		3					2		12	4				1
4	8	(Sweden) (2) Tony Rickardsson	16		3						3			3			2			3				14	1				0
5	7	(United Kingdom) (7) Chris Louis	14		2					1					2	2					3			10	6			3
6	9	(United States) (4) Greg Hancock	13			3		3						0					2		3			11	5			2
7	14	(Germany) (16) Gerd Riss	12				0		3					1		1							2	7	7			1
8	5	(United Kingdom) (13) Joe Screen	11		1			0					0					2					3	6	8			0
9	2	(United States) (5) Billy Hamill	9	2					1				1				1				1			6	12		3
10	1	(Australia) (9) Leigh Adams	8	3				1				2				0				0				6	9		2
11	6	(Australia) (15) Jason Crump	7		0				2			3							E			1		6	10		1
12	10	(United Kingdom) (6) Mark Loram	6			1			0						1			3		1				6	11		0
13	3	(United States) (3) Sam Ermolenko	4	1						0				2				X				E		3	14	3
14	11	(United Kingdom) (18) Andy Smith	3			0				2		0					0						1	3	13	2
15	16	(Australia) (17) Craig Boyce	2				1				1	1						X			0			3	15	1
16	4	(United Kingdom) (10) Marvyn Cox	1	0							0				0				1				E	1	16	0
17	17	(Poland) (19) Tomasz Gollob	–																					-	17
	18	None																						-
Placing	Draw	Rider	Total	1	2	3	4	5	6	7	8	9	10	11	12	13	14	15	16	17	18	19	20	Pts	Pos	21	22	23	24

Heat 21 (Final D): Riders placed 13th to 16th Heat 22 (Final C): Riders placed 9th to 12th	Heat 23 (Final B): Riders placed 5th to 8th Heat 24 (Final A): Riders placed 1st to 4th

gate A – inside	gate B	gate C	gate D – outside

== The intermediate classification ==
Qualifies for next season's Grand Prix series
Full-time Grand Prix rider
Wild card, track reserve or qualified reserve

Pos.	Rider	Points	POL (Poland)	ITA (Italy)	GER (Germany)	SWE (Sweden)	GBR (United Kingdom)	DEN (Denmark)
1	(Denmark) (1) Hans Nielsen	68	18	25	25			
2	(Sweden) (2) Tony Rickardsson	54	20	18	16			
3	(United States) (5) Billy Hamill	45	16	20	9			
4	(Denmark) (11) Tommy Knudsen	41	25	16	–			
5	(United States) (4) Greg Hancock	38	12	13	13			
6	(Sweden) (8) Henrik Gustafsson	36	14	4	18			
7	(Sweden) (12) Peter Karlsson	30	7	3	20			
8	(United Kingdom) (7) Chris Louis	31	8	9	14			
9	(United Kingdom) (14) Gary Havelock	27	13	14	–			
10	(United Kingdom) (13) Joe Screen	21	3	7	11			
11	(United States) (3) Sam Ermolenko	14	9	1	4			
12	(United Kingdom) (6) Mark Loram	14	6	2	6			
13	(Australia) (17) Craig Boyce	14	ns	12	2			
14	(United Kingdom) (18) Andy Smith	14	ns	11	3			
15	(United Kingdom) (10) Marvyn Cox	13	4	8	1			
16	(Germany) (16) Gerd Riss	12	–	–	12			
17	(Poland) (16) Tomasz Gollob	11	11	–	ns			
18	(Australia) (9) Leigh Adams	10	2	ns	8			
19	(Australia) (15) Jason Crump	8	1	ns	7			
20	(Italy) (16) Stefano Alfonso	6	–	6	–			
Pos.	Rider	Points	POL (Poland)	ITA (Italy)	GER (Germany)	SWE (Sweden)	GBR (United Kingdom)	DEN (Denmark)

== See also ==
- Speedway Grand Prix
- List of Speedway Grand Prix riders
