= 2006 British Speedway Championship =

Seasons
- ← 2005 2007 →

The 2006 British Speedway Championship was the 46th edition of the British Speedway Championship. The Final took place on 11 June at Belle Vue Stadium in Manchester, England. The Championship was won by Scott Nicholls, who beat Joe Screen, Simon Stead and Chris Harris in the final heat.

== British Final ==
- 11 June 2006
- (England) Belle Vue Stadium, Manchester

=== Qualifying ===
Pos.	Rider	Points	Details
1	Scott Nicholls	13	(3,3,3,1,3)
2	Joe Screen	13	(2,3,2,3,3)
3	Simon Stead	12	(2,2,3,2,3)
4	Chris Harris	11	(1,3,2,3,2)
5	Andy Smith	11	(1,2,3,3,2)
6	Leigh Lanham	10	(3,3,1,2,1)
7	Edward Kennett	8	(3,2,0,1,2)
8	Lee Richardson	8	(2,0,2,2,2)
9	David Howe	7	(0,1,2,1,3)
10	Oliver Allen	6	(1,1,1,3,0)
11	David Norris	5	(3,2,X,-,-)
12	Ricky Ashworth	5	(2,X,3,X,X)
13	Carl Wilkinson	3	(-,0,0,2,1)
14	Garry Stead	3	(0,1,X,1,1)
15	Chris Neath	2	(0,0,1,X,1)
16	Paul Hurry	2	(,1,1.X,-,-)
17	Benji Compton	1	(X,1,0,X)
18	Jonathan Bethell	0	(0,0,0)
19	Adam Roynon	DNS	

=== Final heat ===
Pos.	Rider	Points
Gold	Scott Nicholls	3
Silver	Joe Screen	2
Bronze	Simon Stead	1
4	Chris Harris	0

== British Under 21 final ==
Ben Wilson won the British Speedway Under 21 Championship. The final was held at King's Lynn Stadium on 28 April.

Pos.	Rider	Points	Final
1	Ben Wilson	14	3
2	Danny King	14	2
3	Lewis Bridger	13	1
4	Steve Boxall	12	0
5	Jason King	10	
6	James Wright	10	
7	Edward Kennett	8	
8	James Brundle	7	
9	Richie Dennis	6	
10	Josh Auty	6	
11	Ben Barker	5	
12	Joel Parsons	5	
13	Jamie Courtney	4	
14	Benji Compton	3	
15	Luke Bowen	2	
16	Simon Lambert	1	
17	Robert Mear (res)	0	
18	Ben Hopwood (res)	0	
