= 1996 Speedway Grand Prix of Italy =

Information
- Date: 1 June 1996
- City: (Italy) Lonigo
- Event: 2 of 6 (8)
- Referee: Graham Brodie

Stadium details
- Stadium: Santa Marina Stadium
- Length: 387 m (423 yd)
- Track: speedway track

SGP Results
- Best Time
- (gold) Winner: (Denmark) Hans Nielsen
- (silver) Runner-up: (United States) Billy Hamill
- (bronze) 3rd place: (Sweden) Tony Rickardsson

The 1996 Speedway Grand Prix of Italy was the second race of the 1996 Speedway Grand Prix season. It took place on 1 June in the Santa Marina Stadium in Lonigo, Italy It was the first Italian SGP and was won by Danish rider Hans Nielsen. It was the second win of his career.

== Starting positions draw ==
The Speedway Grand Prix Commission nominated Stefano Alfonso as Wild Card.

== Heat details ==
Placing	Draw	Rider	Total	1	2	3	4	5	6	7	8	9	10	11	12	13	14	15	16	17	18	19	20	Pts	Pos	21	22	23	24
1	1	(Denmark) (1) Hans Nielsen	25	2				2				3				1				3				11	4				3
2	9	(United States) (5) Billy Hamill	20			1		3						3					3		3			13	1				2
3	14	(Sweden) (2) Tony Rickardsson	18				3		3					0		3							2	11	3				1
4	5	(Denmark) (11) Tommy Knudsen	16		3			1					3					3					3	13	2				F
5	4	(United Kingdom) (14) Gary Havelock	14	1							2				3				2				1	9	7			3
6	8	(United States) (4) Greg Hancock	13		2						3			2			3			F				10	5			2
7	3	(Australia) (17) Craig Boyce	12	3						1				1				1				3		9	6			1
8	15	(United Kingdom) (18) Andy Smith	11				2			2			1						0	2				7	8			0
9	10	(United Kingdom) (7) Chris Louis	9			2			2						2			0		1				7	9		3
10	7	(United Kingdom) (10) Marvyn Cox	8		0					3					1	2					0			6	10		2
11	6	(United Kingdom) (13) Joe Screen	7		1				1			2							1			1		6	12		1
12	12	(Italy) (16) Stefano Alfonso	6			3					1		2			0						0		6	11		0
13	11	(Sweden) (8) Henrik Gustafsson	4			0				E		1					2						0	3	15	3
14	16	(Sweden) (12) Peter Karlsson	3				0				E	0						2			2			4	13	2
15	13	(United Kingdom) (6) Mark Loram	2				1	X							0		1					2		4	14	1
16	2	(United States) (3) Sam Ermolenko	1	0					0				0				0				1			1	16	0
17	17	(Australia) (9) Leigh Adams	–																					-	17
18	18	(Australia) (15) Jason Crump	–																					-	18
Placing	Draw	Rider	Total	1	2	3	4	5	6	7	8	9	10	11	12	13	14	15	16	17	18	19	20	Pts	Pos	21	22	23	24

Heat 21 (Final D): Riders placed 13th to 16th Heat 22 (Final C): Riders placed 9th to 12th	Heat 23 (Final B): Riders placed 5th to 8th Heat 24 (Final A): Riders placed 1st to 4th

gate A – inside	gate B	gate C	gate D – outside

== The intermediate classification ==
Qualifies for next season's Grand Prix series
Full-time Grand Prix rider
Wild card, track reserve or qualified reserve

Pos.	Rider	Points	POL (Poland)	ITA (Italy)	GER (Germany)	SWE (Sweden)	GBR (United Kingdom)	DEN (Denmark)
1	(Denmark) (1) Hans Nielsen	43	18	25				
2	(Denmark) (11) Tommy Knudsen	41	25	16				
3	(Sweden) (2) Tony Rickardsson	38	20	18				
4	(United States) (5) Billy Hamill	36	16	20				
5	(United Kingdom) (14) Gary Havelock	27	13	14				
6	(United States) (4) Greg Hancock	25	12	13				
7	(Sweden) (8) Henrik Gustafsson	18	14	4				
8	(United Kingdom) (7) Chris Louis	17	8	9				
9	(United Kingdom) (10) Marvyn Cox	12	4	8				
10	(Australia) (17) Craig Boyce	12	ns	12				
11	(Poland) (16) Tomasz Gollob	11	11	–				
12	(United Kingdom) (18) Andy Smith	11	ns	11				
13	(United States) (3) Sam Ermolenko	10	9	1				
14	(Sweden) (12) Peter Karlsson	10	7	3				
15	(United Kingdom) (13) Joe Screen	10	3	7				
16	(United Kingdom) (6) Mark Loram	8	6	2				
17	(Italy) (16) Stefano Alfonso	6	–	6				
18	(Australia) (9) Leigh Adams	2	2	ns				
19	(Australia) (15) Jason Crump	1	1	ns				
Pos.	Rider	Points	POL (Poland)	ITA (Italy)	GER (Germany)	SWE (Sweden)	GBR (United Kingdom)	DEN (Denmark)

== See also ==
- Speedway Grand Prix
- List of Speedway Grand Prix riders
