= 1996 Speedway Grand Prix of Denmark =

Information
- Date: 21 September 1996
- City: (Denmark) Vojens
- Event: 6 of 6 (12)
- Referee: (United Kingdom) Graham Brodie

Stadium details
- Stadium: Speedway Center
- Track: speedway track

SGP Results
- Best Time
- (gold) Winner: (United States) Billy Hamill
- (silver) Runner-up: (United Kingdom) Mark Loram
- (bronze) 3rd place: (United States) Greg Hancock

The 1996 Speedway Grand Prix of Denmark was the sixth and last race of the 1996 Speedway Grand Prix season. It took place on 21 September in the Speedway Center in Vojens, Denmark It was second Danish SGP and was won by American rider Billy Hamill. It was third win of his career.

== Starting positions draw ==
The Speedway Grand Prix Commission nominated Piotr Protasiewicz from Poland as Wild Card.

Draw 18. (United Kingdom) (14) Gary Havelock → (Poland) (19) Tomasz Gollob

== Heat details ==
Placing	Draw	Rider	Total	1	2	3	4	5	6	7	8	9	10	11	12	13	14	15	16	17	18	19	20	Pts	Pos	21	22	23	24
1	4	(United States) (5) Billy Hamill	25	3							3				3				3				1	13	1				3
2	5	(United Kingdom) (6) Mark Loram	20		2			1					2					3					3	11	4				2
3	12	(United States) (4) Greg Hancock	18			3					1		3			2						3		12	2				1
4	11	(United States) (3) Sam Ermolenko	16			2				2		3					3						2	12	3				0
5	9	(Denmark) (1) Hans Nielsen	14			1		3						3					0		3			10	5			3
6	15	(Sweden) (8) Henrik Gustafsson	13				3			1			1						2	3				10	6			2
7	3	(Sweden) (12) Peter Karlsson	12	1						3				2				1				2		9	8			1
8	6	(Sweden) (2) Tony Rickardsson	11		3				3			2							1			0		9	7			0
9	7	(United Kingdom) (7) Chris Louis	9		1					0					0	3					0			4	12		3
10	1	(Australia) (17) Craig Boyce	8	2				2				0				1				2				7	9		2
11	16	(United Kingdom) (13) Joe Screen	7				1				2	1						0			1			5	11		1
12	10	(Australia) (15) Jason Crump	6			0			1						2			2		1				6	10		0
13	2	(Australia) (9) Leigh Adams	4	0					0				0				2				2			4	14	3
14	14	(Poland) (16) Piotr Protasiewicz	3				2		2					E		F							0	4	13	2
15	13	(Denmark) (11) Tommy Knudsen	2				0	0							1		1					1		3	15	1
16	8	(United Kingdom) (10) Marvyn Cox	1		0						0			1			0			0				1	16	0
17	17	(United Kingdom) (18) Andy Smith	–																					-	17
18	18	(Poland) (19) Tomasz Gollob	–																					-	18
Placing	Draw	Rider	Total	1	2	3	4	5	6	7	8	9	10	11	12	13	14	15	16	17	18	19	20	Pts	Pos	21	22	23	24

Heat 21 (Final D): Riders placed 13th to 16th Heat 22 (Final C): Riders placed 9th to 12th	Heat 23 (Final B): Riders placed 5th to 8th Heat 24 (Final A): Riders placed 1st to 4th

gate A – inside	gate B	gate C	gate D – outside

== The final classification ==
Qualifies for next season's Grand Prix series
Full-time Grand Prix rider
Wild card, track reserve or qualified reserve

Pos.	Rider	Points	POL (Poland)	ITA (Italy)	GER (Germany)	SWE (Sweden)	GBR (United Kingdom)	DEN (Denmark)
Gold	(United States) (5) Billy Hamill	113	16	20	9	25	18	25
Silver	(Denmark) (1) Hans Nielsen	111	18	25	25	9	20	14
Bronze	(United States) (4) Greg Hancock	88	12	13	13	16	16	18
4	(Sweden) (2) Tony Rickardsson	86	20	18	16	14	7	11
5	(Sweden) (8) Henrik Gustafsson	80	14	4	18	20	11	13
6	(Sweden) (12) Peter Karlsson	62	7	3	20	7	13	12
7	(United Kingdom) (6) Mark Loram	58	6	2	6	12	12	20
8	(United Kingdom) (7) Chris Louis	54	8	9	14	8	6	9
9	(United States) (3) Sam Ermolenko	52	9	1	4	13	9	16
10	(Australia) (15) Jason Crump	45	1	ns	7	6	25	6
11	(Denmark) (11) Tommy Knudsen	44	25	16	–	–	1	2
12	(Poland) (16) (19) Tomasz Gollob	43	11	–	ns	18	14	ns
13	(United Kingdom) (13) Joe Screen	38	3	7	11	2	8	7
14	(Australia) (17) Craig Boyce	30	ns	12	2	4	4	8
15	(Australia) (9) Leigh Adams	28	2	ns	8	11	3	4
16	(United Kingdom) (14) Gary Havelock	27	13	14	–	–	–	–
17	(United Kingdom) (18) Andy Smith	19	ns	11	3	3	2	ns
18	(United Kingdom) (10) Marvyn Cox	15	4	8	1	1	ns	1
19	(Germany) (16) Gerd Riss	12	–	–	12	–	–	–
20	(Italy) (16) Stefano Alfonso	6	–	6	–	–	–	–
21	(Poland) (16) Piotr Protasiewicz	3	–	–	–	–	–	3
Rider(s) not classified
	(Denmark) (20) Jan Stæchmann	—	–	–	–	ns	ns	–
	(Sweden) (21) Mikael Karlsson	—	–	–	–	ns	–	–
Pos.	Rider	Points	POL (Poland)	ITA (Italy)	GER (Germany)	SWE (Sweden)	GBR (United Kingdom)	DEN (Denmark)

== See also ==
- Speedway Grand Prix
- List of Speedway Grand Prix riders
