= 1996 Speedway Grand Prix of Great Britain =

(United Kingdom) 1996 Speedway Grand Prix of Great Britain

Information
- Date: 31 August 1996
- City: (United Kingdom) London
- Event: 5 of 6 (11)
- Referee: (Denmark) Jørgen Jensen

Stadium details
- Stadium: London Stadium
- Track: speedway track

SGP Results
- Best Time
- (gold) Winner: (Australia) Jason Crump
- (silver) Runner-up: (Denmark) Hans Nielsen
- (bronze) 3rd place: (United States) Billy Hamill

The 1996 Speedway Grand Prix of Great Britain was the fifth race of the 1996 Speedway Grand Prix season. It took place on 31 August in the London Stadium in London, Great Britain It was the second Swedish SGP and was won by Australian rider Jason Crump, being the first win of his career.

== Starting positions draw ==
injury (United Kingdom) (14) Gary Havelock was replaced

== Heat details ==
Placing	Draw	Rider	Total	1	2	3	4	5	6	7	8	9	10	11	12	13	14	15	16	17	18	19	20	Pts	Pos	21	22	23	24
1	14	(Australia) (15) Jason Crump	25				2		2					2		1							3	10	3				3
2	9	(Denmark) (1) Hans Nielsen	20			3		1						3					2		3			12	1				2
3	2	(United States) (5) Billy Hamill	18	3					1				2				2				2			10	4				1
4	6	(United States) (4) Greg Hancock	16		1				3			3							1			3		11	2				0
5	15	(Poland) (19) Tomasz Gollob	14				0			0			3						3	3				9	5			3
6	5	(Sweden) (12) Peter Karlsson	13		3			3					0					3					T	9	6			2
7	12	(United Kingdom) (6) Mark Loram	12			2					2		1			2						2		9	7			1
8	13	(Sweden) (8) Henrik Gustafsson	11				3	E							3		1					1		8	8			0
9	7	(United States) (3) Sam Ermolenko	9		2					1					1	3					1			8	10		3
10	4	(United Kingdom) (13) Joe Screen	8	1							3				2				0				2	8	9		2
11	1	(Sweden) (2) Tony Rickardsson	7	2				2				1				0				2				7	11		1
12	3	(United Kingdom) (7) Chris Louis	6	0						3				0				2				0		5	12		0
13	8	(Australia) (17) Craig Boyce	4		0						0			1			3			X				4	14	3
14	10	(Australia) (9) Leigh Adams	3			1			0						0			0		1				2	16	2
15	11	(United Kingdom) (18) Andy Smith	2			0				2		2					0						1	5	13	1
16	16	(Denmark) (11) Tommy Knudsen	1				1				1	0						1			0			3	15	X
17	17	(United Kingdom) (10) Marvyn Cox	–																					-	17
18	18	(Denmark) (20) Jan Stæchmann	–																					-	18
Placing	Draw	Rider	Total	1	2	3	4	5	6	7	8	9	10	11	12	13	14	15	16	17	18	19	20	Pts	Pos	21	22	23	24

Heat 21 (Final D): Riders placed 13th to 16th Heat 22 (Final C): Riders placed 9th to 12th	Heat 23 (Final B): Riders placed 5th to 8th Heat 24 (Final A): Riders placed 1st to 4th

gate A – inside	gate B	gate C	gate D – outside

== The intermediate classification ==
Qualifies for next season's Grand Prix series
Full-time Grand Prix rider
Wild card, track reserve or qualified reserve

Pos.	Rider	Points	POL (Poland)	ITA (Italy)	GER (Germany)	SWE (Sweden)	GBR (United Kingdom)	DEN (Denmark)
1	(Denmark) (1) Hans Nielsen	97	18	25	25	9	20	
2	(United States) (5) Billy Hamill	88	16	20	9	25	18	
3	(Sweden) (2) Tony Rickardsson	75	20	18	16	14	7	
4	(United States) (4) Greg Hancock	70	12	13	13	16	16	
5	(Sweden) (8) Henrik Gustafsson	67	14	4	18	20	11	
6	(Sweden) (12) Peter Karlsson	50	7	3	20	7	13	
7	(United Kingdom) (7) Chris Louis	45	8	9	14	8	6	
8	(Poland) (16) Tomasz Gollob	43	11	–	ns	18	14	
9	(Denmark) (11) Tommy Knudsen	42	25	16	–	–	1	
10	(Australia) (15) Jason Crump	39	1	ns	7	6	25	
11	(United Kingdom) (6) Mark Loram	38	6	2	6	12	12	
12	(United States) (3) Sam Ermolenko	36	9	1	4	13	9	
13	(United Kingdom) (13) Joe Screen	31	3	7	11	2	8	
14	(United Kingdom) (14) Gary Havelock	27	13	14	–	–	–	
15	(Australia) (9) Leigh Adams	24	2	ns	8	11	3	
16	(Australia) (17) Craig Boyce	22	ns	12	2	4	4	
17	(United Kingdom) (18) Andy Smith	19	ns	11	3	3	2	
18	(United Kingdom) (10) Marvyn Cox	14	4	8	1	1	ns	
19	(Germany) (16) Gerd Riss	12	–	–	12	–	–	
20	(Italy) (16) Stefano Alfonso	6	–	6	–	–	–	
Rider(s) not classified
	(Denmark) (20) Jan Stæchmann	—	–	–	–	ns	ns	
	(Sweden) (21) Mikael Karlsson	—	–	–	–	ns	–	
Pos.	Rider	Points	POL (Poland)	ITA (Italy)	GER (Germany)	SWE (Sweden)	GBR (United Kingdom)	DEN (Denmark)

== See also ==
- Speedway Grand Prix
- List of Speedway Grand Prix riders
