= 1997 British Speedway Championship =

Seasons
- ← 1996 1998 →

The 1997 British Speedway Championship was the 37th edition of the British Speedway Championship. The Final took place on 1 June at Brandon in Coventry, England. The Championship was won by Mark Loram, who won took the title after winning a run-off with rival Chris Louis. Sean Wilson finished third, taking the final place on the podium.

== British Final ==
- 1 June 1997
- (England) Brandon Stadium, Coventry

Pos.	Rider	Points	Details
Gold	Mark Loram	14+3	(2,3,3,3,3)
Silver	Chris Louis	14+2	(3,2,3,3,3)
Bronze	Sean Wilson	11	(3,2,2,3,1)
4	Joe Screen	10	(3,3,2,2,X)
5	Dean Barker	10	(3,3,2,0,2)
6	Gary Havelock	10	(2,3,3,1,1)
7	Carl Stonehewer	9	(1,2,1,3,2)
8	Kelvin Tatum	8	(2,0,2,1,3)
9	Andy Smith	7	(2,1,1,1,2)
10	David Norris	6	(1,X,3,2,X)
11	Scott Nicholls	6	(0,1,X,2,3)
12	Neville Tatum	5	(1,2,0,0,2)
13	Garry Stead	4	(1,1,1,0,1)
14	Alun Rossiter	3	(0,0,0,2,1)
15	David Walsh	2	(X,0,1,1,0)
16	Scott Smith	0	(X,1,X,0,0)

== British Under 21 final ==
Leigh Lanham won the British Speedway Under 21 Championship. The final was held at King's Lynn Stadium on 23 April.

Pos.	Rider	Points
1	Leigh Lanham	14
2	Lee Richardson	13
3	Scott Nicholls	12
4	Stuart Robson	11
5	David Howe	10
6	Paul Lee	9
7	Bobby Eldridge	9
8	Andre Compton	8
9	Barry Campbell	5+3
10	Graeme Gordon	5+2
11	David Meldrum	4
12	Paul Clews	4
13	Paul Lydes Uings	4
14	Jamie Birkinshaw	3
15	John Wilson	1
16	David McAllan	2
17	Darren Andrews	0

== See also ==
- British Speedway Championship
