= 1996 Speedway Grand Prix of Sweden =

Motorcycle race championship

Information
- Date: 10 August 1996
- City: (Sweden) Linköping
- Event: 4 of 6 (10)
- Referee: Graham Brodie

Stadium details
- Stadium: Motorstadium
- Track: speedway track

SGP Results
- Best Time
- (gold) Winner: (United States) Billy Hamill
- (silver) Runner-up: (Sweden) Henrik Gustafsson
- (bronze) 3rd place: (Poland) Tomasz Gollob

The 1996 Speedway Grand Prix of Sweden was the fourth race of the 1996 Speedway Grand Prix season. It took place on 10 August in the Motorstadium in Linköping, Sweden It was the second Swedish SGP and was won by American rider Billy Hamill. It was the second win of his career.

== Starting positions draw ==
(Denmark) (11) Tommy Knudsen
(United Kingdom) (14) Gary Havelock

both was replaced by track reserve

Draw 17. track reserve → (Denmark) (20) Jan Stæchmann
Draw 18. track reserve → (Sweden) (21) Mikael Karlsson

Tomasz Gollob (#19) also rode.

== Heat details ==
Placing	Draw	Rider	Total	1	2	3	4	5	6	7	8	9	10	11	12	13	14	15	16	17	18	19	20	Pts	Pos	21	22	23	24
1	16	(United States) (5) Billy Hamill	25				2				3	2						2			3			12	2				3
2	9	(Sweden) (8) Henrik Gustafsson	20			3		3						3					2		2			13	1				2
3	6	(Poland) (19) Tomasz Gollob	18		3				3			1							1			3		11	4				1
4	1	(United States) (4) Greg Hancock	16	3				2				3				3				0				11	3				X
5	15	(Sweden) (2) Tony Rickardsson	14				3			2			2						3	1				11	6			3
6	10	(United States) (3) Sam Ermolenko	13			2			1						X			3		3				9	7			2
7	8	(United Kingdom) (6) Mark Loram	12		2						0			2			1			2				7	8			1
8	2	(Australia) (9) Leigh Adams	11	2					2				3				3				1			11	5			0
9	13	(Denmark) (1) Hans Nielsen	9				1	1							3		0					2		7	9		3
10	4	(United Kingdom) (7) Chris Louis	8	0							2				X				E				3	5	10		2
11	12	(Sweden) (12) Peter Karlsson	7			1					1		1			1						1		5	12		1
12	3	(Australia) (15) Jason Crump	6	1						3				1				0				0		5	11		X
13	7	(Australia) (17) Craig Boyce	4		0					0					2	2					0			4	13	3
14	11	(United Kingdom) (18) Andy Smith	3			X				1		0					2						0	3	15	2
15	5	(United Kingdom) (13) Joe Screen	2		1			0					0					1					2	4	14	1
16	14	(United Kingdom) (10) Marvyn Cox	1				0		0					0		0							1	1	16	0
17	17	(Denmark) (20) Jan Stæchmann	–																					-	17
18	18	(Sweden) (21) Mikael Karlsson	–																					-	18
Placing	Draw	Rider	Total	1	2	3	4	5	6	7	8	9	10	11	12	13	14	15	16	17	18	19	20	Pts	Pos	21	22	23	24

Heat 21 (Final D): Riders placed 13th to 16th Heat 22 (Final C): Riders placed 9th to 12th	Heat 23 (Final B): Riders placed 5th to 8th Heat 24 (Final A): Riders placed 1st to 4th

gate A – inside	gate B	gate C	gate D – outside

== The intermediate classification ==
Qualifies for next season's Grand Prix series
Full-time Grand Prix rider
Wild card, track reserve or qualified reserve

Pos.	Rider	Points	POL (Poland)	ITA (Italy)	GER (Germany)	SWE (Sweden)	GBR (United Kingdom)	DEN (Denmark)
1	(Denmark) (1) Hans Nielsen	77	18	25	25	9		
2	(United States) (5) Billy Hamill	70	16	20	9	25		
3	(Sweden) (2) Tony Rickardsson	68	20	18	16	14		
4	(Sweden) (8) Henrik Gustafsson	56	14	4	18	20		
5	(United States) (4) Greg Hancock	54	12	13	13	16		
6	(Denmark) (11) Tommy Knudsen	41	25	16	–	–		
7	(United Kingdom) (7) Chris Louis	39	8	9	14	8		
8	(Sweden) (12) Peter Karlsson	37	7	3	20	7		
9	(Poland) (16) Tomasz Gollob	29	11	–	ns	18		
10	(United States) (3) Sam Ermolenko	27	9	1	4	13		
11	(United Kingdom) (14) Gary Havelock	27	13	14	–	–		
12	(United Kingdom) (6) Mark Loram	26	6	2	6	12		
13	(United Kingdom) (13) Joe Screen	23	3	7	11	2		
14	(Australia) (9) Leigh Adams	21	2	ns	8	11		
15	(Australia) (17) Craig Boyce	18	ns	12	2	4		
16	(United Kingdom) (18) Andy Smith	17	ns	11	3	3		
17	(United Kingdom) (10) Marvyn Cox	14	4	8	1	1		
18	(Australia) (15) Jason Crump	14	1	ns	7	6		
19	(Germany) (16) Gerd Riss	12	–	–	12	–		
20	(Italy) (16) Stefano Alfonso	6	–	6	–	–		
Rider(s) not classified
	(Denmark) (20) Jan Stæchmann	—	–	–	–	ns		
	(Sweden) (21) Mikael Karlsson	—	–	–	–	ns		
Pos.	Rider	Points	POL (Poland)	ITA (Italy)	GER (Germany)	SWE (Sweden)	GBR (United Kingdom)	DEN (Denmark)

== See also ==
- Speedway Grand Prix
- List of Speedway Grand Prix riders
