= 2001 British Speedway Championship =

Seasons
- ← 2000 2002 →

The 2001 British Speedway Championship was the 41st edition of the British Speedway Championship. The Final took place on 26 May at Brandon in Coventry, England. The Championship was won by Mark Loram, with Stuart Robson winning a run-off against Martin Dugard for second place on the rostrum.

== British Final ==
- 26 May 2001
- (England) Brandon Stadium, Coventry

Pos.	Rider	Points	Details
Gold	Mark Loram	14	(2,3,3,3,3)
Silver	Stuart Robson	12+3	(2,3,2,3,2)
Bronze	Martin Dugard	12+2	(3,1,3,3,2)
4	Carl Stonehewer	11	(3,2,3,2,1)
5	Scott Nicholls	10	(X,2,3,2,3)
6	Gary Havelock	9	(3,2,1,2,1)
7	Paul Fry	9	(1,1,2,2,3)
8	Paul Hurry	8	(1,0,1,3,3)
9	Chris Louis	6	(3,3,X)
10	Sean Wilson	6	(0,1,2,1,1)
11	Alan Mogridge	5	(0,1,2,1,1)
12	Ray Morton	5	(1,1,2,1,X)
13	Andy Smith	2	(0,0,X,2,0)
14	Lee Richardson	3	(X,3,X,X,X)
15	David Norris	2	(0,2,X)
16	Dean Barker	2	(2)

== British Under 21 final ==
Simon Stead won the British Speedway Under 21 Championship for the first time. The final was held at Monmore Green Stadium on 23 April.

Pos.	Rider	Points
1	Simon Stead	15
2	David Howe	12+3
3	Paul Lee	12+2
4	Oliver Allen	12+1
5	Chris Harris	10
6	Lee Smethills	9
7	Ross Brady	8
8	Rob Grant	7
9	Andrew Appleton	7
10	Blair Scott	7
11	Aidan Collins	5
12	Mark Steel	4
13	Glen Phillips	4
14	Marc Norris	4
15	Nick Simmons	3
16	Adam Allott	1
