= 1987 Individual Speedway Junior European Championship =

European motorcycle speedway event

European Under-21 Championship
- Venue: Zielona Góra Speedway Stadium
- Location: Zielona Góra, Poland
- Start date: 11 July 1987

The 1987 Individual Speedway Junior European Championship was the eleventh edition of the European motorcycle speedway Under-21 Championships. It was the last Championship limited to European riders.

The event was won by Gary Havelock of England.

== European final ==
- 11 July 1987
- (Poland) Zielona Góra Speedway Stadium, Zielona Góra

Placing	Rider	Total	1	2	3	4	5	6	7	8	9	10	11	12	13	14	15	16	17	18	19	20	Pts	Pos	21
1	(England) (13) Gary Havelock	13				3	2							3		3					2		13	1	
2	(Poland) (8) Piotr Świst	11		3						3			2			2			1				11	2	3
3	(England) (6) Sean Wilson	11		2				1			2							3			3		11	3	2
4	(Sweden) (12) Bo Arrhén	11			3					2		2			3						1		11	4	1
5	(West Germany) (10) Tommy Dunker	11			2			3						2			2		2				11	5	0
6	(Czechoslovakia) (7) Gašpar Forgáč	8		1					3					1	1					2			8	6	
7	(Czechoslovakia) (14) Vladimír Kalina	7				2		2					0		0							3	7	7	
8	(Sweden) (1) Niklas Karlsson	6	3				3				X				-				-				6	8	
9	(Norway) (2) Tor Einar Hielm	6	1					0				3				1				1			6	9	
10	(United States) (11) Ronnie Correy	5			0				X		3					F						2	5	10	
11	(Czechoslovakia) (9) Borivoj Hadek	5			1		0						1					0		3			5	11	
12	(Poland) (15) Cezary Owiżyc	5				1			2			0						2	0				5	12	
13	(Denmark) (4) Torben Hansen	5	2							1				0				1				1	5	13	
14	(Soviet Union) (3) Oleg Kurguskin	4	E						1				3				X				0		4	14	
15	(Poland) (16) Sławomir Drabik	2				F				0	1						1			0			2	15	
16	(Denmark) (5) Allan Johansen	2		0			1					1					-					-	2	16	
R1	(Sweden) (R1) Peter Nahlin	8													2		3		3			0	8	R1	
Placing	Rider	Total	1	2	3	4	5	6	7	8	9	10	11	12	13	14	15	16	17	18	19	20	Pts	Pos	21

m - exclusion for exceeding two minute time allowance • t - exclusion for touching the tapes • x - other exclusion • e - retired or mechanical failure • f - fell • ns - non-starter • nc - non-classify

gate A - inside	gate B	gate C	gate D - outside
