= 1993 Speedway Under-21 World Championship =

European motorcycle speedway event

World Under-21 Championship
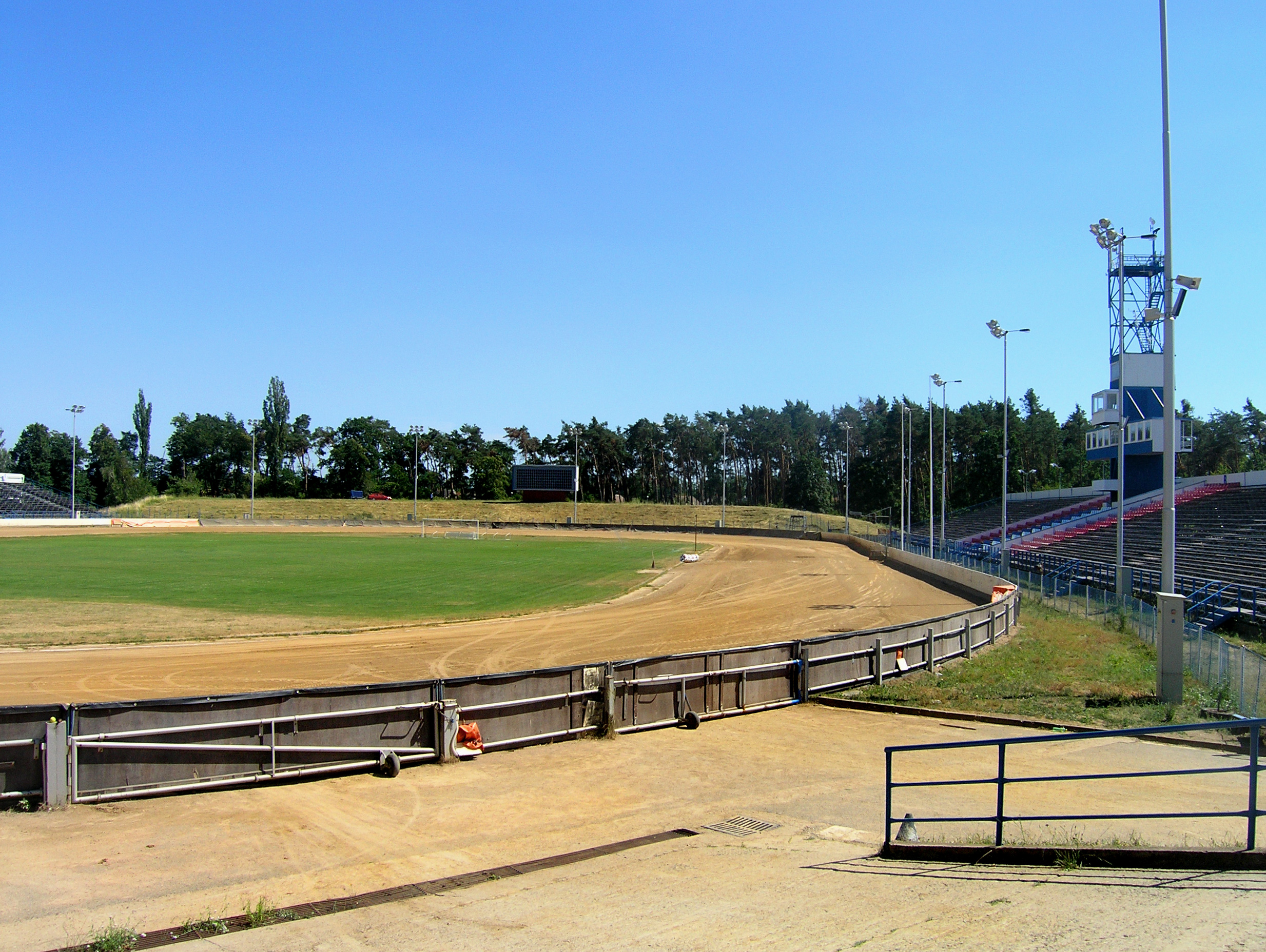
- Svítkov Stadion hosted the 1993 final
- Venue: Svítkov Stadion
- Location: Pardubice, Czech Republic
- Start date: 15 August 1993

The 1993 Individual Speedway Junior World Championship was the 17th edition of the World motorcycle speedway Under-21 Championships.

The final was won by Joe Screen of England after he defeated Mikael Karlsson in a run-off for the title.

== World final ==
- 15 August 1993
- (Czech Republic) Svítkov Stadion, Pardubice

Placing	Rider	Total	1	2	3	4	5	6	7	8	9	10	11	12	13	14	15	16	17	18	19	20	Pts	Pos	21	22
1	(England) (5) Joe Screen	14		3			3					2					3					3	14	1		3
2	(Sweden) (7) Mikael Karlsson	14		2					3					3	3					3			14	2		2
3	(Norway) (10) Rune Holta	10			3			2						2			2		1				10	3	3	
4	(Poland) (6) Piotr Baron	10		1				0			3							3			3		10	4	2	
5	(Poland) (14) Piotr Protasiewicz	8				0		1					3		2							2	8	5		
6	(United States) (1) Josh Larsen	8	E				2				2				1				3				8	6		
7	(Poland) (15) Tomasz Bajerski	8				3			1			1						1	2				8	7		
8	(Czech Republic) (12) Tomáš Topinka	7			2					2		3			0						X		7	8		
9	(Poland) (13) Grzegorz Rempala	7				1	0							1		3					2		7	9		
10	(Czech Republic) (2) Antonín Šváb Jr.	7	2					3				0				1				1			7	10		
11	(Sweden) (11) Niklas Klingberg	7			1				2		1					2						1	7	11		
12	(Denmark) (16) Jacob Olsen	6				2				1	0						1			2			6	12		
13	(Denmark) (9) Rene Madsen	4			0		1						1					2		0			4	13		
14	(Poland) (8) Adam Łabędzki	2		E						T			2			0			E				2	14		
15	(Sweden) (4) Stefan Ekberg	1	1							0				E				0				0	1	15		
16	(Australia) (3) Jason Crump	0	NS						NS				NS				NS				NS		0	16		
R1	(Czech Republic) (R1) Marián Jirout	3	3						0				0				0				E		3	R1		
R2	(England) (R2) Ben Howe	3								3													3	R2		
Placing	Rider	Total	1	2	3	4	5	6	7	8	9	10	11	12	13	14	15	16	17	18	19	20	Pts	Pos	21	22

m - exclusion for exceeding two minute time allowance • t - exclusion for touching the tapes • x - other exclusion • e - retired or mechanical failure • f - fell • ns - non-starter • nc - non-classify

gate A - inside	gate B	gate C	gate D - outside
