= Jacob Olsen =

Danish speedway rider

- Born: 18 September 1972 (age 54); Haderslev, Denmark
- Nationality: Danish

Career history

Denmark
- 1992: Fjelsted
- 1994–1995: Vojens
- 1999: Slangerup

Great Britain
- 1993–1994: Coventry Bees
- 1995: Wolverhampton Wolves

Individual honours
- 1989: Danish U21 bronze medal

Jacob Olsen (born 18 September 1972) is a former motorcycle speedway rider from Denmark. He earned four caps for the Denmark national speedway team and later became a promoter of speedway.

== Career ==
Olsen came to prominence after reaching the final of the Under-21 World Championship on two occasions in 1991 and 1993. He had previously won the bronze medal in the Danish Under 21 Individual Speedway Championship in 1989.

Olsen started racing in the British leagues during the 1993 British League season, when riding for the Coventry Bees. He also rode in the top tier of British speedway for Wolverhampton Wolves during the 1995 Premier League speedway season.

== Family ==
Olsen's father Ole was one of the all-time great speedway riders.
