= Morten Andersen (speedway rider) =

Danish speedway rider

- Born: 11 April 1970 (age 56); Middelfart, Denmark
- Nationality: Danish

Career history

Denmark
- 1991–1995: Fjelsted

Great Britain
- 1991: Swindon
- 1992: Oxford
- 1993–1994: Cradley Heath
- 1995: King's Lynn

Individual honours
- 1991: World U21 silver medal
- 1991: Danish U21 bronze medal

Team honours
- 1992: World Cup finalist
- 1992: Danish Speedway League

Morten Andersen (born 11 April 1970) is a former motorcycle speedway rider from Denmark.

== Career ==
Andersen made his debut in the British League with Swindon Robins during the 1991 British League season. It was during 1991 that he also reached the final of the Speedway Under-21 World Championship, having previously won the bronze medal at the Danish Under 21 Individual Speedway Championship. During the event, held at Brandon Stadium in Coventry, Andersen took the silver medal after finishing second behind fellow Dane Brian Andersen. Both riders had finished on 14 points, but Brian Andersen won the race for the title.

Andersen also reached the finals of the Danish Individual Speedway Championship in 1993 and 1994.

The following season, Andersen joined Oxford Cheetahs for the 1992 British League season, a season where he represented the Denmark national speedway team in the 1992 Speedway World Team Cup final.

Andersen joined Cradley Heath for two seasons (1993 and 1994). His final season in Britain was with the King's Lynn Stars in 1995. He retired the same season after suffering a serious injury - ironically riding at Cradley - after which Doctors told him any further crashes could result in life changing repercussions.
