= 1996 Speedway Grand Prix =

2nd season of the Speedway Grand Prix

Season details
- Dates: May 18 - September 21
- Events: 6
- Cities: 6
- Countries: 6
- Riders: 17 permanents 1 wild card(s)
- Heats: 144 (in 6 events)

Winners
- Champion: USA Billy Hamill
- Runner-up: DEN Hans Nielsen
- 3rd place: USA Greg Hancock

The 1996 Speedway Grand Prix was the 51st edition of the official World Championship to determine the world champion rider. It was the second season in the Speedway Grand Prix era and was used to determine the Speedway World Champion.

The world title was won by Billy Hamill; it was his first and only World Champion title. Defending champion Hans Nielsen was set to win his fifth world crown with a nine-point lead going into the last of the six events at Vojens. However Hamill won the event gaining 25 points and Nielsen only managed 14 points leaving the Dane two points behind the American in the final standings.

== Event format ==
During 1996 the initial SGP scoring system used in 1995 remained in place. Each rider raced every other in the meeting with the top 4 qualifying for a final - the points for all other riders determined their finishing position in the meeting and therefore their championship Grand Prix points. The 4 finalists scored 25, 20, 18 and 16 points, with the remainder scoring 14, 13, 12, 11, 9, 8, 7, 6, 4, 3, 2, 1.

== Qualification for Grand Prix ==
The 1996 season had 17 permanent riders and one wild card at each event. The permanent riders are highlighted in the results table below.

== Calendar ==
Round	Date	City and venue	Winner	Runner-up	3rd placed	4th placed	Results
1	May 18	(Poland) Wrocław , Poland; Olympic Stadium	(Denmark) Tommy Knudsen	(Sweden) Tony Rickardsson	(Denmark) Hans Nielsen	(United States) Billy Hamill	results
2	June 14	(Italy) Lonigo , Italy; Santa Marina Stadium	(Denmark) Hans Nielsen	(United States) Billy Hamill	(Sweden) Tony Rickardsson	(Denmark) Tommy Knudsen	results
3	July 6	(Germany) Pocking , Germany; Rottalstadion	(Denmark) Hans Nielsen	(Sweden) Peter Karlsson	(Sweden) Henrik Gustafsson	(Sweden) Tony Rickardsson	results
4	August 10	(Sweden) Linköping , Sweden; Motorstadium	(United States) Billy Hamill	(Sweden) Henrik Gustafsson	(Poland) Tomasz Gollob	(United States) Greg Hancock	results
5	August 31	(United Kingdom) London , Great Britain; London Stadium	(Australia) Jason Crump	(Denmark) Hans Nielsen	(United States) Billy Hamill	(United States) Greg Hancock	results
6	September 21	(Denmark) Vojens , Denmark; Speedway Center	(United States) Billy Hamill	(United Kingdom) Mark Loram	(United States) Greg Hancock	(United States) Sam Ermolenko	results

== Final standings ==
Qualifies for next season's Grand Prix series
Full-time Grand Prix rider
Wild card, track reserve or qualified reserve

Pos.	Rider	Points	POL (Poland)	ITA (Italy)	GER (Germany)	SWE (Sweden)	GBR (United Kingdom)	DEN (Denmark)
Gold	(United States) (5) Billy Hamill	113	16	20	9	25	18	25
Silver	(Denmark) (1) Hans Nielsen	111	18	25	25	9	20	14
Bronze	(United States) (4) Greg Hancock	88	12	13	13	16	16	18
4	(Sweden) (2) Tony Rickardsson	86	20	18	16	14	7	11
5	(Sweden) (8) Henrik Gustafsson	80	14	4	18	20	11	13
6	(Sweden) (12) Peter Karlsson	62	7	3	20	7	13	12
7	(United Kingdom) (6) Mark Loram	58	6	2	6	12	12	20
8	(United Kingdom) (7) Chris Louis	54	8	9	14	8	6	9
9	(United States) (3) Sam Ermolenko	52	9	1	4	13	9	16
10	(Australia) (15) Jason Crump	45	1	ns	7	6	25	6
11	(Denmark) (11) Tommy Knudsen	44	25	16	–	–	1	2
12	(Poland) (16) (19) Tomasz Gollob	43	11	–	ns	18	14	ns
13	(United Kingdom) (13) Joe Screen	38	3	7	11	2	8	7
14	(Australia) (17) Craig Boyce	30	ns	12	2	4	4	8
15	(Australia) (9) Leigh Adams	28	2	ns	8	11	3	4
16	(United Kingdom) (14) Gary Havelock	27	13	14	–	–	–	–
17	(United Kingdom) (18) Andy Smith	19	ns	11	3	3	2	ns
18	(United Kingdom) (10) Marvyn Cox	15	4	8	1	1	ns	1
19	(Germany) (16) Gerd Riss	12	–	–	12	–	–	–
20	(Italy) (16) Stefano Alfonso	6	–	6	–	–	–	–
21	(Poland) (16) Piotr Protasiewicz	3	–	–	–	–	–	3
Rider(s) not classified
	(Denmark) (20) Jan Stæchmann	—	–	–	–	ns	ns	–
	(Sweden) (21) Mikael Karlsson	—	–	–	–	ns	–	–
Pos.	Rider	Points	POL (Poland)	ITA (Italy)	GER (Germany)	SWE (Sweden)	GBR (United Kingdom)	DEN (Denmark)

== See also ==
- motorcycle speedway
