= Shaun Tacey =

English speedway rider

- Born: 27 November 1974 (age 51); Norwich, England
- Nationality: British (English)

Career history

Great Britain
- 1992–1993, 2007, 2008: Ipswich Witches
- 1993, 2001–2002, 2005–2006: Arena Essex Hammers
- 1994–2001, 2004: Coventry Bees
- 1997, 2001, 2004, 2008: King's Lynn Stars
- 1997: Bradford Dukes
- 1997: Isle of Wight Islanders
- 2001, 2003, 2007: Eastbourne Eagles
- 2003: Hull Vikings
- 2005: Workington Comets
- 2005–2006: Poole Pirates
- 2006–2007: Mildenhall Fen Tigers

Sweden
- 1997: Getingarna
- 2000–2001: Vargarna

Individual honours
- 1999, 2000: British Championship finalist

Shaun James Tacey (born 27 November 1974) is a former motorcycle speedway rider from England.

== Speedway career ==
Tacey reached the final of the British Speedway Championship on two occasions in 1999 and 2000.

After beginning his career with Ipswich Witches, Tacey rode in the top tier of British Speedway from 1992 to 2008, riding for various clubs.

Tacey was signed by King's Lynn Stars for the 2004 Premier League speedway season, replacing Czech rider Jan Jaroš. The following season, Tacey rode with Workington Comets during the 2005 Premier League speedway season. In 2006, he joined Mildenhall Fen Tigers and rode for them for two years. He was made club captain during his time with the Fen Tigers.
