= 1991 Speedway Under-21 World Championship =

European motorcycle speedway event

World Under-21 Championship
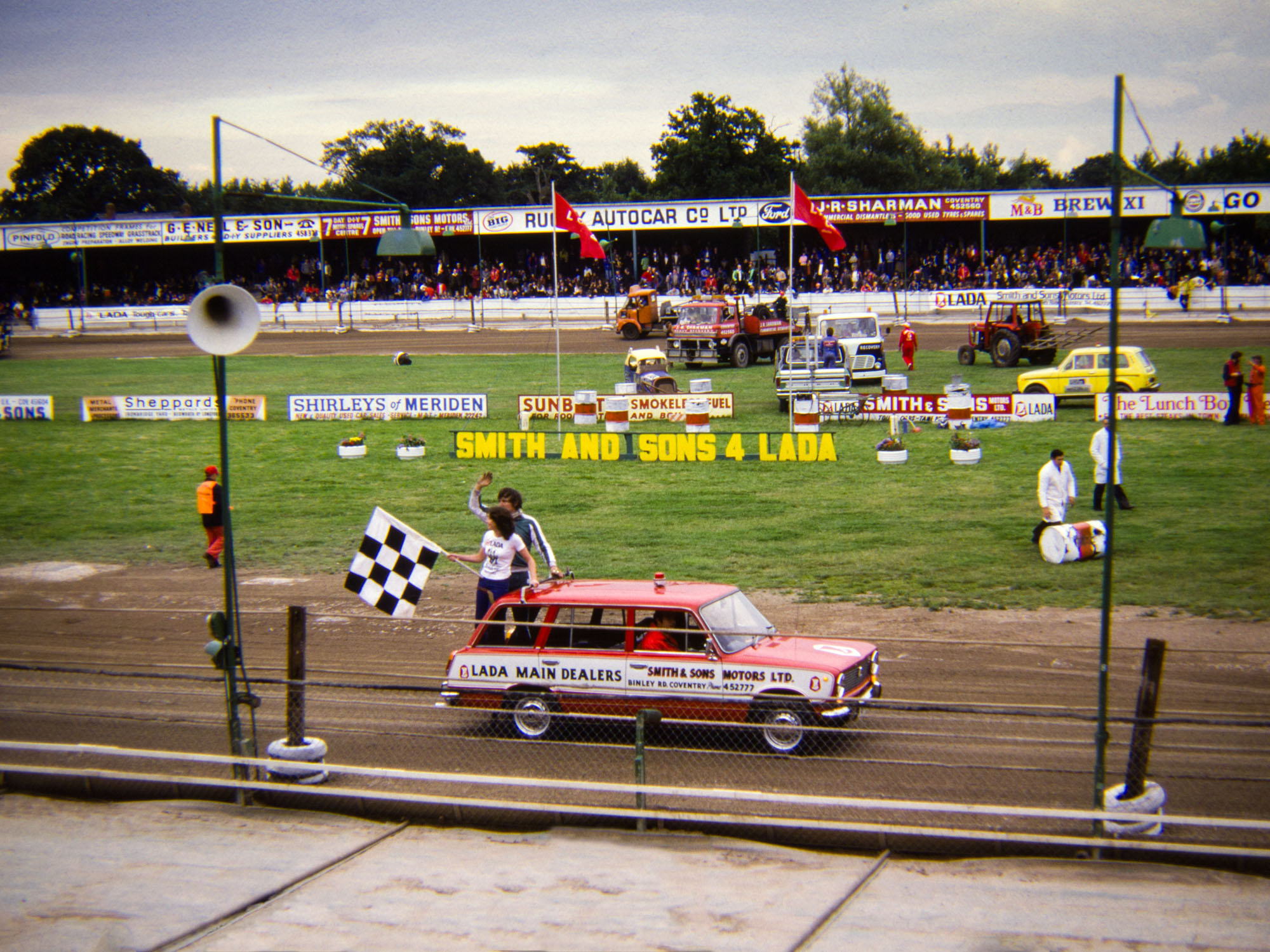
- Brandon Stadium in Coventry hosted the 1991 final
- Venue: Brandon Stadium
- Location: Coventry, England
- Start date: 30 September 1991

The 1991 Individual Speedway Junior World Championship was the 15th edition of the World motorcycle speedway Under-21 Championships.

Brian Andersen won the final, defeating fellow Dane Morten Andersen in a run-off for the title after both riders had finished on 14 points.

== Qualifying ==
- 17 May (East Germany) Meissen Speedway Stadium, Meissen
- 24 May (England) Belle Vue Stadium, Manchester
- 30 May (Sweden) Grevby Motorstadion, Mariestad
- 28 June (East Germany) Eichenring, Oberkrämer

== Semi-finals ==
- 12 July (Poland) The Swallow's Nest, Tarnów
- 12 July (Denmark) Brovst Speedway Center, Brovst

== World final ==
- 30 September 1991
- (England) Brandon Stadium, Coventry

Placing	Rider	Total	1	2	3	4	5	6	7	8	9	10	11	12	13	14	15	16	17	18	19	20	Pts	Pos	21
1	(Denmark) (10) Brian Andersen	14			3			2						3			3		3				14	1	3
2	(Denmark) (14) Morten Andersen	14				2		3					3		3							3	14	2	2
3	(Australia) (9) Jason Lyons	11			1		2						2					3		3			11	3	
4	(Australia) (15) Shane Parker	10				3			3			3						1	E				10	4	
5	(England) (1) Joe Screen	10	F				3				3				2				2				10	5	
6	(Denmark) (7) Jacob Olsen	9		3					2					2	0					2			9	6	
7	(Sweden) (13) Niklas Klingberg	8				0	1							1		3					3		8	7	
8	(Denmark) (16) Frede Schött	8				1				2	2						2			1			8	8	
9	(Sweden) (4) Joakim Karlsson	6	2							3				F				0				1	6	9	
10	(Soviet Union) (6) Viktor Gajdym	6		2				0			1							2			1		6	10	
11	(Sweden) (12) Jimmy Engman	6			2					1		0			1						2		6	11	
12	(Poland) (2) Piotr Paluch	5	3					1				1				0				0			5	12	
13	(Poland) (3) Robert Kużdżał	4	1						1				1				1				0		4	13	
14	(Poland) (5) Marek Hućko	3		1			0					2					E					0	3	14	
15	(Hungary) (8) Zsolt Böszermenyi	2		F						0			0			1			1				2	15	
16	(Poland) (11) Adam Łabędzki	0			0				X		-					-						-	0	16	
R1	(Poland) (R1) Jacek Rempała	2									0											2	2	R1	
R2	(England) (R2) Dean Barker	2														2							2	R2	
Placing	Rider	Total	1	2	3	4	5	6	7	8	9	10	11	12	13	14	15	16	17	18	19	20	Pts	Pos	21

m - exclusion for exceeding two minute time allowance • t - exclusion for touching the tapes • x - other exclusion • e - retired or mechanical failure • f - fell • ns - non-starter • nc - non-classify

gate A - inside	gate B	gate C	gate D - outside
