= Scott Smith (speedway rider) =

English speedway rider

- Born: 29 September 1972 (age 54); Sheffield, England
- Nationality: British (English)

Career history
- 1990–1995: Cradley Heathens
- 1996–1999, 2001–2003, 2009: Sheffield Tigers
- 2000, 2005, 2008: Berwick Bandits
- 2003: Exeter Falcons
- 2003: Stoke Potters
- 2008: Workington Comets

Individual honours
- 1997: British Championship finalist
- 1992: British Junior Champion

Team honours
- 1999: Premier League Four-Team Championship

Scott Anthony Smith (born 29 September 1972) is a former motorcycle speedway rider from England.

== Speedway career ==
Smith rode in the top tier of British Speedway from 1990 to 2009, riding for various clubs. He was crowned British Junior Champion in 1992.

In 1995, Smith was part of the Cradley Heathens four that won the Premier League Four-Team Championship, which was held on 6 August 1995, at the East of England Arena.

Smith reached the final of the British Speedway Championship in 1997. In 1999, he was part of the Sheffield four that won the Premier League Four-Team Championship, which was held on 29 August 1999, at the East of England Arena.
