= Zielona Góra Speedway Stadium =

Stadium in Zielona Góra, Poland

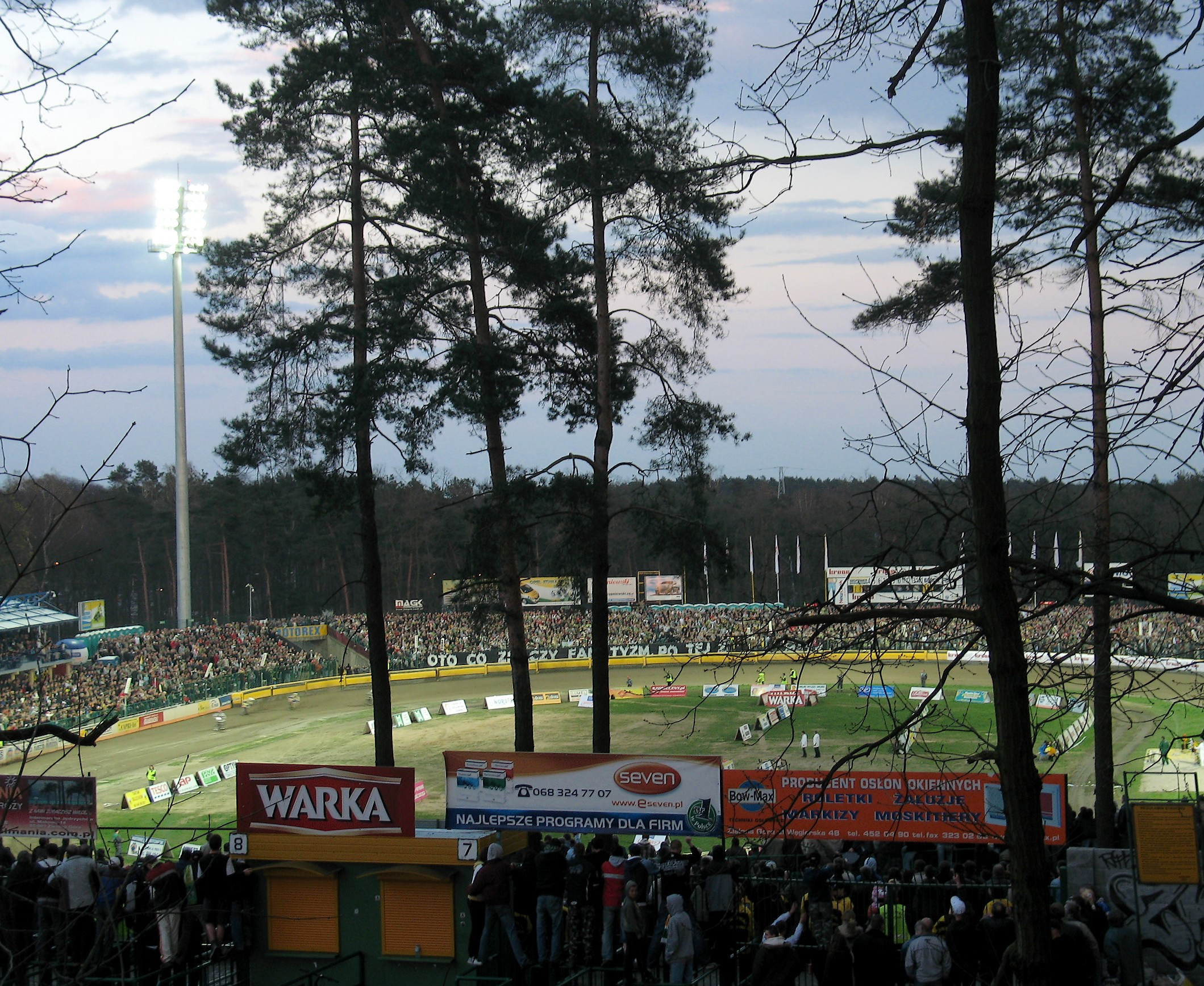
- A view of the stadium in 2008
- Location: Wrocławska 69, 65-218 Zielona Góra, Poland
- Coordinates: 51°55′45″N 15°31′46″E
- Capacity: 15,000
- Owner: City of Zielona Góra
- Opened: 5 June 1926
- Length: 0.340 km

The Zielona Góra Speedway Stadium (Polish: Stadion Żużlowy w Zielonej Górze) also known as the Swiss Krono Arena for sponsorship purposes is a 15,000-capacity motorcycle speedway stadium in southeast outskirts of Zielona Góra, Poland. The stadium is managed by the Municipal Sports and Recreation Center (MOSiR).

The venue is used by the speedway team Falubaz Zielona Góra, who compete in the Team Speedway Polish Championship.

== History ==
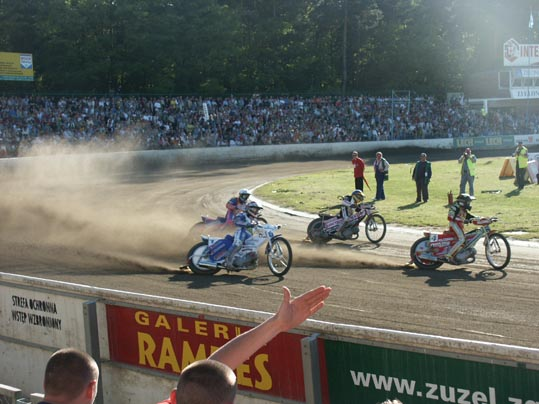
League racing at the stadium in 2004

The stadium opened on 5 June 1926, after being constructed by the Old Gymnastics Association (ATV - Alte Turn-Verein). Football and Speedway arrived at the stadium just after World War II during 1946. It was also during this period that Zielona Góra was restored as part of Poland, having previously been an area annexed by the Soviet Union.

The first significant renovation took place from 1956 to 1957 with the building of a full size speedway track and public seating. In 1963, improvements saw the arrival of new stands with the capacity increasing to 10,000.

In 2007, a covered stand was built which included a restaurant and three years later work started on the modernisation of the first bend stand. Other renovations having taken place during 2010 (construction of a stand) and in 2012.

Following the 2012 renovation of the track, the stadium took on the name the SPAR Arena following a sponsorship agreement with the SPAR franchise. The agreement upset the city because they owned the stadium and believed that they should be entitled to some of the monetary proceeds of the agreement.

In recent years sponsorship agreements followed for various other rights such as team naming and stadium naming. The sponsors included Stelmet, Swiss Krono (formerly Kronopol), Spar, Ekantor.pl, RM Solar and Marwis.pl. The stadium is currently called the Swiss Krono Arena.
