= Ritchie Hawkins =

English motorcycle speedway rider

- Born: 9 November 1983 (age 43); Peterborough, England

Career history
- 2000–2001: Sheffield Prowlers
- 2001–2003, 2006: Swindon Robins
- 2005: Peterborough Panthers
- 2004: Mildenhall Fen Tigers
- 2004: Berwick Bandits
- 2005, 2007, 2010: Somerset Rebels
- 2006: Workington Comets
- 2009: Scunthorpe Scorpions
- 2009: Sheffield Tigers
- 2010, 2013-2015: Ipswich Witches
- 2011, 2012: Rye House Rockets

Individual honours
- 2004: British Under 21 Champion

Team honours
- 2005: Premier League Fours Winner
- 2000, 2001, 2004: Conference League Champion
- 2004: Conference Trophy Winner
- 2004: Conference League KO Cup Winner

Ritchie Mark Hawkins (born 9 November 1983 in Peterborough, England), is a former motorcycle speedway rider from England.

== Career ==
In 2004, Hawkins became British Under 21 Champion and has represented Great Britain at Under-21 level. The following season in 2005, he was part of the Somerset Rebels four who won the Premier League Four-Team Championship, held on 20 August 2005, at Derwent Park.

In 2006, Hawkins suffered severe bruising to the brain following a track crash at Workington, forcing him to miss the rest of that season.

A crash during a pre-season indoor meeting in Kiel, Germany during 2008, resulted in multiple injuries, including fractures to his right ankle, both wrists, broken arm, shattered femur, and internal injuries. He made a track return the following year.

Hawkins' racing career ended during the 2015 season, while captaining the Ipswich Witches. Broken ribs suffered on the opening night and a loss of form contributed to his leaving the side halfway through the year. At the end of that season, it was announced that Hawkins would be returning to the club as the new team manager.

As of 2023, Hawkins remains as team manager of Ipswich.

== Family ==
Hawkins' father Kevin was also a professional speedway rider and team manager.
