= Chris Neath =

British motorcycle speedway rider

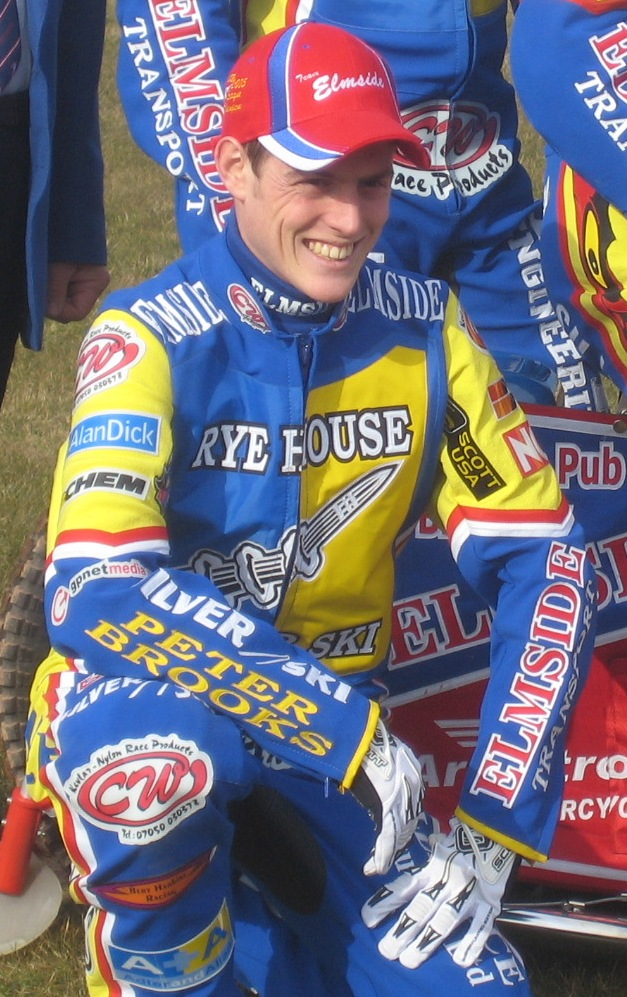
- Born: 29 January 1982 (age 44); Worcester, Worcestershire England
- Nationality: British (English)

Career history

Great Britain
- 1998–2001: Newport
- 2002–2003: Swindon
- 2004–2012: Rye House
- 2002, 2003, 2004, 2008: Wolverhampton
- 2007, 2010: Lakeside
- 2007: Reading
- 2009: Poole

Sweden
- 2001: Norbaggarna

Team honours
- 2002: Elite League (tier 1) champion
- 2005, 2007: Premier League (tier 2) champion
- 1999, 2005: Premier Trophy (tier 2) winner
- 2003: Fours (tier 2) winner
- 1999: Conference League (tier 3) champion

Christopher Maurice Neath (born 29 January 1982) is a former motorcycle speedway rider from England. He earned one international cap for the Great Britain national speedway team.

== Career ==
Neath began riding when competing in youth grasstrack competitions, winning numerous ACU Championship titles, British, National and Best Pairs.

Neath first began riding league speedway for the Newport Mavericks during the 1998 Speedway Conference League. The following season, he captained the Mavericks to the league title, in addition to riding for the Newport Wasps senior team in the Premier League and winning the Premier Trophy with them. In 2001, Neath also ventured to Sweden riding to a 10.68 point average for Norbaggarna.

In 2002, Neath moved to Premier league rivals, the Swindon Robins. He spent two seasons at Swindon and at this time he was also 'doubling up' with the club that owned his contract, the Wolverhampton Wolves. This was quite a successful time for Neath. He won the Elite League title with Wolves in 2002 and the Premier League Four Team Championship with the Robins in 2003.

Neath moved to the Rye House Rockets in 2004 and helped them complete and League and Premier Trophy double in 2005. The following season in 2006, he suffered several injuries but was captain of the 2007 side that won the Premier League title. Neath continued to captain the Rockets for several years.

In 2008, having been a ten-year asset of the Wolverhampton Wolves, Neath was awarded a testimonial meeting held at the Rye House Speedway, where he finished in third place behind Fredrik Lindgren and Tai Woffinden. He represented Great Britain racing at Under-19, Under-21 and senior level.

An injury in the opening match of the 2012 season saw Neath out of speedway for the rest of the season and he subsequently retired.
