= Gary Havelock =

British motorcycle speedway rider (born 1968)

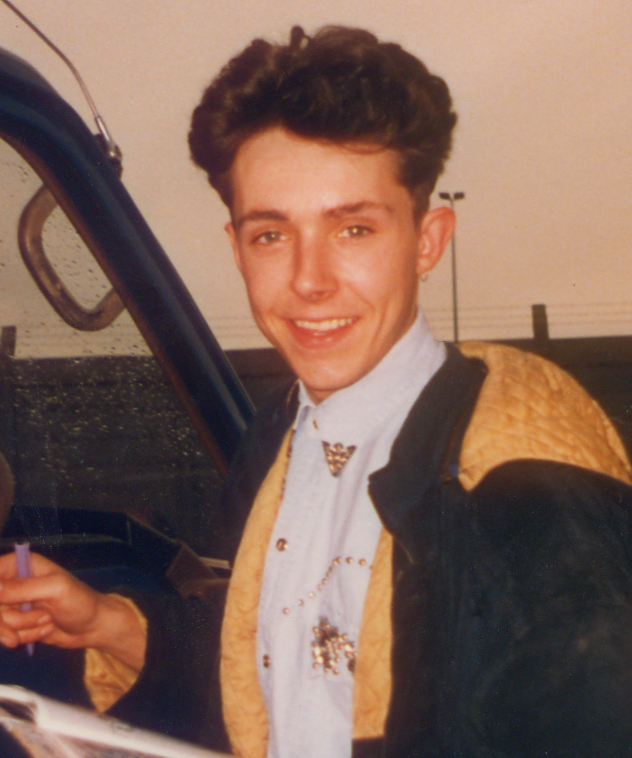
- Havelock in 1988
- Born: 4 November 1968 (age 58); Eaglescliffe, England

Career history

Great Britain
- 1985–1986: Middlesbrough Tigers
- 1985: King's Lynn Stars
- 1986–1988, 1990–1997: Bradford Dukes
- 1998: Eastbourne Eagles
- 1998–2002: Poole Pirates
- 2003–2004: Peterborough Panthers
- 2005: Arena Essex Hammers
- 2006–2012: Redcar Bears

Poland
- 1992, 1996: Gorzów
- 1998: Częstochowa
- 2000: Rzeszów
- 2001–2003, 2005: Piła

Sweden
- 1994–1995: Indianerna
- 1999: Filbyterna
- 2000–2003: Masarna

Individual honours
- 1992: World Champion
- 1986: British Under 21 Champion
- 1987: European Under-21 Champion
- 1991, 1992: British Champion
- 1992, 1995: South African Champion
- 1995: Premier League Riders Champion
- 1992: Overseas Champion

Team honours
- 1997: Elite League Champion
- 2000: Swedish Elitserien Champion
- 1991, 1992, 1993, 1995: British KO Cup Winner
- 2007: Young Shield Winner
- 1985: National League Fours Winner

Robert Gary Havelock (born 4 November 1968) is a British former speedway rider who was World Champion in 1992.

== Career ==
Havelock's father was speedway rider Brian Havelock. Gary Havelock first competed in grasstrack racing, winning the British Junior Championship, before following his father into speedway. Havelock showed his potential early in his speedway career, winning the Suffolk Open Championship at Mildenhall as a 16-year-old in 1984, only two weeks after qualifying for a licence.

Havelock started his league career with local club Middlesbrough Tigers (the team managed by his father) in 1985, moving from reserve to the main body of the team by May. He helped Middlesbrough win the Fours Championship during the 1985 National League season.

Havelock moved to the Bradford Dukes in 1987, the same year that he won the 1987 Individual Speedway Junior European Championship (this would be the final year that it would be called the European Championship as it became the World Under-21 Championship from 1988). He stayed with Bradford for next ten seasons.

The highlight of Havelock's career was when he won the World Championship in 1992 at the Olympic Stadium in Wrocław, Poland. Havelock, the first British World Champion since Michael Lee in 1980, finished three points clear of 1990 World Champion Per Jonsson of Sweden, and four in front of Dane Gert Handberg

Havelock won the Premier League Riders Championship at Odsal Stadium on 14 October 1995 but missed most of the 1996 season after seriously injuring his back whilst representing England in a test match against Australia at Poole in July. Havelock had ridden in the first two of the Speedway Grand Prix meetings that season.

Havelock has also represented Great Britain in the Speedway World Team Cup finals six times, finishing runner-up in 1990 and in the Speedway World Cup four times, finishing runner-up in 2004.

The 1998 season, was spent with the Eastbourne Eagles and this was followed by five seasons with the Poole Pirates until 2003. During this time, Havelock also spent the 1986/87 and 1988/89 seasons in Australia based at the North Arm Speedway in Adelaide.

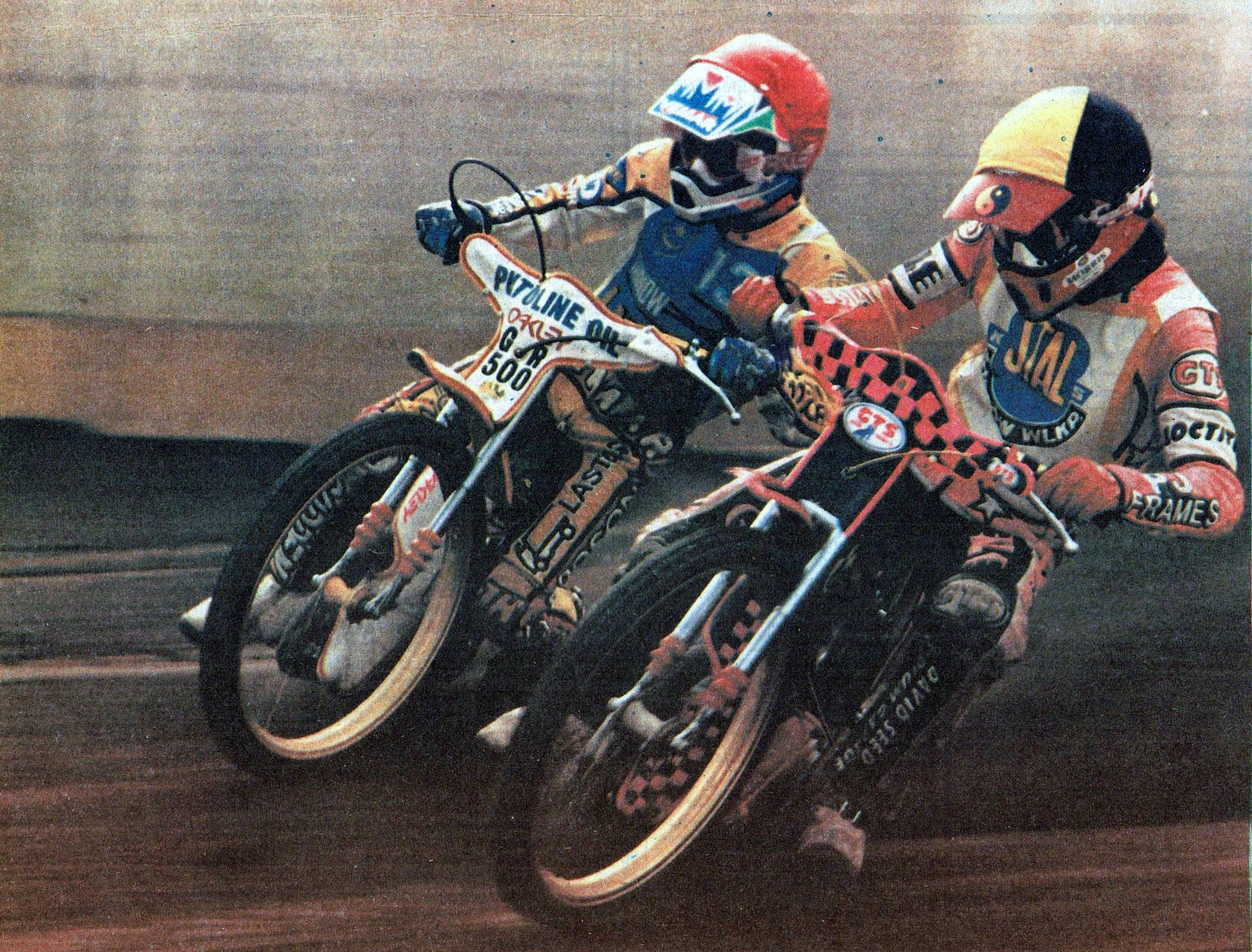
Havelock (right) battles with Gert Handberg in the Polish league

Havelock's 2012 season was ended early by a crash in March in which he was hit by Derek Sneddon's bike, resulting in a broken collarbone, a broken arm, and broken ribs.

As a consequence of the injuries to his arm, Havelock announced his retirement from speedway on 22 February 2013. A week later he was named as the new team manager of Coventry Bees.

== Off track ==
Havelock was banned for the entire 1989 season after he tested positive for cannabis at the British League Riders' Championship meeting in 1988.

At the 2007 BSPA Annual General Meeting, Great Britain team manager Neil Middleditch announced that he would be "happy to continue" in the position but recommended that Havelock should be his successor once he has retired from racing, stating "he would take to it like a duck to water". Middleditch also mentioned he would be happy for Havelock to act as his assistant.

Havelock appeared in the Sky TV football show Premier League All Stars in 2007, representing eventual winners Middlesbrough F.C.

Havelock is a patron of the charity National Association for Bikers with a Disability.

== World final appearances ==
=== Individual World Championship ===
- 1992 - (Poland) Wrocław, Olympic Stadium - Winner - 14pts
- 1993 - (Germany) Pocking, Rottalstadion - 6th - 10pts

=== World Pairs Championship ===
- 1992 - (Italy) Lonigo, Pista Speedway (with Kelvin Tatum / Martin Dugard) - 2nd - 23pts (15+2)
- 1993 - (Denmark) Vojens, Vojens Speedway Center (with Joe Screen / Martin Dugard) - 4th - 17pts (0)

=== World Team Cup ===
- 1988 - (United States) Long Beach, Veterans Memorial Stadium (with Simon Wigg / Simon Cross / Kelvin Tatum / Chris Morton) - 4th - 22pts (8)
- 1990 - (Czech Republic) Pardubice, Svítkov Stadion (with Kelvin Tatum / Simon Wigg / Jeremy Doncaster / Marvyn Cox) - 2nd - 34pts (5)
- 1991 - (Denmark) Vojens, Vojens Speedway Center (with Marvyn Cox / Martin Dugard / Chris Louis / Paul Thorp) - 4th - 11pts (3)
- 1992 - (Sweden) Kumla, Kumla Speedway (with Mark Loram / Joe Screen / Martin Dugard / Kelvin Tatum) - 3rd - 31pts (7)
- 1993 - (England) Coventry, Brandon Stadium (with Kelvin Tatum / Martin Dugard / Joe Screen / Chris Louis) - 4th - 14pts (4)
- 1994 - (Germany) Brokstedt, Holsteinring Brokstedt (with Mark Loram / Chris Louis) - 7th - 16pts (3)

=== World Cup ===
- 2003 - (Denmark) Vojens, Vojens Speedway Center (with Dean Barker / David Norris / Lee Richardson / Scott Nicholls) - 5th - 44pts (3)
- 2004 - (England) Poole, Poole Stadium (with David Norris / Lee Richardson / Mark Loram / Scott Nicholls) - 2nd - 48pts (9)

=== Individual Under-21 World Championship ===
- 1987 - (Poland) Zielona Góra, Zielona Góra Speedway Stadium - Winner - 13pts

== Speedway Grand Prix results ==
Year	Position	Points	Best Finish	Notes
1995	13th	45	7th	
1996	16th	27	6th	
