= Joe Screen =

British international motorcycle speedway rider

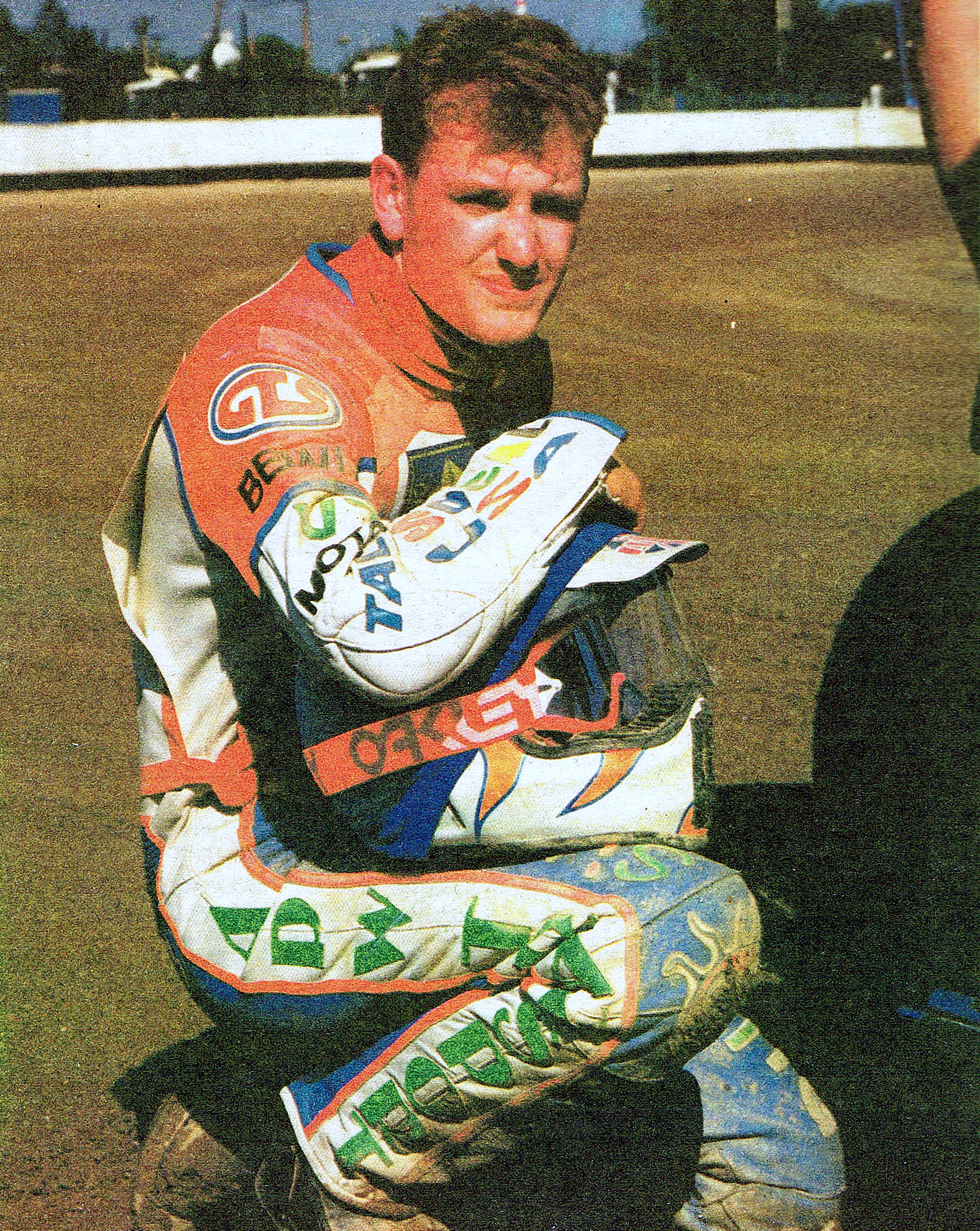
- Born: 27 November 1972 (age 53); Chesterfield, England
- Nationality: British (English)

Career history

Great Britain
- 1989–1993, 1998, 2003–2008: Belle Vue Aces
- 1994–1997: Bradford Dukes
- 1999: Hull Vikings
- 2000–2003: Eastbourne Eagles
- 2009: Poole Pirates
- 2010: Wolverhampton Wolves
- 2010–2013: Glasgow Tigers
- 2011, 2012: Birmingham Brummies
- 2013: Coventry Bees

Poland
- 1992, 1994–1997: Częstochowa
- 1993: Tarnów
- 1998–1999: Rzeszów
- 2000: Bydgoszcz
- 2002: Gorzów
- 2003: Piła
- 2004: Ostrów

Sweden
- 1993–1994: Getingarna
- 1996–2002: Dackarna/Team Svelux/Luxo Stars
- 2003: Valsarna
- 2004–2006, 2009: Vargarna

Individual honours
- 1993: World Under 21 Champion
- 1990, 1993: British Under 21 Champion
- 1992: British League Riders' Champion
- 1996, 2004: British Champion

Team honours
- 1992: Elite League Four-Team
- 1993: British League Champion
- 1995, 2002, 2005: Elite League KO Cup
- 1997, 2000: Elite League Champion

Joseph Screen (born 27 November 1972 in Chesterfield, Derbyshire), is a former British international motorcycle speedway rider. His major speedway honours include winning the World Under-21 Championship in 1993, the British Championship in 1996 and 2004, and the British League Riders' Championship in 1992. He earned 37 international caps for the England national speedway team and seven caps for the Great Britain team.

== Career ==
Screen began riding motorcycles at the age of four, and gained his early experience on a 50cc motocross bike. After competing in motocross and grasstrack he started to compete in speedway at the age of fourteen. Screen left home aged just 16 and would be riding at the highest level aged 17.

Screen started his speedway career with the Belle Vue Aces in 1989 in the top tier of British League racing. He soon became a top rider and made his debut for the England team in 1991.

In August 1992, Screen won the bronze medal at the 1992 Speedway Under-21 World Championship, which left him disappointed because he had high hopes of winning the event. However, he gained consolation by winning the British League Riders' Championship held at Odsal Stadium on 3 October 1992.

The following year in 1993, Screen made up for his 1992 U21 defeat by winning the 1993 Individual Speedway Junior World Championship. He was still eligible for the championship because he was 20 years of age.

In 1994, Screen transferred to the Bradford Dukes, where he spent the next four seasons. Screen won his first of two British Speedway Championships in 1996. He also rode in the Speedway Grand Prix series between 1996 until 2001 (when he had to withdraw after breaking his thigh) and as a wild card in the British Grand Prix in 2002, appearing in 21 Grands Prix and scoring a total of 159 points.

A year back at Belle Vue Aces as club captain in 1998, was followed by a solitary season with the Hull Vikings. The next four seasons were spent with the Eastbourne Eagles before returning 'home' to Belle Vue in 2003, and enjoying a testimonial season the following year. Screen became British Champion again in 2004.

After being released by Belle Vue following the 2008 season, Screen joined Elite League champions the Poole Pirates on loan for 2009, after losing 27 lbs in response to concerns over his weight. Despite improving his average over the season, he was not retained by Poole. After failing to get an Elite League offer, he agreed a two-year deal with Premier League Glasgow Tigers, but an appeal against his converted 12-point greensheet average was turned down, almost forcing him to retire. He was given a lifeline with a short-term deal with Wolverhampton Wolves for 2010, until Adam Skornicki returned from injury. His spell with Wolves saw his average drop sufficiently to fit into the Glasgow Tigers team, which he joined in May 2010, signing as a club asset for 2011, when he captained Glasgow to win both the Premier League Championship and the Premier League Pairs (alongside James Grieves). He also rode for Birmingham Brummies in the Elite League in 2011 and 2012 in a doubling-up capacity. In 2013, he rode for Coventry Bees in the Elite League as cover for the injured Adam Roynon, but after getting injured himself, his tenure there was short-lived.

Screen rode in the Polish leagues from 1992 to 2007 for various clubs in the Team Speedway Polish Championship. His most successful spell was with Włókniarz Częstochowa and was part of the team that won the league title during the 1996 Polish speedway season.

Screen has also been involved in coaching young speedway riders and ran an academy at Buxton.

Screen also competed in grasstrack and longtrack motorcycle racing. His grasstrack career included winning both the British 350cc Championship and the British 350cc Best Pairs in 1989, reaching the World Longtrack Final in 1993 and 1994, and British Masters Championship wins in 1992 and 1995.

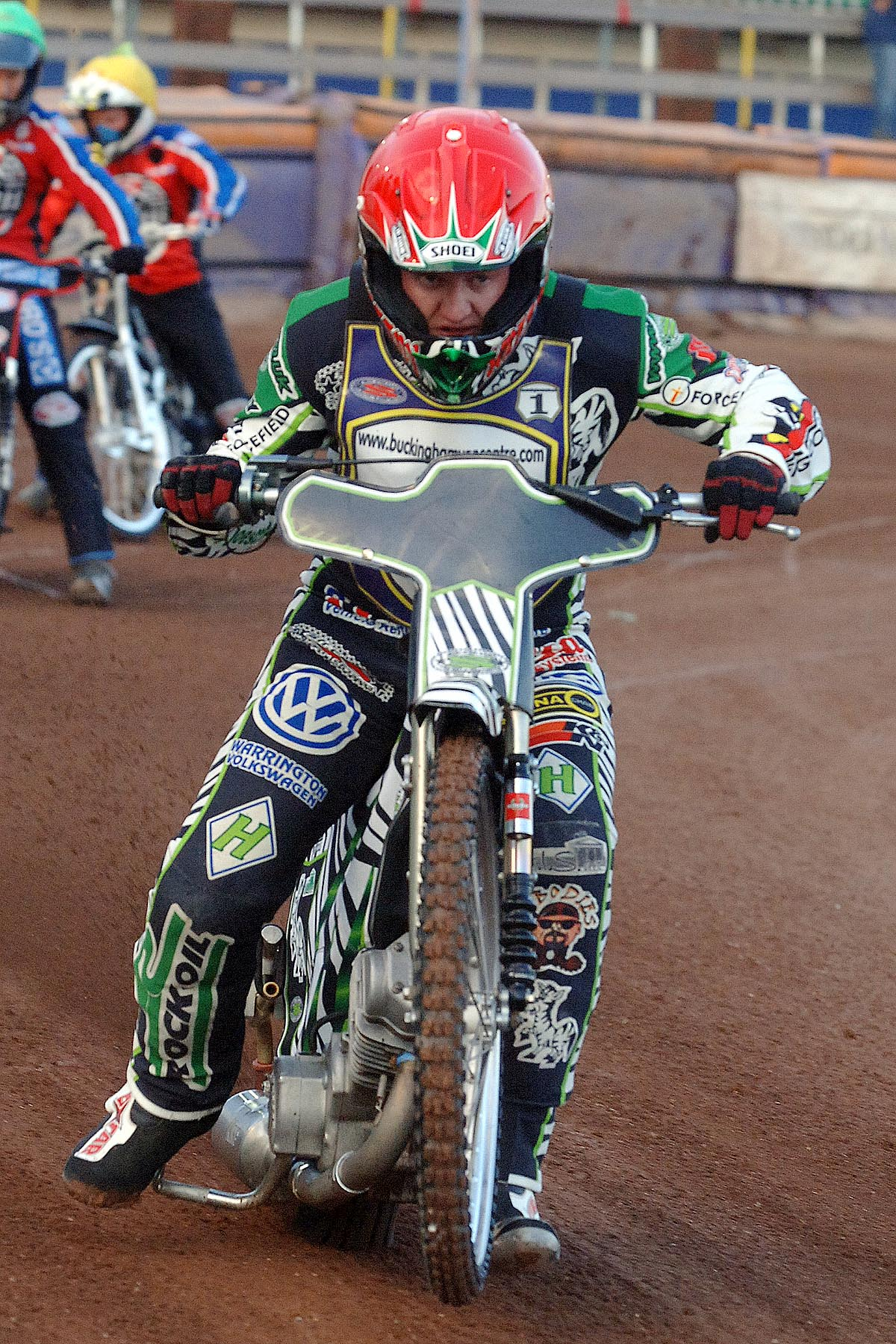
Screen riding during 2007

Screen announced in June 2013 that he would be retiring from racing at the end of the season after 25 years in British league speedway, but a hand injury sustained in August brought his season to a premature end.

== Retirement ==
After retiring from speedway, Screen opened the Daresbury Boarding Kennels, which he owns with his wife Lindsay.

== World Final Appearances ==
=== Individual World Championship ===
- 1993 - (Germany) Pocking, Rottalstadion - 13th - 5pts

=== World Pairs Championship ===
- 1993 - (Denmark) Vojens, Speedway Center (with Martin Dugard / Gary Havelock) - 4th - 17pts (9)

=== World Team Cup ===
- 1992 - (Sweden) Kumla, Kumla Speedway - 3rd - 31pts (2)
- 1993 - (England) Coventry, Brandon Stadium - 4th - 14pts (5)
- 1999 - (Czech Republic) Pardubice, Svítkova Stadion - 4th - 29+2pts (4+2)
- 2000 - (England) Coventry, Brandon Stadium - 2nd - 40+0pts (12)

=== World Cup ===
- 2005 - (Poland) Wrocław, Olympic Stadium - 4th - 25pts (1)

=== Individual Under-21 World Championship ===
- 1991 - (England) Coventry, Brandon Stadium - 5th - 10pts
- 1992 - (Germany) Pfaffenhofen, Speedway Stadion Pfaffenhofen - 3rd - 13pts
- 1993 - (Czech Republic) Pardubice, Svítkova Stadion - Winner - 14+3pts

== Speedway Grand Prix results ==
Year	Position	Points	Best Finish	Notes
1996	13th	38	8th	
1997	19th	8	8th	
1998	27th	5	12th	
1999	6th	68	4th	
2000	16th	34	10th	
2002	29th	6	10th	

== World Longtrack Championship ==
Finalist

- 1993 - (Germany) Muhldorf - 11th (9pts)
- 1994 - (Czech Republic) Marianske Lazne - 12th (8pts)

Grand-Prix

- 2000 - 16th (20pts) 1 app

== British Masters Grasstrack Championship ==
First

- 1992 (England) @ Wimborne & North Berks
- 1995 (England) @ North Berks & Severn Valley
- 2003 (England) @ Astra grasstrack

Second

- 1999 (England) @ North Berks
- 2002 (England) @ Wainfleet
