= List of Russians in the Team Speedway Polish Championship =

Competitors from Russia in the Team Speedway Polish Championship.

Names in alphabetical order
| Name | Club | Year |
|---|---|---|
| (Russia) Ilya Bondarenko, born 1982 | Lokomotiv Daugavpils | 2007–2008 |
| (Russia) Aleksey Kharchenko, born 1985 | GTŻ Grudziądz | 2006 |
| (Russia) Aleksey Kharchenko, born 1985 | TŻ Lublin | 2007 |
| (Russia) Grigory Kharchenko, born 1959 | Polonia Piła | 1992–1993 |
| (Russia) Grigory Kharchenko, born 1959 | Apator Toruń | 1995 |
| (Russia) Grigory Kharchenko, born 1959 | Unia Tarnów | 2001 |
| (Russia) Anatoly Khlynov, born 1971 | KKŻ Krosno | 1995 |
| (Russia) Anatoly Khlynov, born 1971 | Ukraina Rivne | 2006 |
| (Russia) Sergey Czekmariov, born 1970 | ŻKS Krosno | 1999 |
| (Russia) Sergey Darkin, born 1973 | Iskra Ostrów Wielkopolski | 1996 |
| (Russia) Sergey Darkin, born 1973 | RKM Rybnik | 1997 |
| (Russia) Sergey Darkin, born 1973 | Wanda Kraków | 1998 |
| (Russia) Sergey Darkin, born 1973 | Iskra Ostrów Wielkopolski | 1999 |
| (Russia) Sergey Darkin, born 1973 | Stal Rzeszów | 2000 |
| (Russia) Sergey Darkin, born 1973 | GKM Grudziądz | 2001 |
| (Russia) Sergey Darkin, born 1973 | Unia Tarnów | 2002–2003 |
| (Russia) Sergey Darkin, born 1973 | Speedway Center Daugavpils | 2006 |
| (Russia) Sergey Darkin, born 1973 | Start Gniezno | 2007 |
| (Russia) Sergey Darkin, born 1973 | Lokomotiv Daugavpils | 2008 |
| (Russia) Sergey Darkin, born 1973 | Speedway Miskolc | 2009 |
| (Russia) Igor Dubinin | Kolejarz Opole | 1992 |
| (Russia) Vladimir Dubinin, born 1976 | Śląsk Świętochłowice | 2002 |
| (Russia) Vladimir Dubinin, born 1976 | SKA Speedway Lviv | 2004 |
| (Russia) Vladimir Dubinin, born 1976 | Ukraina Rivne | 2006 |
| (Russia) Vladimir Dubinin, born 1976 | Speedway Miskolc | 2008 |
| (Russia) Kirill Filinov, born 1986 | Speedway Center Daugavpils | 2006 |
| (Russia) Kirill Filinov, born 1986 | Ukraina Rivne | 2008 |
| (Russia) Kirill Filinov, born 1986 | KMŻ Lublin | 2009 |
| (Russia) Sergey Filjuszyn, born 1976 | Speedway Center Daugavpils | 2006 |
| (Russia) Renat Gafurov, born 1982 | Kolejarz Rawicz | 2003 |
| (Russia) Renat Gafurov, born 1982 | RKM Rybnik | 2006–2007 |
| (Russia) Renat Gafurov, born 1982 | Wybrzeże Gdańsk | 2008–2009 |
| (Russia) Talgat Galeev, born 1962 | ŁTŻ Łódź | 1999 |
| (Russia) Marat Gatjatov, born 1985 | KSM Krosno | 2007 |
| (Russia) Marat Gatjatov, born 1985 | Orzeł Łódź | 2008–2009 |
| (Russia) Ruslan Gatjatov, born 1985 | Orzeł Łódź | 2006 |
| (Russia) Ruslan Gatjatov, born 1985 | Lokomotiv Daugavpils | 2007 |
| (Russia) Ruslan Gatjatov, born 1985 | Orzeł Łódź | 2008–2009 |
| (Russia) Denis Gizatulin, born 1983 | Speedway Center Daugavpils | 2005 |
| (Russia) Denis Gizatulin, born 1983 | RKM Rybnik | 2006–2009 |
| (Russia) Viktor Golubowskij, born 1985 | Kolejarz Rawicz | 2009 |
| (Russia) Alex Guzajev, born 1986 | GTŻ Grudziądz (borrowed from Kolejarz Rawicz) | 2007 |
| (Russia) Alex Guzajev, born 1986 | Ukraina Rivne | 2008 |
| (Russia) Alex Guzajev, born 1986 | Kolejarz Rawicz | 2009 |
| (Russia) Georgij Iszutin, born 1985 | Lokomotiv Daugavpils | 2007 |
| (Russia) Daniil Ivanov, born 1986 | Ukraina Rivne | 2006 |
| (Russia) Daniil Ivanov, born 1986 | Unia Tarnów | 2007 |
| (Russia) Roman Ivanov, born 1984 | Lokomotiv Daugavpils | 2007–2008 |
| (Russia) Sergey Jeroszin, born 1973 | Śląsk Świętochłowice | 2000 |
| (Russia) Sergey Jeroszin, born 1973 | ŻKS Krosno | 2001 |
| (Russia) Sergey Jeroszin, born 1973 | KSŻ Krosno | 2002 |
| (Russia) Sergey Jeroszin, born 1973 | KSŻ Krosno | 2006 |
| (Russia) Maksim Kalimulin, born 1984 | Ukraina Rivne | 2006 |
| (Russia) Maksim Karajczencew, born 1984 | KSŻ Krosno | 2006 |
| (Russia) Aleksander Kosołapkin, born 1987 | Speedway Center Daugavpils | 2006 |
| (Russia) Aleksander Kosołapkin, born 1987 | ZKŻ Zielona Góra | 2008 |
| (Russia) Oleg Kurguskin, born 1966 | Iskra Ostrów Wielkopolski | 1999–2001 |
| (Russia) Oleg Kurguskin, born 1966 | Speedway Center Daugavpils | 2006–2007 |
| (Russia) Sergey Kuzin, born 1971 | Kolejarz Rawicz | 2000–2001 |
| (Russia) Artem Laguta, born 1990 | Lokomotiv Daugavpils | 2007–2009 |
| (Russia) Grigory Laguta, born 1984 | Speedway Center Daugavpils | 2006 |
| (Russia) Grigory Laguta, born 1984 | Lokomotiv Daugavpils | 2007–2009 |
| (Russia) Rinat Mardanshin, (1963–2005) | Unia Tarnów | 1992 |
| (Russia) Rinat Mardanshin, (1963–2005) | Śląsk Świętochłowice | 1995–1996 |
| (Russia) Rinat Mardanshin, (1963–2005) | Iskra Ostrów Wielkopolski | 1997 |
| (Russia) Rinat Mardanshin, (1963–2005) | Włókniarz Częstochowa | 1998 |
| (Russia) Rinat Mardanshin, (1963–2005) | Iskra Ostrów Wielkopolski | 1999 |
| (Russia) Rinat Mardanshin, (1963–2005) | TŻ Opole | 2000 |
| (Russia) Rinat Mardanshin, (1963–2005) | WKM Warszawa | 2001 |
| (Russia) Rinat Mardanshin, (1963–2005) | Iskra Ostrów Wielkopolski | 2002 |
| (Russia) Lenar Nigmatzjanow, born 1985 | Wybrzeże Gdańsk (borrowed from KS Toruń) | 2006 |
| (Russia) Lenar Nigmatzjanow, born 1985 | TŻ Lublin | 2007 |
| (Russia) Lenar Nigmatzjanow, born 1985 | Ukraina Rivne | 2008 |
| (Russia) Lenar Nigmatzjanow, born 1985 | KSM Krosno | 2009 |
| (Russia) (Poland) Roman Povazhny, born 1976; He received Polish citizenship in the mid-2003, as a national player | ŻKS Krosno | 1998 |
| (Russia) (Poland) Roman Povazhny, born 1976; He received Polish citizenship in the mid-2003, as a national player | Stal Gorzów Wielkopolski | 1999 |
| (Russia) (Poland) Roman Povazhny, born 1976; He received Polish citizenship in the mid-2003, as a national player | WKM Warszawa | 2001 |
| (Russia) (Poland) Roman Povazhny, born 1976; He received Polish citizenship in the mid-2003, as a national player | GKM Grudziądz | 2002 |
| (Russia) (Poland) Roman Povazhny, born 1976; He received Polish citizenship in the mid-2003, as a national player | RKM Rybnik | 2003–2007 |
| (Russia) (Poland) Roman Povazhny, born 1976; He received Polish citizenship in the mid-2003, as a national player | Stal Rzeszów | 2008 |
| (Russia) (Poland) Roman Povazhny, born 1976; He received Polish citizenship in the mid-2003, as a national player | Lokomotiv Daugavpils | 2009 |
| (Russia) Rif Saitgareev, (1960–1996) | Iskra Ostrów Wielkopolski | 1994 |
| (Russia) Rif Saitgareev, (1960–1996) | ZKŻ Zielona Góra | 1995 |
| (Russia) Rif Saitgareev, (1960–1996) | Iskra Ostrów Wielkopolski | 1996 |
| (Russia) Denis Saifutdinov, born 1981 | Speedway Center Daugavpils | 2005–2006 |
| (Russia) Denis Saifutdinov, born 1981 | Polonia Bydgoszcz | 2008 |
| (Russia) Denis Saifutdinov, born 1981 | Orzeł Łódź | 2009 |
| (Russia) Emil Sayfutdinov, born 1989; He received Polish citizenship in the mid-2003, as a national player | Polonia Bydgoszcz | 2006–2009 |
| (Russia) Mikhail Starostin, born 1953 | Śląsk Świętochłowice | 1992 |
| (Russia) Mikhail Starostin, born 1953 | Wanda Kraków | 1993–1995 |
| (Russia) Mikhail Starostin, born 1953 | LKŻ Lublin | 1996 |
| (Russia) Eduard Shaihullin, born 1974 | TŻ Lublin | 2001–2002 |
| (Russia) Artem Szczepin, born 1987 | Kolejarz Rawicz | 2007 |
| (Russia) Artem Szczepin, born 1987 | Start Gniezno | 2008 |
| (Russia) Simon Vlasov, born 1981 | Ukraina Rivne | 2005 |
| (Russia) Simon Vlasov, born 1981 | Speedway Center Daugavpils | 2006 |
| (Russia) Simon Vlasov, born 1981 | KSM Krosno | 2007 |
| (Russia) Simon Vlasov, born 1981 | Kolejarz Rawicz | 2008 |
| (Russia) Simon Vlasov, born 1981 | Speedway Miskolc | 2009 |
| (Russia) Artem Vodyakov, born 1991 | ZKŻ Zielona Góra | 2008–2009 |
| (Russia) Oleg Volochov | Kolejarz Opole | 1992 |
