= European Pairs Speedway Championship Classification =

The table below is a medal classified table of every motorcycle speedway rider to have finished in the top three of a European Pairs Speedway Championship competition, between 2004 and 2014. In total, 61 different riders from 9 national teams have a European Pairs Championship medal(s). Aleš Dryml, Jr. and Lukáš Dryml hold the record with six medals (four gold and two silver) each.

== Classification ==
Pos	Rider	Team	Total	Gold	Silver	Bronze
1.	Aleš Dryml, Jr.	Czech Republic	6	4	2	
	Lukáš Dryml	Czech Republic	6	4	2	
3.	Sebastian Ułamek	Poland	4	2	2	
4.	Matěj Kůs	Czech Republic	2	2		
5.	Martin Smolinski	Germany	2	1	1	
	Bohumil Brhel	Czech Republic	2	1	1	
	Adam Skórnicki	Poland	2	1	1	
8.	Andriy Karpov	Ukraine	2	1		1
	Oleksandr Loktaev	Ukraine	2	1		1
	Stanislav Melnichuk	Ukraine	2	1		1
	Robert Kościecha	Poland	2	1		1
12.	Václav Milík, Jr.	Czech Republic	1	1		
	Eduard Krčmář	Czech Republic	1	1		
	Tomáš Suchánek	Czech Republic	1	1		
	Kevin Wölbert	Germany	1	1		
	Max Dilger	Germany	1	1		
	Jarosław Hampel	Poland	1	1		
	Przemysław Pawlicki	Poland	1	1		
	Piotr Pawlicki Jr.	Poland	1	1		
	Wiesław Jaguś	Poland	1	1		
	Krzysztof Kasprzak	Poland	1	1		
	Janusz Kołodziej	Poland	1	1		
	Marcin Rempała	Poland	1	1		
	Zdeněk Simota	Czech Republic	1	1		
	Karol Ząbik	Poland	1	1		
26.	Renat Gafurov	Russia	5		2	3
27.	Norbert Magosi	Hungary	2		1	1
–	Matej Žagar	Slovenia	2		1	1
	Izak Šantej	Slovenia	2		1	1
30.	Damian Baliński	Poland	1		1	
	Adrian Miedziński	Poland	1		1	
	Norbert Kościuch	Poland	1		1	
	Mariusz Puszakowski	Poland	1		1	
	Andžejs Ļebedevs	Latvia	1		1	
	Ķasts Puodžuks	Latvia	1		1	
	Jozsef Tabaka	Hungary	1		1	
	Tobias Kroner	Germany	1		1	
	Roberto Haupt	Germany	1		1	
	Sławomir Drabik	Poland	1		1	
	Siergiej Filiushin	Russia	1		1	
	Krzysztof Jabłoński	Poland	1		1	
	Jernej Kolenko	Slovenia	1		1	
	Artem Laguta	Russia	1		1	
	Grigory Laguta	Russia	1		1	
	Adrian Rymel	Czech Republic	1		1	
	Simon Vlasov	Russia	1		1	
47.	Denis Gizatullin	Russia	2			2
48.	Vitaliy Belousov	Russia	1			1
	Kenni Larsson	Denmark	1			1
	Peter Kildemand	Denmark	1			1
	Victor Golubovsky	Russia	1			1
	Jurica Pavlic	Croatia	1			1
	Dino Kovačić	Croatia	1			1
	Aleksiej Charczenko	Russia	1			1
	Tomasz Gapiński	Poland	1			1
	Ronnie Jamroży	Poland	1			1
	Daniel Jeleniewski	Poland	1			1
	Robert Miśkowiak	Poland	1			1
	Roman Povazhny	Russia	1			1
	Laszlo Szatmari	Hungary	1			1
	Rafał Szombierski	Poland	1			1

== See also ==
- Speedway World Championship Classification
- Speedway World Cup Classification
