= 2008 European Pairs Speedway Championship =

Motorcycle racing competition

Seasons
- ← 2007 2009 →

The 2008 European Pairs Speedway Championship was the fifth edition of the European Pairs Speedway Championship. The final was held in Natschbach-Loipersbach, Austria on 20 September.

Czech Republic were the defending European champions but Poland won their third title.

== Calendar ==
Day	Venue	Winner	
Semi-finals
19 July	(Ukraine) Rivne Speedway Stadium, Rivne	Russia	result
13 September	(Hungary) Miskolc	Czech Republic	result
Final
20 September	(Austria) Natschbach-Loipersbach	Poland	result

== Rules ==
- Semi-Final 1: 3 pairs will qualify to the Final
- Semi-Final 2: 3 pairs will qualify to the Final
- The pair of FMNR (Austria team) will be allocated to the Final

== Semifinal 1 ==
- (Ukraine) Rivne
- July 19

Draw 1. (Romania) → (Ukraine) B

Placing	Pair / Rider Name	Total	1	2	-	3	4	-	5	6	7	-	8	-	9	10	-	11	12	13	14	-	15
1	Russia	21							9							13							21
1	(3) Roman Ivanov	6	1				-				1							3			1
1	(4) Siemen Vlasov	3+1	-				2*				-							1			-
1	(16) Sergey Darkin	12	3				3				3										3
2	Latvia	19							7							12							19
2	(13) Vjačeslavs Giruckis	11				2			3							3			3		0
2	(14) Leonid Paura	8+3				Fx			2*							2*			2*		2
2	(21) None	0
3	Poland	17							5							8							17
3	(7) Karol Ząbik	11		3							2					0				3			3
3	(8) Zbigniew Czerwiński	6+2		2*							E					1				1			2*
3	(18) None	0
4	Ukraine	16							6							14							16
4	(1) Vladimir Kolodij, Sr.	5+1	N			1				2*			2							0
4	(2) Aleksandr Borodaj	11+1	2			3				3			1*							2
5	Slovenia	12							1							9							12
5	(11) Matej Žagar	0							-				-		-			-					-
5	(12) Izak Šantej	9							1				3		3			2					0
5	(20) Maks Gregorič	3+1							F				0		2*			Fx					1
6	Ukraine B	5							2							4							5
6	(5) Michail Oneszko	3		0			1			1					-				1
6	(6) Vladimir Omelian	1		-			Fx			-					1				0
6	(17) Vladimir Kolodij, Jr.	1		1						E					0
-	Slovakia	0							0							0							0
-	(9) None	0
-	(10) None	0
-	(19) None	0
Placing	Pair / Rider Name	Total	1	2	-	3	4	-	5	6	7	-	8	-	9	10	-	11	12	13	14	-	15

== Semifinal 2 ==
- (Hungary) Miskolc
- September 13

Draw 1. (France) → (Hungary) B

Placing	Pair / Rider Name	Total	1	2	3	4	5	6	7	8	9	10	11	12	13	14	15	16	17	18	19	20	21
1	Czech Republic	26							9							18							26
1	(1) Aleš Dryml, Jr.	0	-			-				-			-				-			-
1	(2) Filip Šitera	13+2	3			3				2*			3				0			2*
1	(15) Adrian Rymel	13+1	2*			1				3			1				3			3
2	Hungary	25							8							15							25
2	(11) Matej Ferjan	9+1			1*				-				2		-			3					3
2	(12) Norbert Magosi	12+2			2				3				0		3			2*					2*
2	(20) Laszlo Szatmari	4+2							2*						2*
3	Germany	25							7							17							25
3	(9) Richard Speiser	10+2			0			1				3		2*			2					2*
3	(10) Martin Smolinski	15+2			3			3				2*		3			1*					3
4	Hungary B	17							3							9							17
4	(13) Jozsef Tabaka	5+1				0			0			0				3			2*		X
4	(14) Sandor Tihanyi	12+1				2			1			1				2*			3		3
5	Finland	14							6							10							14
5	(3) Kai Laukkanen	6+2	1				2*				1*			E				0			2
5	(4) Aki-Pekka Mustonen	8	0				3				2			1				1			1
6	Italy	13							7							11							13
6	(7) Mattia Carpanese	4		3				0			-					-				1			0
6	(8) Guglielmo Franchetti	8+1		2*				2			3					X				0			1
6	(18) Alessandro Milanese	1									0					1
7	Croatia	6							2							4							6
7	(5) Ivan Vargek	3		0			1			0					1				0			1
7	(6) Renato Cvetko	3		1			0			1					0				1			0
Placing	Pair / Rider Name	Total	1	2	3	4	5	6	7	8	9	10	11	12	13	14	15	16	17	18	19	20	21

m - exclusion for exceeding two minute time allowance • t - exclusion for touching the tapes • x - other exclusion • e - retired or mechanical failure • f - fell
ns - non-starter • nc - non-classify

gate A - inside	gate B	gate C	gate D - outside

== Final ==
- Final
- 2008-09-20
- (Austria) Natschbach-Loipersbach
- Referee:
- Jury President:

Placing	Pair / Rider Name	Total	1	2	3	4	5	6	7	8	9	10	11	12	13	14	15	16	17	18	19	20	21	22
1	Poland	28							8							18							28
1	(11) Karol Ząbik	10+1			1*				-				-		3			3					3
1	(12) Adam Skórnicki	8			2				3				3		-			-					-
1	(20) Sebastian Ułamek	10+5							2*				2*		2*			2*					2*
2	Czech Republic	21 +3							4							11							21
2	(13) Aleš Dryml, Jr.	2+1				0			1			1*				-			-		-
2	(14) Lukáš Dryml	14				3			E			2				3			3		3			3
2	(21) Adrian Rymel	5+2														1			2*		2*
3	Russia	21 +2							8							14							21
3	(1) Aleksiej Charczenko	0	-			-				-			-				-			0
3	(2) Renat Gafurov	13+1	3			1*				3			E				3			3				2
3	(15) Roman Povazhny	8+2	2*			2				2*			1				1
4	Hungary	18							7							13							18
4	(9) Matej Ferjan	16			3			3				3		3			2					2
4	(10) Sandor Tihanyi	2+1			-			1				-		0			-					1*
4	(19) Norbert Magosi	0			0							0					0
5	Latvia	15							4							11							15
5	(7) Leonīds Paura	4+2		X				0			2*					0				1*			1
5	(8) Vjačeslavs Giruckis	11		2				2			3					2				2			0
6	Austria	13							7							9							13
6	(5) Manuel Hauzinger	12		3			3			1					1				1			3
6	(6) Manuel Novotny	1		1			0			-					0				0			-
6	(17) Andreas Boessner	0								0												0
7	Germany	10							4							8							10
7	(3) Martin Smolinski	8	1				2				1			2				1			1
7	(4) Kevin Wölbert	1	0				1*				0			-				-			-
7	(16) Tobias Busch	1												1*				0			0
Placing	Pair / Rider Name	Total	1	2	3	4	5	6	7	8	9	10	11	12	13	14	15	16	17	18	19	20	21	22

m - exclusion for exceeding two minute time allowance • t - exclusion for touching the tapes • x - other exclusion • e - retired or mechanical failure • f - fell
ns - non-starter • nc - non-classify

gate A - inside	gate B	gate C	gate D - outside

== See also ==
- 2008 Individual Speedway European Championship
