= Oleg Kurguskin =

Russian motorcycle speedway rider (born 1966)

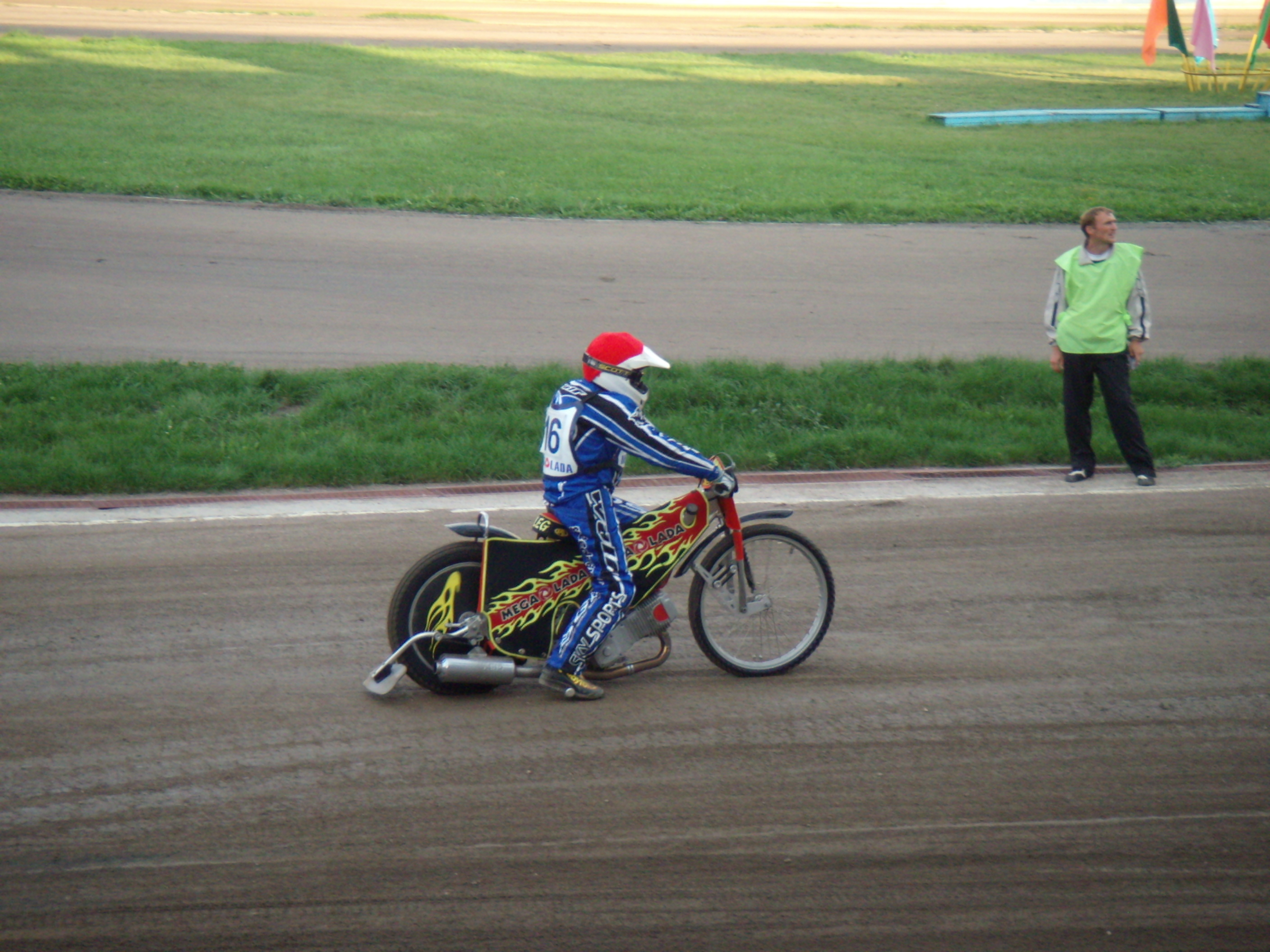
- Born: 11 April 1966 (age 60); Elista, Soviet Union
- Nationality: Russian

Career history

Soviet Union/Russia
- 1983–1991: Tajfun Elista
- 1992–1993: Cherkessk
- 1994–2009: Togliatti

Poland
- 1999–2000: Ostrów
- 2001: Łódź

Individual honours
- 1994, 1999, 2003, 2004: Russian champion
- 1989, 1991: Soviet championship silver

Team honours
- 1996: World Cup silver
- 2003: European Club Champions' Cup winner

Oleg Anatolyevich Kurguskin (Russian: Олег Анатольевич Кургускин; born 11 April 1966, in Elista) is a Russian motorcycle speedway rider who was a member of Russia team at 2001 and 2005 Speedway World Cup.

== Career ==
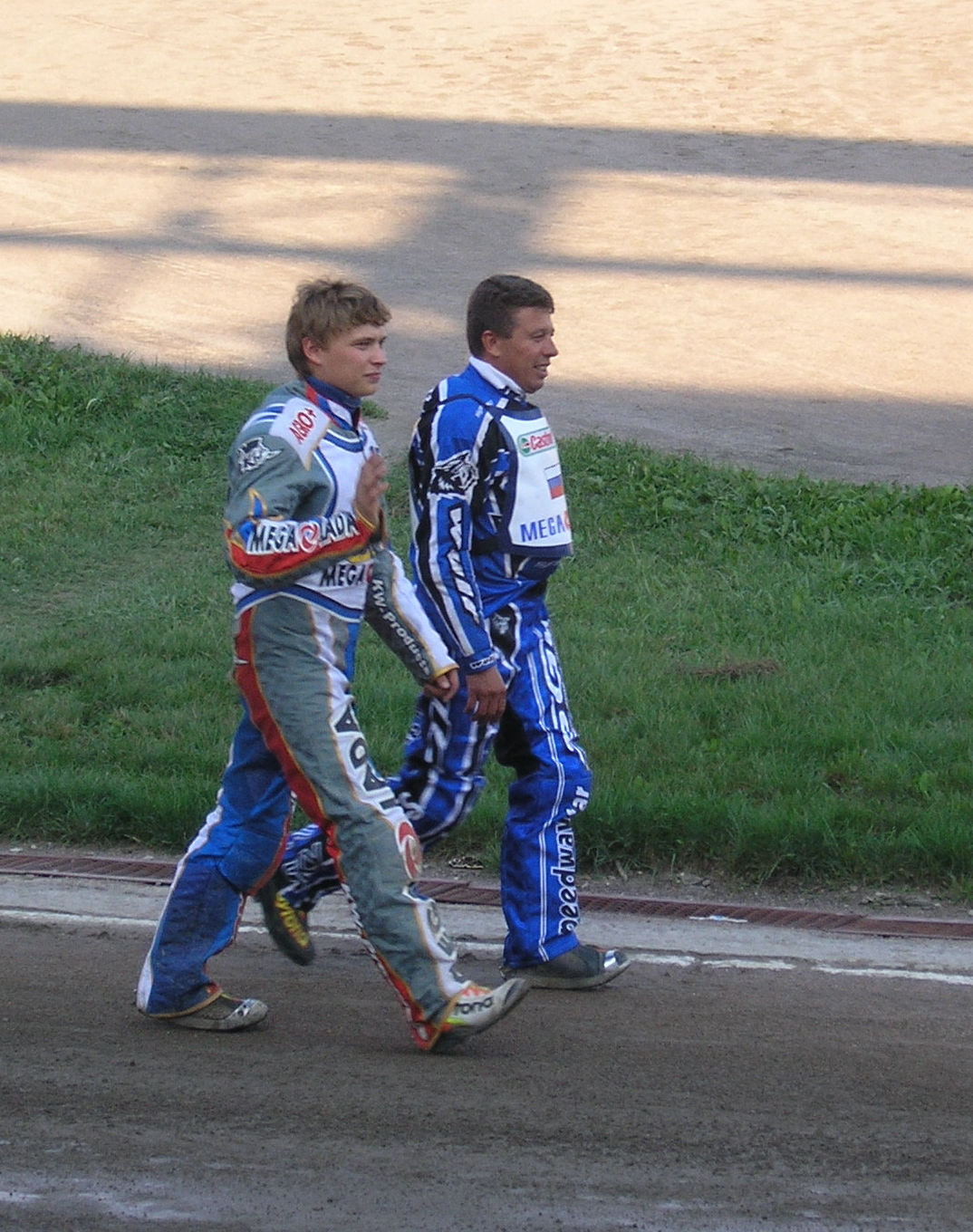
Kurguskin (right) and Emil Saifutdinov (2007)

Kurguskin won the silver medal at the Soviet Union championship in 1989 and 1991. He was also the four-times Russian champion in 1994, 1999, 2003 and 2004.

Kurguskin was a stand out rider when he was part of the first ever Russian team (still under the Soviet Union flag) to tour Australia in 1990/91. While the team (which included Kurguskin, Rene Aas, Mikhail Starostin, Rinat Mardanshin, Rif Saitgareev, Vladimir Trofimov, Viktor Gajdym, Andrejs Koroļevs, and Grigori Kharchenko) did not compete in a test against the Australians, they did win most of their matches around the country and won new fans with their professionalism and the way they adapted to the Australian culture.

In 1996, Mardanshin won a silver medal at the Speedway World Team Cup held on 15 September at the Rhein-Main Arena in Diedenbergen.

With Russian club Mega-Lada Togliatti, Kurguskin won European Club Champions' Cup in 2003.

In 2012, Kurguskin was the team manager of the Russian squad for the 2012 Speedway World Cup.

== Honours ==
=== World Championships ===
- Team World Championship (Speedway World Team Cup and Speedway World Cup)
  - 2001 - (Poland) - 8th place (3 pts in Race-off)
  - 2005 - 7th place (2 pts in Event 1)
- Individual U-21 European (=World) Championship
  - 1987 - (Poland) Zielona Góra - 14th place (4 pts)

=== European Championships ===
- European Club Champions' Cup
  - 1999 - (Poland) Bydgoszcz - 3rd place (9 pts)
  - 2003 - (Czech Republic) Pardubice - European Champion (14 pts)
  - 2004 - (Slovenia) Ljubljana - Runner-up (5 pts)

== See also ==
- Russia national speedway team
