= 2005 Speedway World Cup =

46th edition of the annual motorcycle speedway World Cup competition

Speedway World Cup
- Venue: Stadion Olimpijski
- Location: Poland
- Start date: 31 July
- End date: 6 August
- Nations: 8

Champions
- Poland

The 2005 Speedway World Cup (SWC) was the 5th FIM Speedway World Cup season. The Final took place on August 6, 2005 in the Olympic Stadium in Wrocław, Poland.

Host team Poland (62 pts) beat defending champion Sweden (34 pts), Denmark (31 pts) and Great Britain (27 pts) in the Final.

== Qualification ==
- Qualifier 1
- (Latvia) Stadium Lokomotīve, Daugavpils

Pos.	National team	Pts.
1	Russia	61
2	United States	52
3	Latvia	31
4	France	6

- Qualifier 2
- (Italy) Pista Olimpia Terenzano, Terenzano

Pos.	National team	Pts.
1	Germany	30
2	Slovenia	23
3	Hungary	21
4	Italy	16

=== Qualifier 1 ===
- 5 June 2005
- (Latvia) Latvijas Spidveja Centrs, Daugavpils

Placing	Team / Rider name	Total	1	2	3	4	5	6	7	8	9	10	11	12	13	14	15	16	17	18	19	20	21	22	23	24	25
1	Russia	61	3	5	7	10	13	14	14	17	20	22	25	28	30	32	35	37	40	43	46	48	51	53	55	58	61
1	(1) Sergey Darkin	12	3					1					3					2					3
1	(2) Denis Gizatullin (c)	10		2					E					3					3					2
1	(3) Simon Vlasov	12			2					3					2					3					2
1	(4) Renat Gafurov	14				3					3					2					3					3
1	(5) Oleg Kurguskin	13					3					2					3					2					3
2	United States	52	2	5	6	7	9	12	15	16	18	21	23	24	27	30	32	35	37	38	40	43	44	47	50	52	52
2	(1) Sam Ermolenko	13	2								2				3							3		3
2	(2) Greg Hancock (c)	15		3								3				3		3							3
2	(3) Billy Janniro	10			1			3									2		2							2
2	(4) Josh Larsen	7				1			3				2							1							X
2	(5) Brent Werner	7					2			1				1							2		1
Placing	Team / Rider name	Total	1	2	3	4	5	6	7	8	9	10	11	12	13	14	15	16	17	18	19	20	21	22	23	24	25
3	Latvia	31	1	2	5	7	8	8	9	11	12	13	14	16	17	18	19	19	20	22	23	24	26	27	28	29	31
3	(1) Leonid Paura	7	1							2						1			1								2
3	(2) Kasts Poudzuks	7		1							1						1			2			2
3	(3) Andriej Korolew	7			3							1	1								1			1
3	(4) Nikolaj Kokin (c)	6				2		X						2								1			1
3	(5) Aleksandr Ivanov	4					1		1						1			X								1
4	France	6	0	0	0	0	0	2	4	4	4	4	4	4	4	4	4	5	5	5	5	5	5	5	5	5	6
4	(1) Mathieu Tresarrieu	2	0						2			F					X				0				0
4	(2) Stéphane Trésarrieu (c)	0		0						0			0									0				0
4	(3) Sebastien Tresarrieu	2			0						0			E				1									1
4	(4) Jérome Lespinasse	0				X						-			0				0				0
4	(5) Christophe Dubernand	2					E	2								0				0				0
Placing	Team / Rider name	Total	1	2	3	4	5	6	7	8	9	10	11	12	13	14	15	16	17	18	19	20	21	22	23	24	25

M - exclusion for exceeding two minute time allowance • T - exclusion for touching the tapes • X - other exclusion • E - retired or mechanical failure • F - fell

Helmet colours were permanent for each team (red, blue, white and yellow/black). Colours in tables show gate positions:
gate A – inside	gate B	gate C	gate D – outside

=== Qualifier 2 ===
- 4 June 2005
- (Italy) Pista Olimpia Terenzano, Terenzano

Placing	Team / Rider name	Total	1	2	3	4	5	6	7	8	9	10	11	12	13	14	15	16	17	18	19	20	21	22	23	24	25
1	Germany	30	0	1	4	7	9	12	15	17	20	20	21	24	27	29	30	30	30	30	30	30	30	30	30	30	30
1	(1) Christian Hefenbrock	4	0					3					1
1	(2) René Schäfer	7		1					3					3
1	(3) Martin Smolinski (c)	8			3					2					3
1	(4) Thomas Stange	8				3					3					2
1	(5) Michael Hertrich	3					2					E					1
2	Slovenia	23	2	5	7	7	8	9	11	14	14	15	17	18	18	21	23	23	23	23	23	23	23	23	23	23	23
2	(1) Jernej Kolenko	6	2						2								2
2	(2) Matej Žagar (c)	11		3						3			2			3
2	(3) Izak Šantej	3			2						0			1
2	(4) Ales Kraljic	1				E						1			0
2	(5) Denis Štojs	2					1	1								-
Placing	Team / Rider name	Total	1	2	3	4	5	6	7	8	9	10	11	12	13	14	15	16	17	18	19	20	21	22	23	24	25
3	Hungary	21	1	3	4	6	9	11	12	12	14	16	19	19	20	21	21	21	21	21	21	21	21	21	21	21	21
3	(1) Norbert Magosi (c)	2	1							0						1
3	(2) Laszlo Szatmari	4		2							2						E
3	(3) Sándor Tihanyi	6			1							2	3
3	(4) Zsolt Bencze	4				2		2						0
3	(5) Attila Stefani	5					3		1						1
4	Italy	16	3	3	3	4	4	4	4	5	6	9	9	11	13	13	16	16	16	16	16	16	16	16	16	16	16
4	(1) Emiliano Sanchez	6	3								1				2
4	(2) Simone Terenzani	3		E								3				E
4	(3) Christian Miotello	3			0			0									3
4	(4) Mattia Carpanese (c)	1				1			0				0
4	(5) Daniele Tessari	3					E			1				2
Placing	Team / Rider name	Total	1	2	3	4	5	6	7	8	9	10	11	12	13	14	15	16	17	18	19	20	21	22	23	24	25

M - exclusion for exceeding two minute time allowance • T - exclusion for touching the tapes • X - other exclusion • E - retired or mechanical failure • F - fell

Helmet colours were permanent for each team (red, blue, white and yellow/black). Colours in tables show gate positions:
gate A – inside	gate B	gate C	gate D – outside

== Main tournament ==
Semifinals
31 July - Swindon (Event 1)
Great Britain	59
Denmark	54
Czech Republic	26
Russia	17
2 August - Eskilstuna (Event 2)
Sweden	51
Australia	50
Poland	49
Germany	5

Race-off
4 August - Wrocław (Race-off)
Poland	63
Denmark	48
Australia	30
Czech Republic	16

Final
6 August - Wrocław (Final)
Poland	62
Sweden	34
Denmark	31
Great Britain	27

=== Event 1 ===
- 31 July 2005
- (England) Abbey Stadium, Swindon

Placing	Team / Rider name	Total	1	2	3	4	5	6	7	8	9	10	11	12	13	14	15	16	17	18	19	20	21	22	23	24	25
1	Great Britain	59	0	3	6	9	11	14	16	19	22	24	26	28	31	34	37	39	42	45	47	48	51	52	54	57	59
1	(1) Joe Screen	8	0								3				3							1		1
1	(2) Simon Stead	12		3								2				3		2							2
1	(3) Lee Richardson	15			3			3									3		3							3
1	(4) Scott Nicholls (c)	12				3			2				2							3							2
1	(5) Chris Harris	12					2			3				2							2		3
2	Denmark	54	3	5	5	7	10	10	13	15	16	19	22	25	27	29	31	37	39	39	42	45	46	48	49	51	54
2	(1) Nicki Pedersen	12	3						3								2				3				1
2	(2) Bjarne Pedersen	12		2						2			3									3				2
2	(3) Hans N. Andersen (c)	13			F						1			3				6J									3
2	(4) Niels Kristian Iversen	10				2						3			2				2				1
2	(5) Charlie Gjedde	7					3	0								2				0				2
Placing	Team / Rider name	Total	1	2	3	4	5	6	7	8	9	10	11	12	13	14	15	16	17	18	19	20	21	22	23	24	25
3	Czech Republic	26	1	1	2	3	3	5	6	7	9	10	10	11	12	12	12	13	13	15	15	15	17	23	26	26	26
3	(1) Adrian Rymel (c)	2	1							1						0			F								0
3	(2) Aleš Dryml, Jr.	12		0							2						0			2			2	6J
3	(3) Lukáš Dryml	2			1							1	0								X			-		E
3	(4) Tomáš Topinka	7				1		2						1								0			3
3	(5) Tomáš Suchánek	3					0		1						1			1								-
4	Russia	17	2	3	5	5	6	6	6	6	6	6	7	7	7	8	9	9	10	11	12	14	14	14	14	16	17
4	(1) Sergey Darkin	5	2					X					1					0					0			2J
4	(2) Oleg Kurguskin	2		1					0					0					1					-	0
4	(3) Simon Vlasov	2			2					0					X					-					-
4	(4) Denis Gizatullin (c)	2				0					0					1					1			0		-
4	(5) Renat Gafurov	6					1					F					1			1		2					1
Placing	Team / Rider name	Total	1	2	3	4	5	6	7	8	9	10	11	12	13	14	15	16	17	18	19	20	21	22	23	24	25

M - exclusion for exceeding two minute time allowance • T - exclusion for touching the tapes • X - other exclusion • E - retired or mechanical failure • F - fell

Helmet colours were permanent for each team (red, blue, white and yellow/black). Colours in tables show gate positions:
gate A – inside	gate B	gate C	gate D – outside

=== Event 2 ===
- 2 August 2005
- (Sweden) Smedstadion, Eskilstuna

Placing	Team / Rider name	Total	1	2	3	4	5	6	7	8	9	10	11	12	13	14	15	16	17	18	19	20	21	22	23	24	25
1	Sweden	51	1	3	5	7	9	12	15	17	19	22	23	25	27	28	30	33	36	38	39	41	43	45	48	51	51
1	(1) Antonio Lindbäck	9	1								2				2							2		2
1	(2) Andreas Jonsson	12		2								3				1		3							3
1	(3) Tony Rickardsson	13			2			3									2		3							3
1	(4) Peter Karlsson (c)	8				2			3				1							2							0
1	(5) Fredrik Lindgren	9					2			2				2							1		2
2	Australia	50	3	4	5	6	7	9	10	13	13	15	21	24	24	27	28	30	31	34	36	37	40	43	45	47	50
2	(1) Leigh Adams (c)	13	3							3						3			1								3
2	(2) Ryan Sullivan	8		1							0						1			3			3
2	(3) Jason Crump	14			1							2	6J								2			3
2	(4) Adam Shields	9				1		2						3								1			2
2	(5) Davey Watt	6					1		1						0			2								2
Placing	Team / Rider name	Total	1	2	3	4	5	6	7	8	9	10	11	12	13	14	15	16	17	18	19	20	21	22	23	24	25
3	Poland	49	2	5	8	11	14	15	17	18	21	22	24	25	28	30	33	34	36	36	39	42	43	43	44	45	49
3	(1) Krzysztof Kasprzak	7	2					1					2					1					1
3	(2) Piotr Protasiewicz	8		3					2					1					2					E2
3	(3) Rune Holta	8			3					1					3					Fx					1
3	(4) Jarosław Hampel	12				3					3					2					3					1
3	(5) Tomasz Gollob (c)	14					3					1					3					3					4J
4	Germany	5	0	0	0	0	0	0	0	0	1	1	1	1	2	2	2	2	2	3	3	3	3	4	4	4	5
4	(1) Christian Hefenbrock	0	E/st						0								0				0				0
4	(2) René Schäfer	0		0						0			0									0				0
4	(3) Martin Smolinski (c)	2			0						1			0				0									1
4	(4) Thomas Stange	1				0						0			1				0				0
4	(5) Mathias Schultz	2					0	0								0				1				1
Placing	Team / Rider name	Total	1	2	3	4	5	6	7	8	9	10	11	12	13	14	15	16	17	18	19	20	21	22	23	24	25

M - exclusion for exceeding two minute time allowance • T - exclusion for touching the tapes • X - other exclusion • E - retired or mechanical failure • F - fell

Helmet colours were permanent for each team (red, blue, white and yellow/black). Colours in tables show gate positions:
gate A – inside	gate B	gate C	gate D – outside

=== Race-off ===
- 4 August 2005
- (Poland) Olympic Stadium, Wrocław

Placing	Team / Rider name	Total	1	2	3	4	5	6	7	8	9	10	11	12	13	14	15	16	17	18	19	20	21	22	23	24	25
1	Poland	63	3	6	9	10	13	16	18	20	23	26	28	31	33	36	39	41	44	47	48	50	53	56	57	60	63
1	(1) Jarosław Hampel	10	3						2								3				1				1
1	(2) Rune Holta	12		3						2			2									2				3
1	(3) Tomasz Gollob (c)	14			3						3			3				2									3
1	(4) Piotr Protasiewicz	12				1						3			2				3				3
1	(5) Grzegorz Walasek	15					3	3								3				3				3
2	Denmark	48	2	4	5	8	9	10	13	16	18	19	20	20	21	22	23	26	28	29	32	38	39	41	44	46	48
2	(1) Kenneth Bjerre	5	2					1					1					-					1
2	(2) Niels Kristian Iversen	9		2					3					0					2					2
2	(3) Hans N. Andersen (c)	15			1					3					1					1		6J			3
2	(4) Nicki Pedersen	14				3					2					1		3			3					2
2	(5) Bjarne Pedersen	5					1					1					1					-					2
Placing	Team / Rider name	Total	1	2	3	4	5	6	7	8	9	10	11	12	13	14	15	16	17	18	19	20	21	22	23	24	25
3	Australia	30	0	1	3	5	5	7	8	9	10	12	15	16	22	24	24	24	25	27	29	29	29	29	29	29	30
3	(1) Davey Watt	1	0								1				-							-		0
3	(2) Adam Shields	5		1								2				2		0							0
3	(3) Ryan Sullivan	5			2			2									0		1			0				0
3	(4) Leigh Adams (c)	15				2			1				3		6J					2							1
3	(5) Steve Johnston	4					X			1				1							2		0
4	Czech Republic	16	1	1	1	1	3	3	3	3	3	3	3	5	5	5	7	8	8	8	8	9	11	13	15	16	16
4	(1) Tomáš Suchánek	1	1							0						0			0								Fx
4	(2) Aleš Dryml, Jr.	4		E4							0						2			0			2
4	(3) Tomáš Topinka	0			0							0	0								0			-
4	(4) Lukáš Dryml	7				0		E4						2								1		2J	2
4	(5) Adrian Rymel (c)	4					2		0						0			1								1
Placing	Team / Rider name	Total	1	2	3	4	5	6	7	8	9	10	11	12	13	14	15	16	17	18	19	20	21	22	23	24	25

M - exclusion for exceeding two minute time allowance • T - exclusion for touching the tapes • X - other exclusion • E - retired or mechanical failure • F - fell

Helmet colours were permanent for each team (red, blue, white and yellow/black). Colours in tables show gate positions:
gate A – inside	gate B	gate C	gate D – outside

=== Final ===
- 6 August 2005
- (Poland) Olympic Stadium, Wrocław

Placing	Team / Rider name	Total	1	2	3	4	5	6	7	8	9	10	11	12	13	14	15	16	17	18	19	20	21	22	23	24	25
1	Poland	62	0	3	5	8	11	12	13	15	17	20	23	26	29	32	34	37	39	42	45	48	51	54	57	59	62
1	(1) Grzegorz Walasek	10	0					1					3					3					3
1	(2) Rune Holta	12		3					1					3					2					3
1	(3) Piotr Protasiewicz	13			2					2					3					3					3
1	(4) Jarosław Hampel	13				3					2					3					3					2
1	(5) Tomasz Gollob (c)	14					3					3					2					3					3
2	Sweden	34	3	5	6	8	9	11	13	13	16	16	17	19	21	21	21	25	26	26	28	29	31	32	32	32	34
2	(1) Tony Rickardsson	7	3						2								0			0	2				0
2	(2) Peter Karlsson (c)	4		2						E4			1									1				0
2	(3) Andreas Jonsson	12			1						3			2				4J									2
2	(4) Antonio Lindbäck	7				2						0			2				1				2
2	(5) Fredrik Lindgren	4					1	2								0				-				1
Placing	Team / Rider name	Total	1	2	3	4	5	6	7	8	9	10	11	12	13	14	15	16	17	18	19	20	21	22	23	24	25
3	Denmark	31	2	2	5	5	7	7	7	10	11	13	15	16	17	21	22	23	23	25	25	27	28	28	30	31	31
3	(1) Hans N. Andersen (c)	9	2							3						4			0								0
3	(2) Bjarne Pedersen	5		0							1						1			2			1
3	(3) Kenneth Bjerre	7			3							2	2								0			0
3	(4) Nicki Pedersen	6				0		E4						1								2			2	1
3	(5) Niels Kristian Iversen	4					2		0						1			1								-
4	Great Britain	25	1	2	2	3	3	6	9	10	10	11	11	11	11	12	15	15	18	19	20	20	20	20	21	24	25
4	(1) Joe Screen	1	1								0				-							0		-
4	(2) Simon Stead	4		1								1				1		E3						2	1
4	(3) Lee Richardson	12			0			3									3		3				0			3
4	(4) Scott Nicholls (c)	6				1			3				0		E4J					1							1
4	(5) Chris Harris	2					0			1				0							1		-
Placing	Team / Rider name	Total	1	2	3	4	5	6	7	8	9	10	11	12	13	14	15	16	17	18	19	20	21	22	23	24	25

M - exclusion for exceeding two minute time allowance • T - exclusion for touching the tapes • X - other exclusion • E - retired or mechanical failure • F - fell

Helmet colours were permanent for each team (red, blue, white and yellow/black). Colours in tables show gate positions:
gate A – inside	gate B	gate C	gate D – outside

== Final classification ==
Pos.	National team	Pts.
Gold	Poland	62
Silver	Sweden	34
Bronze	Denmark	31
4	Great Britain	27
5	Australia	30
6	Czech Republic	16
7	Russia	17
8	Germany	5
