= 2006 European Pairs Speedway Championship =

Motorcycle racing competition

Seasons
- ← 2005 2007 →

The 2006 European Pairs Speedway Championship was the third edition of the European Pairs Speedway Championship. The final was held in Lendava, Slovenia on 5 August. Poland won their second title.

== Semifinal 1 ==
- (Ukraine) Rivne Speedway Stadium, Rivne
- May 27

Draw 1. (Denmark) → (Romania)
Draw 2. (Latvia) → (Ukraine) B
Draw 3. (Netherlands) → (Ukraine) C

Placing	Pair / Rider Name	Total	1	2	3	4	5	6	7	8	9	10	11	12	13	14	15	16	17	18	19	20	21
1	Czech Republic	29							10							19							29
1	(13) Aleš Dryml, Jr.	8				2			2			2				-			2		-
1	(14) Bohumil Brhel	9				3			-			-				1			3		2
1	(21) Lukáš Dryml	12							3			3				3					3
2	Ukraine B	23							9							15							23
2	(9) Igor Marko	14			2			3				1		3			2					3
2	(10) Vladimir Kolodiy	9			3			1				0		2			3					0
2	(19) -	0
3	Russia	21							9							17							21
3	(5) Roman Ivanov	15		3			3			3					3				1			2
3	(6) Daniil Ivanov	0		-			-			-					-				-			-
3	(17) Jevgeny Gomozov	6		1			2			E					2				0			1
4	Ukraine	18							4							11							18
4	(7) Andrey Karpov	14		2				2			3					2				2			3
4	(8) Aleksandr Boroday	4		0				0			2					0				1			1
4	(18) -	0
5	Austria	16							6							12							16
5	(1) Fritz Wallner	12	3			X				2			3				1			3
5	(2) Manuel Novotny	4	2			1				1			E				0			0
5	(15) -	0
6	Ukraine C	13							2							6							13
6	(11) Vladimir Omelyan	8			0				1				1		1			3					2
6	(12) Aleksandr Pyatnichko	5			1				0				2		0			2					0
6	(20) -	0
7	Romania	6							2							4							6
7	(3) Aleksandru Toma	0	0				0				E			0				X			-
7	(4) Fanica Popa	0	-				-				-			-				-			0
7	(16) Mircea Agrisan	6	1				1				1			1				1			1
Placing	Pair / Rider Name	Total	1	2	3	4	5	6	7	8	9	10	11	12	13	14	15	16	17	18	19	20	21

m - exclusion for exceeding two minute time allowance • t - exclusion for touching the tapes • x - other exclusion • e - retired or mechanical failure • f - fell
ns - non-starter • nc - non-classify

gate A - inside	gate B	gate C	gate D - outside

== Semifinal 2 ==
- (Italy) Lonigo
- June 2

1	E	FIN Finland	26+3

No	Rider Name	Pts.	Heats
9	Joonas Kylmäkorpi	10	
10	Kai Laukkanen	16 +3	
19	Kauko Nieminen		

2	C	POL Poland	26+2

No	Rider Name	Pts.	Heats
5	Grzegorz Walasek	12 +2	
6	Wiesław Jaguś	8	
17	Damian Baliński	6	

3	A	GER Germany	20

No	Rider Name	Pts.	Heats
1	Martin Smolinski	16	
2	Christian Hefenbrock	0	
15	Thomas Stange	4	

4	F	HUN Hungary	18

No	Rider Name	Pts.	Heats
11	Laszlo Szatmari	11	
12	Norbert Magosi	7	
20	None		

5	D	FRA France	15

No	Rider Name	Pts.	Heats
7	Matthiu Tresariieu	8	
8	Stephane Tresariieu	7	
18	Christophe Dubernard	-	

6	B	ITA Italy	15

No	Rider Name	Pts.	Heats
3	Matia Carpanesse	11	
4	Daniele Tessari	4	
16	Simone Terenzani	0	

7	G	HRV Croatia	6

No	Rider Name	Pts.	Heats
13	Marko Vlah	3	
14	Ivan Vargek	3	
21	None		

== Final ==
- (Slovenia) Lendava
- August 5

Draw 1. (Finland) → (Hungary)

Placing	Pair / Rider Name	Total	1	2	3	4	5	6	7	8	9	10	11	12	13	14	15	16	17	18	19	20	21
1	Poland	27							9							19							27
1	(5) Sebastian Ułamek	14		2			3			2					2				2			3
1	(6) Wiesław Jaguś	13		3			1			3					3				3			0
1	(17) Marcin Rempała	0
2	Slovenia	25							10							17							25
2	(9) Matej Žagar	11			2			3				X		1			3					2
2	(10) Jernej Kolenko	14			3			2				3		3			2					1
2	(19) Izak Šantej	0
3	Hungary	17							6							11							17
3	(13) Norbert Magosi	12				3			3			2				1			1		2
3	(14) Laszlo Szatmari	5				0			0			E				2			0		3
3	(21) -	0
4	Czech Republic	15							2							7							15
4	(7) Bohumil Brhel	0		X				E			F					-				-			-
4	(8) Adrian Rymel	13		1				1			2					3				3			3
4	(18) Zdeněk Simota	2														0				1			1
5	Russia	12							4							9							12
5	(11) Roman Ivanov	10			1				2				3		1			1					2
5	(12) Ilya Bondarenko	2			0				1				1		0			-					-
5	(20) Daniil Ivanov -	0																2					F
6	Ukraine	13							5							10							13
6	(3) Andrey Karpov	13	3				2				3			2				3			F
6	(4) Sergey Senko	0	E				E				X			-				E			-
6	(16) -	0
7	Germany	12							6							9							12
7	(1) Thomas Stange	9	2			2				0			2				1			2
7	(2) Kevin Wölbert	3	1			1				1			0				-			-
7	(15) Max Dilger	0															0			0
Placing	Pair / Rider Name	Total	1	2	3	4	5	6	7	8	9	10	11	12	13	14	15	16	17	18	19	20	21

m - exclusion for exceeding two minute time allowance • t - exclusion for touching the tapes • x - other exclusion • e - retired or mechanical failure • f - fell
ns - non-starter • nc - non-classify

gate A - inside	gate B	gate C	gate D - outside

== See also ==
- 2006 Individual Speedway European Championship
