= 2007 European Pairs Speedway Championship =

Motorcycle racing competition

Seasons
- ← 2006 2008 →

The 2007 European Pairs Speedway Championship was the fourth edition of the European Pairs Speedway Championship. The final was held in Terenzano, Italy on 1 September. The Czech Republic won their second title.

== Semifinal 1 ==
- (Austria) Natschbach-Loipersbach
- May 5

Placing	Pair / Rider Name	Total	1	2	3	4	5	6	7	8	9	10	11	12	13	14	15	16	17	18	19	20	21	22
1	Austria	24 +3							8							17							24
1	(1) Manuel Hauzinger	18	3			3				3			3				3			3				3
1	(2) Fritz Wallner	5	0			2				2			1				-			-
1	(15) Manuel Novotny	1															1			0
2	Czech Republic	24 +2							9							17							24
2	(9) Aleš Dryml, Jr.	10			2			3				-		-			2					3
2	(10) Lukáš Dryml	10			3			1				3		3			-					-		2
2	(19) Zdeněk Simota	4										2		0			0					2
3	Finland	20							7							14							20
3	(7) Kai Laukkanen	11		2				2			3					2				1			1
3	(8) Juha Hautamäki	9		3				0			2					E				2			2
3	(18) -	0
4	Slovenia	18							4							9							18
4	(13) Izak Šantej	9				X			3			0				3			2		1
4	(14) Jernej Kolenko	9				1			X			1				1			3		3
4	(21) Denis Štojs	0
5	Sweden	19							8							12							19
5	(3) Viktor Bergström	8	2				3				0			1				1			1
5	(4) Ricky Kling	11	1				2				1			2				3			2
5	(16) -	0
6	Germany	16							4							11							16
6	(11) René Schäfer	6			0				2				0		2			2					0
6	(12) Max Dilger	10			1				1				2		3			E					3
6	(20) -	0
7	France	6							2							4							6
7	(5) Stéphane Tresarrieu	1		0			X			0					0				0			1
7	(6) Jérome Lespinasse	5		1			1			1					1				1			F
7	(17) Sebastien Brousillou	0
Placing	Pair / Rider Name	Total	1	2	3	4	5	6	7	8	9	10	11	12	13	14	15	16	17	18	19	20	21	22

m - exclusion for exceeding two minute time allowance • t - exclusion for touching the tapes • x - other exclusion • e - retired or mechanical failure • f - fell
ns - non-starter • nc - non-classify

gate A - inside	gate B	gate C	gate D - outside

== Semifinal 2 ==
- (Hungary) Debrecen
- July 14

Placing	Pair / Rider Name	Total	1	2	3	4	5	6	7	8	9	10	11	12	13	14	15	16	17	18	19	20	21	22
1	Poland	25							10							20							25
1	(13) Robert Kościecha	3				3			-			-				-			-		-
1	(14) Adrian Miedziński	11				2			2			2				3			2		T
1	(21) Sławomir Drabik	11							3			3				2			3		E
2	Ukraine	21							6							11							21
2	(3) Andrey Karpov	15	3				2				1			3				3			3
2	(4) Vladimir Trofimov	3	-				0				0			1				2			-
2	(16) Yaroslav Polyuhovich	3	1								0										2
3	Russia	20 +3							9							12							20
3	(9) Ruslan Gatiyatov	13			2			3				1		2			2					3		3
3	(10) Marat Gatiyatov	0			-			-				-		0			-					-
3	(19) Aleksey Kharchenko	7			3			1				0					1					2
4	Hungary	20 +w							6							12							20
4	(7) Sandor Tihanyi	1		1				F			-					-				-			-
4	(8) Jozsef Tabaka	11		3				-			3					0				2			3	w
4	(18) Norbert Magosi	8						2			2					1				1			2
5	Croatia	17							3							11							17
5	(1) Jurica Pavlič	15	2			1				3			3				3			3
5	(2) Ivan Vargek	2	0			0				-			2				0			0
5	(15) -	0
6	Norway	16							6							14							16
6	(5) Bjoern G. Hansen	9		2			1			2					3				0			1
6	(6) Marius Rokeberg	7		0			3			1					2				1			-
6	(17) Kenneth Borgenhaug	0
7	Romania	6							2							4							6
7	(11) Alexandr Toma	3			N				1				1		X			N					1
7	(12) Fanica Popa	3			1				0				F		1			1					E
7	(20) -	0
Placing	Pair / Rider Name	Total	1	2	3	4	5	6	7	8	9	10	11	12	13	14	15	16	17	18	19	20	21	22

m - exclusion for exceeding two minute time allowance • t - exclusion for touching the tapes • x - other exclusion • e - retired or mechanical failure • f - fell
ns - non-starter • nc - non-classify

gate A - inside	gate B	gate C	gate D - outside

== Final ==
- (Italy) Terenzano
- September 1

Placing	Pair / Rider Name	Total	1	2	3	4	5	6	7	8	9	10	11	12	13	14	15	16	17	18	19	20	21	22
1	Czech Republic	26							8							17							26
1	(9) Aleš Dryml, Jr.	12			2			3				3		2			2					-
1	(10) Lukáš Dryml	13			3			0				1		3			3					3
1	(19) Zdeněk Simota	1																				1
2	Poland	22							6							12							22
2	(7) Sławomir Drabik	7		1				-			0					1				3			2
2	(8) Adam Skórnicki	1		-				1			-					-				-			-
2	(18) Krzysztof Jabłoński	14		2				2			3					2				2			3
3	Russia	21							7							11							21
3	(3) Denis Gizatullin	9	1				3				1			0				2			2
3	(4) Renat Gafurov	12	2				1				2			1				3			3
3	(16) -	0
4	Finland	18							5							12							18
4	(5) Kai Laukkanen	16		3			2			3					3				3			2
4	(6) Juha Hautamäki	1		0			0			-					0				1			-
4	(17) Tero Aarnio	1								1												0
5	Ukraine	13							4							11							13
5	(11) Andrey Karpov	11			1				3				3		2			1					1
5	(12) Yaroslav Polyukhovich	2			0				0				1		1			0					0
5	(20) -	0
6	Austria	13							7							11							13
6	(1) Manuel Hauzinger	12	3			3				2			2				1			1
6	(2) Manuel Novotny	0	0			-				-			-				0			0
6	(15) Fritz Wallner	1				1				0			0
7	Italy	13							5							10							13
7	(13) Mattia Carpanese	0				0			-			0				-			-		0
7	(14) Andrea Maida	10				2			2			2				3			0		1
7	(21) Guglielmo Franchetti	3							1										2
Placing	Pair / Rider Name	Total	1	2	3	4	5	6	7	8	9	10	11	12	13	14	15	16	17	18	19	20	21	22

m - exclusion for exceeding two minute time allowance • t - exclusion for touching the tapes • x - other exclusion • e - retired or mechanical failure • f - fell
ns - non-starter • nc - non-classify

gate A - inside	gate B	gate C	gate D - outside

== See also ==
- 2007 Individual Speedway European Championship
