= 2001 Speedway World Cup =

42nd edition of the annual motorcycle speedway World Cup competition

Speedway World Cup
- Venue: Poland
- Start date: 1 July
- End date: 7 July
- Nations: 12

Champions
- Australia

The 2001 Speedway World Cup (SWC) was the 1st FIM Speedway World Cup season (and 42nd edition of a speedway team World Cup). The Final took place on 7 July 2001 in Wrocław, Poland. The tournament was won by Australia (68 points) and they beat host team Poland (65 pts), Sweden (51 pts), Denmark (44 pts) and United States (30 pts) in the Final.

== Qualification ==
- Preliminary round 1
- (Slovenia) Ilirija Sports Park, Ljubljana

Pos.	National team	Pts.
1	Slovenia	48
2	Russia	45
3	Italy	25
4	Ukraine	1

- Preliminary round 2
- (Hungary) Gázvezeték Street Sports Complex, Debrecen

Pos.	National team	Pts.
1	Finland	48
2	Hungary	47
3	Norway	12
4	Latvia	10

The two group winners and runners-up qualified to 2001 Speedway World Cup.

== Venues ==
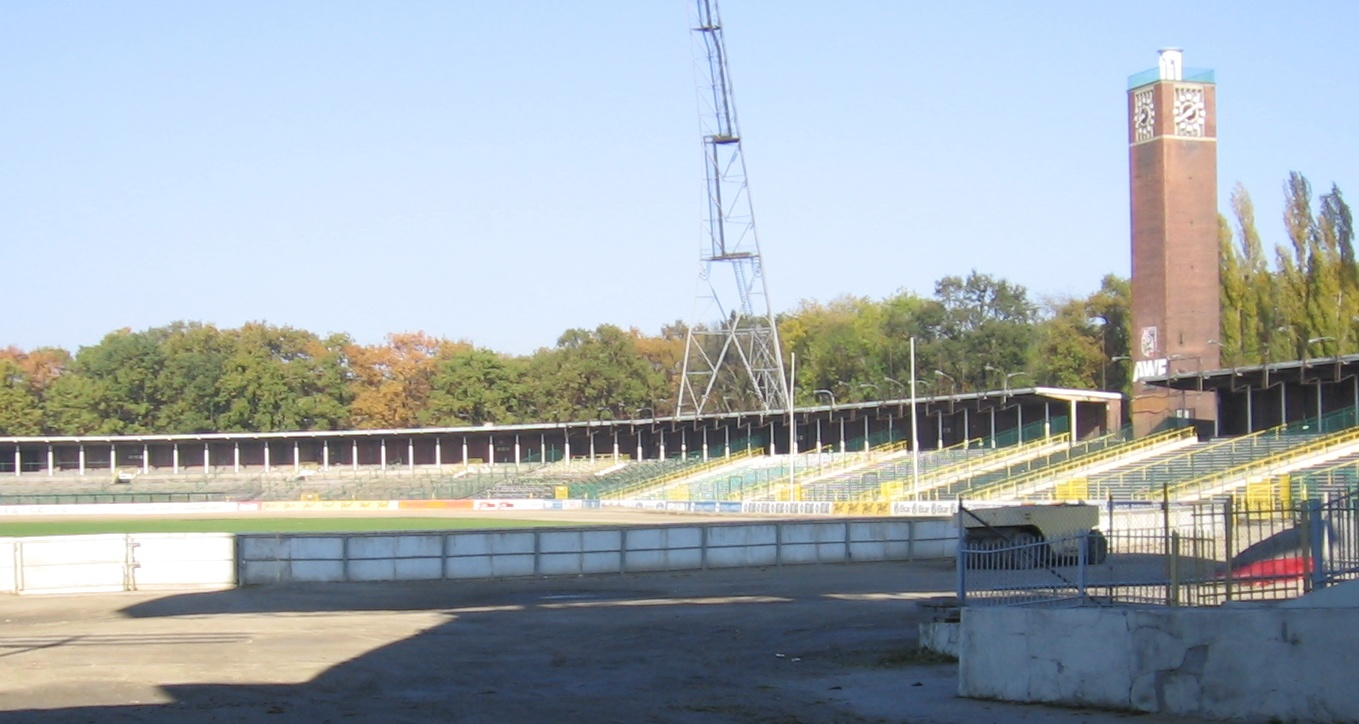
Olympic Stadium in Wrocław.

Two cities were selected to host SWC finals events:

City	Stadium names	Capacity
Gdańsk	Gdańsk Speedway Stadium	15,000
Wrocław	Olympic Stadium	35,000

== Tournament ==
=== Qualifying rounds ===
Qualifying 1

- 1 July 2001
- (Poland) Gdańsk
- Referee: Anthony Steele

Pos.	National team	Pts.
1	Poland	69
2	Great Britain	49
3	Finland	22
4	Germany	15

Qualifying round 2

- 2 July 2001
- (Poland) Gdańsk
- Referee: Wojciech Grodzki

Pos.	National team	Pts.
1	Sweden	57
2	Denmark	48
3	Russia	31
4	Slovenia	12

Qualifying 3

- 3 July 2001
- (Poland) Gdańsk
- Referee: Anthony Steele

Pos.	National team	Pts.
1	Australia	56
2	United States	41
3	Czech Republic	35
4	Hungary	16

==== Q1 details ====
Placing	Team / Rider name	Total	1	2	3	4	5	6	7	8	9	10	11	12	13	14	15	16	17	18	19	20	Pts	21	22	23	24
1	Poland	69	2	4	7	10	13	16	18	21	24	26	29	30	33	36	39	41	44	47	50	53		56	59	60	69
1	(1) Tomasz Gollob	14				3					3					3					3		12				2
1	(2) Piotr Protasiewicz	13			3					3					3					3			12			1
1	(3) Mirosław Kowalik	7		2					2					1				2					7
1	(4) Sebastian Ułamek	14	2					3					3						3				11		3
1	(5) Krzysztof Cegielski	14					3					2					3					3	11	3
2	Great Britain	49	3	6	6	8	10	11	14	16	16	19	23	26	28	29	30	33	33	35	37	39		41	43	46	49
2	(1) Mark Loram	17	3						3				4J		2						2		14				3
2	(2) Carl Stonehewer	9		3				1								1				2			7	2
2	(3) Lee Richardson	13				2				2				3				3	E4				10			3
2	(4) Paul Hurry	0			0						0		-					-					0
2	(5) Gary Havelock	10					2					3					1					2	8		2
3	Finland	22	1	2	3	4	5	5	5	5	7	9	10	12	13	13	15	15	16	17	18	19		19	20	22	22
3	(1) Kaj Laukkanen	8			1			0				2J		2							1		6			2
3	(2) Kauko Nieminen	5				1			E4				1							1		1	4		1
3	(3) Joonas Kylmäkorpi	7		1							2				1		2		1				7				0
3	(4) Tomi Reima	1	1							0						0		0					1	0
3	(5) Petri Kokko	1					1					-					-					-	1
4	Germany	15	0	0	2	2	2	4	5	6	7	7	7	7	7	9	9	10	12	12	12	12		14	14	14	15
4	(1) Gerd Riss	1		0						1			0								0		1		0
4	(2) Jorg Pingel	1	0								1			0			0			0			1	-
4	(3) Joachim Kugelmann	10			2				1							2			2				7	2J			1
4	(4) Herbert Rudolf	3				0		2							0			1				0	3			0
4	(5) Steffen Mell	0					0					0					-					-	0
Placing	Team / Rider name	Total	1	2	3	4	5	6	7	8	9	10	11	12	13	14	15	16	17	18	19	20	Pts	21	22	23	24

M - exclusion for exceeding two minute time allowance • T - exclusion for touching the tapes • X - other exclusion • E - retired or mechanical failure • F - fell

Helmet colours were permanent for each team (red, blue, white and yellow/black). Colours in tables show gate positions:
gate A – inside	gate B	gate C	gate D – outside

Heat after heat

Extended content
1. Loram, Ułamek, Reima, Pingel
2. Stonehewer, Mir.Kowalik, Kylmaekorpi, Riss
3. Protasiewicz, Kugelmann, Laukkanen, Hurry
4. T.Gollob, Richardson, Nieminen, Rudolph
5. Cegielski, Havelock, Kokko, Mell
6. Ułamek, Rudolph, Stonehewer, Laukkanen
7. Loram, Mir.Kowalik, Kugelmann, Nieminen (e4)
8. Protasiewicz, Richardson, Riss, Reima
9. T.Gollob, Kylmaekorpi, Pingel, Hurry
10. Havelock, Cegielski, Laukkanen (joker), Mell
11. Ułamek, Loram (joker), Nieminen, Riss
12. Richardson, Laukkanen, Mir.Kowalik, Pingel
13. Protasiewicz, Loram, Kylmaekorpi, Rudolph
14. T.Gollob, Kugelmann, Stonehewer, Reima
15. Cegielski, Kylmaekorpi, Havelock, Pingel
16. Richardson, Mir.Kowalik, Rudolph, Reima
17. Ułamek, Kugelmann, Kylmaekorpi, Richardson (e4)
18. Protasiewicz, Stonehewer, Nieminen, Pingel
19. T.Gollob, Loram, Laukkanen, Riss
20. Cegielski, Havelock, Nieminen, Mell
21. Cegielski, Stonehewer, Kugelmann (joker), Reima
22. Ułamek, Havelock, Nieminen, Riss
23. Richardson, Laukkanen, Protasiewicz, Rudolph
24. Loram, T.Gollob, Kugelmann, Kylmaekorpi

==== Q2 details ====
Placing	Team / Rider name	Total	1	2	3	4	5	6	7	8	9	10	11	12	13	14	15	16	17	18	19	20	Pts	21	22	23	24
1	Sweden	57	2	5	6	9	11	13	16	17	18	21	23	25	28	31	34	36	38	40	43	46		49	51	54	57
1	(1) Tony Rickardsson	14	2						3						3						3		11				3
1	(2) Mikael Karlsson	12		3				2								3				2			10		2
1	(3) Jimmy Nilsen	11				3				1				2					2				8	3
1	(4) Niklas Klingberg	6			1						1		2					2					6
1	(5) Andreas Jonsson	14					2					3					3					3	11			3
2	Denmark	48	3	5	5	7	10	13	15	18	21	22	22	25	27	28	30	31	32	38	39	40		42	45	46	48
2	(1) Nicki Pedersen	15			0			3						3						6J	1		13				2
2	(2) Hans Clausen	4				2			2				E							-			4
2	(3) Jesper B. Jensen	12		2							3				2				1				8		3	1
2	(4) Brian Andersen	10	3							3						1		1					8	2		-
2	(5) Bjarne Pedersen	7					3					1					2					1	7	-
3	Russia	31	1	1	4	4	5	6	7	9	9	11	14	14	14	16	17	20	23	23	25	25		27	28	30	31
3	(1) Roman Povazhny	11		0						2			3					3			2		10				1
3	(2) Rinat Mardanshin	1	1								0			0						0			1	-
3	(3) Sergey Darkin	11			3				1							2			3				9			2
3	(4) Eduard Shaihullin	3				0		1							0			-					1	2J
3	(5) Sergey Kuzin	5					1					2					1					0	5		1
4	Slovenia	12	0	1	3	4	4	4	4	4	6	6	7	8	9	9	9	9	9	10	10	12		12	12	12	12
4	(1) Matej Ferjan	3				1					2					0					XF		3		0	E
4	(2) Izak Šantej	5			2					0			1		1					1			5				0
4	(3) Jernej Kolenko	4		1					0					1				0				2	4	F2		-
4	(4) Primoz Klenovsek	0	0					0					-						0				0	-
4	(5) Primoz Legan	0					0					0					0					-	0
Placing	Team / Rider name	Total	1	2	3	4	5	6	7	8	9	10	11	12	13	14	15	16	17	18	19	20	Pts	21	22	23	24

M - exclusion for exceeding two minute time allowance • T - exclusion for touching the tapes • X - other exclusion • E - retired or mechanical failure • F - fell

Helmet colours were permanent for each team (red, blue, white and yellow/black). Colours in tables show gate positions:
gate A – inside	gate B	gate C	gate D – outside

Heat after heat

Extended content
1. B.Andersen, Rickardsson, Mardanszin, Klenovsek
2. M.Karlsson, Jensen, Kolenko, Poważnyj
3. Darkin, Santej, Klingberg, N.Pedersen
4. Nilsen, Clausen, Ferjan, Szajchulin
5. B.Pedersen, Jonsson, Kuzin, Legan
6. N.Pedersen, M.Karlsson, Szajchulin, Klenovsek
7. Rickardsson, Clausen, Darkin, Kolenko
8. B.Andersen, Poważnyj, Nilsen, Santej
9. Jensen, Ferjan, Klingberg, Mardanszin
10. Jonsson, Kuzin, B.Pedersen, Legan
11. Poważnyj, Klingberg, Santej, Clausen
12. N.Pedersen, Nilsen, Kolenko, Mardanszin
13. Rickardsson, Jensen, Santej, Szajchulin
14. M.Karlsson, Darkin, B.Andersen, Ferjan
15. Jonsson, B.Pedersen, Kuzin, Legan
16. Poważnyj, Klingberg, B.Andersen, Kolenko
17. Darkin, Nilsen, Jensen, Klenovsek
18. N.Pedersen (joker), M.Karlsson, Santej, Mardanszin
19. Rickardsson, Poważnyj, N.Pedersen, Ferjan (Fx)
20. Jonsson, Kolenko, B.Pedersen, Kuzin
21. Nilsen, B.Andersen, Szajchulin (joker), Kolenko (F2)
22. Jensen, M.Karlsson, Kuzin, Ferjan
23. Jonsson, Darkin, Jensen, Ferjan
24. Rickardsson, N.Pedersen, Poważnyj, Santej

==== Q3 details ====
Placing	Team / Rider name	Total	1	2	3	4	5	6	7	8	9	10	11	12	13	14	15	16	17	18	19	20	Pts	21	22	23	24
1	Australia	56	3	4	7	8	11	14	14	17	20	23	24	27	30	32	33	35	38	38	41	44		47	50	53	56
1	(1) Jason Crump	15			3			3						3							3		12				3
1	(2) Jason Lyons	2				1			0				1							E			2
1	(3) Leigh Adams	13		1							3				3				3				10			3
1	(4) Ryan Sullivan	13	3							3						2		2					10		3
1	(5) Todd Wiltshire	13					3					3					1					3	10	3
2	United States	41	2	4	4	7	9	9	12	14	16	17	21	23	23	23	26	29	31	33	35	36		37	39	41	41
2	(1) Sam Ermolenko	10		2						2			4J								2		10				0
2	(2) Greg Hancock	10	2								2			2						2			8			2
2	(3) Billy Janniro	5			0				3							0			2				5
2	(4) Brent Werner	7				3		0							0			3					6	1
2	(5) John Cook	9					2					1					3					1	9		2
3	Czech Republic	35	1	4	6	6	7	9	11	11	12	14	17	17	19	22	24	25	26	29	29	31		31	32	33	35
3	(1) Marian Jirout	5	1						2						2						0		5	-
3	(2) Bohumil Brhel	13		3				2								3				3			11	0J			2
3	(3) Michal Makovský	0				0				Fx				0					-				0
3	(4) Aleš Dryml, Jr.	8			2						1		3					1					7		1
3	(5) Antonín Kasper, Jr.	9					1					2					2		1			2	8			1
4	Hungary	16	0	0	1	3	3	4	5	6	6	6	6	7	8	9	9	9	9	10	11	11		15	15	15	16
4	(1) Robert Nagy	9				2					0					1					1		4	4J			1
4	(2) Attila Stefani	4			1					1					1		0			1			4			0
4	(3) Norbert Magosi	2		T					1					1				0					2		0
4	(4) Laszlo Szatmari	1	0					1					0						X				1	-
4	(5) Gábor Szegvári	0					0					0					-					0	0
Placing	Team / Rider name	Total	1	2	3	4	5	6	7	8	9	10	11	12	13	14	15	16	17	18	19	20	Pts	21	22	23	24

M - exclusion for exceeding two minute time allowance • T - exclusion for touching the tapes • X - other exclusion • E - retired or mechanical failure • F - fell

Helmet colours were permanent for each team (red, blue, white and yellow/black). Colours in tables show gate positions:
gate A – inside	gate B	gate C	gate D – outside

Heat after heat

Extended content
1. Sullivan, Hancock, Jirout, Szatmari
2. Brhel, Ermolenko, Adams, Magosi (T)
3. Crump, A.Dryml jr., Stefani, Janniro
4. Werner, Nagy, Lyons, Makovsky
5. Wiltshire, Cook, Kasper jr., Szegvari
6. Crump, Brhel, Szatmari, Werner
7. Janniro, Jirout, Magosi, Lyons
8. Sullivan, Ermolenko, Stefani, Makovsky (Fx)
9. Adams, Hancock, A.Dryml jr., Nagy
10. Wiltshire, Kasper jr., Cook, Szegvari
11. A.Dryml jr., Ermolenko (joker), Lyons, Szatmari
12. Crump, Hancock, Magosi, Makovsky
13. Adams, Jirout, Stefani, Werner
14. Brhel, Sullivan, Nagy, Janniro
15. Cook, Kasper jr., Wiltshire, Stefani
16. Werner, Sullivan, A.Dryml jr., Magosi
17. Adams, Janniro, Kasper jr., Szatmari (Fx)
18. Brhel, Hancock, Stefani, Lyons (e/start)
19. Crump, Ermolenko, Nagy, Jirout
20. Wilshire, Kasper jr., Cook, Szegvari
21. Wiltshire, Nagy (joker), Werner, Brhel (joker)
22. Sullivan, Cook, A.Dryml jr., Magosi
23. Adams, Hancock, Kasper jr., Stefani
24. Crump, Brhel, Nagy, Ermolenko

=== Race-off ===
- 5 July 2001
- (Poland) Olympic Stadium, Wrocław
- Referee: Wojciech Grodzki

Pos.	National team	Pts.
1	Denmark	66
2	United States	65+4
3	Great Britain	65+3
4	Czech Republic	42
5	Russia	20

Placing	Team / Rider name	Total	1	2	3	4	5	6	7	8	9	10	11	12	13	14	15	16	17	18	19	20	21	22	23	24	25
1	Denmark	66	3	5	7	11	15	17	21	23	27	31	34	35	39	43	45	47	48	48	51	54	56	60	61	63	66
1	(1) Nicki Pedersen	18	3								4				4							3		4
1	(2) Hans Clausen	13		2								4				4		2							1
1	(3) Bjarne Pedersen	9			2			2									2		1							2
1	(4) Jesper B. Jensen	14				4			4				3							0							3
1	(5) Brian Andersen	12					4			2				1							3		2
2	United States	65+4	4	8	11	13	15	19	19	19	20	23	24	28	31	31	39	40	44	48	52	53	57	58	61	65	65
2	(1) Greg Hancock	19	4									3		4						4						4
2	(2) Sam Ermolenko	23		4				4							3		8J				4						F1x
2	(3) Brent Werner	8			3				0							0						1	4
2	(4) Billy Janniro	4				2				0							-	1						1
2	(5) John Cook	11					2				1		1						4						3
3	Great Britain	65 +3	2	3	7	7	10	10	13	17	20	23	26	29	31	33	36	39	41	44	47	51	54	56	58	61	65
3	(1) Mark Loram	18	2							4						2			2			4J					4
3	(2) Carl Stonehewer	16		1							3			3			3			3			3
3	(3) Lee Richardson	15			4							3	3								3			2
3	(4) Paul Hurry	2				X		N						-								-			2
3	(5) Gary Havelock	14					3		3						2			3								3
4	Czech Republic	42	1	4	4	7	7	13	15	18	20	20	20	20	21	24	24	28	28	30	31	35	36	38	42	42	42
4	(1) Antonín Kasper, Jr.	10	1						2								0			2	1				4
4	(2) Bohumil Brhel	16		3				6J		3			0									4				M
4	(3) Aleš Dryml, Jr.	9			0						2			0		3		4									E4
4	(4) Marian Jirout	7				3						E5			1				0				1	2
4	(5) Michal Makovský	0					Fx	-								-				-				-
5	Russia	20	0	0	1	1	2	3	4	5	5	6	8	10	10	12	13	13	16	17	17	17	17	17	17	18	20
5	(1) Roman Povazhny	5	0					1					2			2J		X					0
5	(2) Sergey Darkin	6		E4					1					2					3					0
5	(3) Eduard Shaihullin	3			1					1					Fx					1					0
5	(4) Oleg Kurguskin	1				M					0					-					0					1
5	(5) Sergey Kuzin	5					1					1					1					0					2
Placing	Team / Rider name	Total	1	2	3	4	5	6	7	8	9	10	11	12	13	14	15	16	17	18	19	20	21	22	23	24	25

M - exclusion for exceeding two minute time allowance • T - exclusion for touching the tapes • X - other exclusion • E - retired or mechanical failure • F - fell

Helmet colours were permanent for each team (red, blue, white, yellow/black and green). Colours in tables show gate positions:
gate A – inside	gate B	gate C	gate D	gate E – outside

Heat after heat

Extended content
1. Hancock, N.Pedersen, Loram, Kasper jr., Poważnyj
2. Ermolenko, Brhel, Clausen, Stonehewer, Darkin(e4)
3. Richardson, Werner, B.Pedersen, Szajchulin, A.Dryml jr.
4. Jensen, Jirout, Janniro, Kurguskin(X2), Hurry(Fx)
5. B.Andersen, Havelock, Cook, Kuzin, Makovsky(Fx)
6. Ermolenko, Brhel(joker), B.Pedersen, Poważnyj, Hurry(N)
7. Jensen, Havelock, Kasper jr., Darkin, Werner
8. Loram, Brhel, B.Andersen, Szajchulin, Janniro
9. N.Pedersen, Stonehewer, A.Dryml jr., Cook, Kurguskin
10. Clausen, Hancock, Richardson, Kuzin, Jirout(d5)
11. Richardson, Jensen, Poważnyj, Cook, Brhel
12. Hancock, Stonehewer, Darkin, B.Andersen, A.Dryml jr.
13. N.Pedersen, Ermolenko, Havelock, Jirout, Szajchulin(Fx)
14. Clausen, A.Dryml jr., Loram, Poważnyj, Werner
15. Ermolenko(joker), Stonehewer, B.Pedersen, Kuzin, Kasper jr.
16. A.Dryml jr., Havelock, Clausen, Janniro, Poważnyj(X)
17. Cook, Darkin, Loram, B.Pedersen, Jirout
18. Hancock, Stonehewer, Kasper jr., Szajchulin, Jensen
19. Ermolenko, B.Andersen, Richardson, Kasper jr., Kurguskin
20. Brhel, N.Pedersen, Loram, Werner, Kuzin
21. Werner, Stonehewer, B.Andersen, Jirout, Poważnyj
22. N.Pedersen, Richardson, Jirout, Janniro, Darkin
23. Kasper jr., Cook, Hurry, Clausen, Szajchulin
24. Hancock, Havelock, B.Pedersen, Kurguskin, Brhel(X)
25. Loram, Jensen, Kuzin, A.Dryml jr.(e4), Ermolenko(F1x)

=== Final ===
The final took place on 7 July at the Olympic Stadium in Wrocław, Poland. Australia won the final and their rider Jason Crump became the first rider since the legendary Swedish rider Ove Fundin to go through the entire tournament undefeated.

- 7 July 2001 (Poland) Olympic Stadium, Wrocław
- Referee: Anthony Steele

==== Final scores ====
Pos.	National team	Pts.
1	Australia	68
2	Poland	65
3	Sweden	51
4	Denmark	44
5	United States	30

==== Heat details ====
Placing	Team / Rider name	Total	1	2	3	4	5	6	7	8	9	10	11	12	13	14	15	16	17	18	19	20	21	22	23	24	25
1	Australia	68	4	7	10	14	17	17	21	25	25	26	29	33	35	39	42	45	49	51	52	54	56	57	60	64	68
1	(1) Jason Crump	20	4							4						4			4								4
1	(2) Todd Wiltshire	10		3							0						3			2			2
1	(3) Craig Boyce	9			3							1	3								1			1
1	(4) Ryan Sullivan	13				4		0						4								2			3
1	(5) Leigh Adams	16					3		4						2			3								4
2	Poland	65	2	4	8	8	9	11	12	15	19	27	28	29	33	35	36	38	40	44	48	51	55	58	62	65	65
2	(1) Krzysztof Cegielski	11	2					2					1					2					4
2	(2) Piotr Protasiewicz	9		2					1					1					2					3
2	(3) Tomasz Gollob	27			4					3		8J			4					4					4
2	(4) Sebastian Ułamek	13				T					4					2					4					3
2	(5) Jacek Krzyżaniak	5					1					-					1					3					X
3	Sweden	51	0	0	4	7	11	15	18	19	22	25	29	32	32	32	36	40	43	44	44	45	46	48	48	48	51
3	(1) Jimmy Nilsen	7	0						3								4				0				E
3	(2) Mikael Karlsson	8		M						1			4									1		2		0
3	(3) Tony Rickardsson	17			4						3			3				4									3
3	(4) Niklas Klingberg	10				3						3			E				3				1
3	(5) Andreas Jonsson	9					4	4								X				1				-
4	Denmark	44	1	2	2	4	8	9	11	13	15	17	17	17	20	23	25	26	27	27	29	33	36	40	41	43	44
4	(1) Nicki Pedersen	16	1								2	2			3							4		4
4	(2) Bjarne Pedersen	6		1								-				3		1							1
4	(3) Hans Clausen	6			0			1									2		1							2
4	(4) Jesper B. Jensen	5				2			2				0							0							1
4	(5) Brian Andersen	11					4J			2				0							2		3
5	United States	30	3	7	8	9	9	12	12	12	13	13	15	17	18	19	19	19	19	22	25	25	25	25	27	28	30
5	(1) Greg Hancock	9	3									0		2			0			3						1
5	(2) Billy Hamill	13		4				3							1						3		EJ				2
5	(3) Brent Werner	2			1				0							1						0	-
5	(4) Billy Janniro	1				1				0							-	0						0
5	(5) John Cook	5					0				1		2						E						2
Placing	Team / Rider name	Total	1	2	3	4	5	6	7	8	9	10	11	12	13	14	15	16	17	18	19	20	21	22	23	24	25

M - exclusion for exceeding two minute time allowance • T - exclusion for touching the tapes • X - other exclusion • E - retired or mechanical failure • F - fell

Helmet colours were permanent for each team (red, blue, white, yellow/black and green). Colours in tables show gate positions:
gate A – inside	gate B	gate C	gate D	gate E – outside

Heat by heat

Extended content
1. Crump, Hancock, Cegielski, N.Pedersen, Nilsen
2. Hamill, Wiltshire, Protasiewicz, B.Pedersen, M.Karlsson(x2)
3. T.Gollob, Boyce, Rickardsson, Werner, Clausen
4. Sullivan, Klingberg, Jensen, Janniro, Ułamek(T)
5. Jonsson, Adams, B.Andersen(joker), Krzyżaniak, Cook
6. Jonsson, Hamill, Cegielski, Clausen, Sullivan
7. Adams, Nilsen, Jensen, Protasiewicz, Werner
8. Crump, T.Gollob, B.Andersen, M.Karlsson, Janniro
9. Ułamek, Rickardsson, N.Pedersen, Cook, Wiltshire
10. T.Gollob(joker), Klingberg, N.Pedersen, Boyce, Hancock
11. M.Karlsson, Boyce, Cook, Cegielski, Jensen
12. Sullivan, Rickardsson, Hancock, Protasiewicz, B.Andersen
13. T.Gollob, N.Pedersen, Adams, Hamill, Klingberg(e5)
14. Crump, B.Pedersen, Ułamek, Werner, Jonsson(wu)
15. Nilsen, Wiltshire, Clausen, Krzyżaniak, Hancock
16. Rickardsson, Adams, Cegielski, B.Pedersen, Janniro
17. Crump, Klingberg, Protasiewicz, B.Pedersen, Cook(e5)
18. T.Gollob, Hancock, Wiltshire, Jonsson, Jensen
19. Ułamek, Hamill, B.Andersen, Boyce, Nilsen
20. N.Pedersen, Krzyżaniak, Sullivan, M.Karlsson, Cook
21. Cegielski, B.Andersen, Wiltshire, Klingberg, Hamill(joker-e3)
22. N.Pedersen, Protasiewicz, M.Karlsson, Boyce, Janniro
23. T.Gollob, Sullivan, Cook, B.Pedersen, Nilsen(e5)
24. Adams, Ułamek, Clausen, Hancok, M.Karlsson
25. Crump, Rickardsson, Hamill, Jensen, Krzyżaniak(wu)

== Final classification ==
Pos.	National team	Pts.
Gold	Australia	68
Silver	Poland	65
Bronze	Sweden	51
4	Denmark	44
5	United States	30
6	Great Britain	65+3
7	Czech Republic	42
8	Russia	20
9	Finland	22
10	Hungary	16
11	Germany	15
12	Slovenia	12
