= 1996 Speedway World Team Cup =

37th edition of the annual motorcycle speedway World Cup competition

Seasons
- ← 1995 1997 →

The 1996 Speedway World Team Cup was the 37th edition of the FIM Speedway World Team Cup to determine the team world champions.

The final took place on 15 September, at the Rhein-Main Arena in Germany. The Poland team won their seventh title but their first for 27 years having last won the 1969 Speedway World Team Cup.

== First round ==
- 2 June 1996
- (Croatia) Mladost Stadum, Prelog

1st	2nd	3rd
Russia 42; 1.Oleg Kurguskin (3,3,3,3,3,-) - 15; 2.Sergey Darkin (3,3,3,3,t/3) - 15; 3.Sergey Jeroshin (3,f/x,3,3,3) - 12	Croatia 29; 4.Zlatko Kržnarič (2,1,2,3,3,2) - 13; 5.Krunoslav Žganec (0,3,1,3,2,2) - 11; 6.Renato Kušter (2,1,1,1,*,*) - 5	Netherlands 23; 7.Patrick Verbrugge (e,f/x,2,2,1,e) - 5; 8.Rob Steman (2,3,3,2,2,2) - 14; 9.Jan van Deijk - (1,2,*,1,*) - 4

4th	5th	track reserve
France 16; 13.Jerome Georgese (1,1,1,0,0,2) - 5; 14.Thierry Bouin (0,0,0,*,1,*) - 1; 15.Christophe Dubernard (2,2,1,2,2,1) - 10	Bulgaria 9; 10.Nikolai Manev (1,2,2,1,-,1) - 7; 11.Rudolf Valentinov (1,1,0,f/x,-) - 2; 12.Milen Manev (e,0,t,0,0,e) - 0	17.Želko Feher (-,-,1,-,-,-) - 1; 18.Tomaš Oletič - ns

New Zealand and Finland withdrew

Russia and Croatia to second round

== Second round ==
- 30 June 1996
- (Slovenia) Ilirija Sports Park, Ljubljana

Placing	Pair / Rider Name	Total	1	2	3	4	5	6	7	8	9	10	11	12	13	14	15	16	17	18	19	20	21	22
1	Russia	25							10							19							25
1	(9) Oleg Kurguskin	12			2			2				2		3			3					T
1	(10) Sergey Darkin	9			3			3				3		F			-					-
1	(19) Roman Povazhny	4												1			2					1
2	Ukraine	22							8							15							22
2	(5) Aleksandr Lyatosinsky	2		-			-			0					-				-			2
2	(6) Igor Marko	11		2			3			3					3				F			-
2	(17) Vladimir Trofimov	9		3			0								1				2			3
3	Latvia	21							4							11							21
3	(3) Nikolay Kokin	8	X				2				2			X				2			2
3	(4) Vladimir Voronkov	13	1				1				3			2				3			3
3	(16) Aleksandr Biznya	0
4	Italy	19							10							14							19
4	(13) Alessandro Milanese	0
4	(14) Andrea Maida	11				3			3			0				2			3		F
4	(21) Valentino Furlanetto	8				2			2			1				1			1		1
5	Slovenia	16							2							6							16
5	(7) Gregor Pintar	1		1				0			-					0				-			-
5	(8) Krešo Omerzel	7		0				1			1					-				3			2
5	(18) Gerhard Lekse	8									0					3				2			3
6	Austria	14							6							12							14
6	(1) Andreas Bossner	11	3			1				2			3				1			1
6	(2) Helmut Lercher	3	2			0				1			0				-			-
6	(15) Thomas Stadler	0															0			0
7	Croatia	9							2							7							9
7	(11) Zlatko Krznraric	6			0				1				2		2			0					1
7	(12) Krunoslav Zganec	2			1				0				1		0			-					-
7	(20) Renato Kuster	1																1					0
Placing	Pair / Rider Name	Total	1	2	3	4	5	6	7	8	9	10	11	12	13	14	15	16	17	18	19	20	21	22

m - exclusion for exceeding two minute time allowance • t - exclusion for touching the tapes • x - other exclusion • e - retired or mechanical failure • f - fell
ns - non-starter • nc - non-classify

gate A - inside	gate B	gate C	gate D - outside

Russia and Ukraine to third round

== Third round ==
- 25 August
- (Poland) Stadion Polonii Piła, Piła
- Australia withdrew and were replaced by Poland B

Placing	Pair / Rider Name	Total	1	2	3	4	5	6	7	8	9	10	11	12	13	14	15	16	17	18	19	20	21	22
1	Poland	25							9							18							25
1	(7) Tomasz Gollob	10		1				2			2					3				2			-
1	(8) Piotr Protasiewicz	13		3				3			3					-				1			3
1	(18) Rafal Dobrucki	2														1							1
2	Russia	24							8							16							24
2	(1) Rinat Mardanshin	16	1			3				3			3				3			3
2	(2) Sergey Darkin	8	2			2				0			2				2			0
2	(15) Flyur Kalimullin	0
3	Hungary	19							6							13							19
3	(13) Csaba Hell	10				1			2			2				2			1		2
3	(14) Zoltán Adorján	9				0			3			3				0			2		1
3	(21) Sándor Tihanyi	0
4	Czech Republic	18							5							12							18
4	(5) Tomas Topinka	13		2			1			1					3				3			3
4	(6) Antonín Kasper Jr.	4		0			2			2					-				0			-
4	(17) Bohumil Brhel	1													1							E
5	Norway	15							6							9							15
5	(3) Lars Gunnestad	9	3				3				1			2				-			-
5	(4) Rune Holta	0
5	(16) Tryggve Jensen	6	0				0				0			0				3			3
6	Poland B	13							5							10							13
6	(9) Wiesław Jaguś	9			3			E				-		3			1					2
6	(10) Grzegorz Walasek	4			1			1				1		1			-					E
6	(19) Sebastian Ułamek	0										E					E
7	Ukraine	11							3							6							11
7	(11) Igor Marko	9			2				1				E		2			2					2
7	(12) Vladimir Kolody	0
7	(20) Aleksandr Lyatosinsky	2			0				0				1		0			1					0
Placing	Pair / Rider Name	Total	1	2	3	4	5	6	7	8	9	10	11	12	13	14	15	16	17	18	19	20	21	22

m - exclusion for exceeding two minute time allowance • t - exclusion for touching the tapes • x - other exclusion • e - retired or mechanical failure • f - fell
ns - non-starter • nc - non-classify

gate A - inside	gate B	gate C	gate D - outside

Poland and Russia to World final

== World Final ==
- 15 September 1996
- (Germany) Rhein-Main Arena, Diedenbergen

Placing	Pair / Rider Name	Total	1	2	3	4	5	6	7	8	9	10	11	12	13	14	15	16	17	18	19	20	21	22
1	Poland	27							8							17							27
1	(7) Tomasz Gollob	15		3				2			2					3				2			3
1	(8) Piotr Protasiewicz	0		F				-			-					-				-			-
1	(18) Slawomir Drabik	12						3			3					1				3			2
2	Russia	22							8							18							22
2	(1) Rinat Mardanshin	13	3			1				3			3				2			1
2	(2) Sergey Darkin	4	2			2				-			-				-			-
2	(15) Oleg Kurguskin	5								2			2				1			0
3	Denmark	21							6							14							21
3	(9) Brian Andersen	16			3			1				3		3			3					3
3	(10) Jesper B. Jensen	4			2			0				1		-			-					1
3	(19) Nicki Pedersen	1												1			0
4	Germany	20							8							12							20
4	(13) Gerd Riss	14				3			3			F				2			3		3
4	(14) Robert Barth	6				0			2			2				-			2		E
4	(21) Robbie Kessler	0														0
5	Sweden	14							3							6							14
5	(3) Niklas Klingberg	7	0				E				1			2				2			2
5	(4) Stefan Dannö	7	1				2				-			0				3			1
5	(16) Daniel Andersson	0									0
6	England	12							6							9							12
6	(5) Paul Thorp	9		2			3			0					2				0			2
6	(6) Sean Wilson	3		1			E			1					X				1			E
6	(17) Scott Nicholls	0
7	Hungary	9							2							7							9
7	(11) Sándor Tihanyi	3			1				0				-		1			-					1
7	(12) Zoltán Adorján	3			0				1				1		-			1					-
7	(20) Norbert Magosi	3											0		3			0					0
Placing	Pair / Rider Name	Total	1	2	3	4	5	6	7	8	9	10	11	12	13	14	15	16	17	18	19	20	21	22

m - exclusion for exceeding two minute time allowance • t - exclusion for touching the tapes • x - other exclusion • e - retired or mechanical failure • f - fell
ns - non-starter • nc - non-classify

gate A - inside	gate B	gate C	gate D - outside

== See also ==
- 1996 Speedway Grand Prix
