= Kai Laukkanen =

Finnish motorcycle speedway rider (born 1975)

Kaj Laukkanen
- Born: 8 April 1975 (age 51)
- Nationality: Finnish

Career history

Poland
- 1999–2000: Piła
- 2001, 2003: Gdańsk
- 2002, 2007: Gniezno
- 2006: Zielona Góra
- 2008: Lublin

Great Britain
- 1996: Long Eaton Speedway
- 1998: Glasgow Tigers
- 1999–2002, 2004: Belle Vue Aces
- 2003: Oxford Cheetahs

Denmark
- 2001–2005: Outrup
- 2007: Fjelsted
- 2008: Grindsted

Sweden Husarerna
- 1992: Husarerna
- 1997–2002: Indianerna

Individual honours
- 2001: Intercontinental Champion
- 1997, 1999, 2000 2001, 2002, 2003 2004, 2006: Finland National Champion

Kai Pekka Laukkanen (born 8 April 1975) is a Finnish former motorcycle speedway rider. He earned 15 caps for the Finland national speedway team.

== Career ==
Laukkanen won the final running of the Intercontinental Final in 2001. He rode in 2004 Speedway Grand Prix and won the bronze medal in 2005 Individual Speedway European Championship.

Laukkanen is an eight-time national champion of Finland after winning the Finnish Individual Speedway Championship in 1997, 1999, 2000, 2001, 2002, 2003, 2004 and 2006.

In the British leagues, Laukkanen started his career with Long Eaton in 1995 but was loaned to Oxford in February 1996. He joined Belle Vue Aces in 1999.

== Major results ==
=== World Championships ===
- Individual World Championship and Speedway Grand Prix
  - 2002 - 28th place (6 pts in one event)
  - 2004 - 20th place (25 pts)
  - 2007 - 23rd place (5 pts in three events)
- Team World Championship (Speedway World Team Cup and Speedway World Cup)
  - 1995 - 7th place in Group B
  - 2000 - 2nd place in Quarter-Final A
  - 2001 - 9th place
  - 2002 - 8th place
  - 2003 - 7th place
  - 2006 - 7th place
  - 2007 - 8th place
  - 2009 - 3rd place in Qualifying round 2
- Individual U-21 World Championship
  - 1995 - (Finland) Tampere - 5th place (12 pts)
  - 1996 - (Germany) Olching - 9th place (7 pts)

=== European Championships ===
- Individual European Championship
  - 2005 - (Italy) Lonigo - 3rd place (12 pts)
- European Pairs Championship
  - 2006 - Finland Withdrew from Final
  - 2007 - (Italy) Terenzano - 4th place (16 pts)
  - 2008 - 5th place in Semi-Final 2

== See also ==
- Finland national speedway team
- List of Speedway Grand Prix riders
