= Sergey Logachev =

Russian speedway rider

- Born: 18 February 1995 (age 31); Blagoveshchensk, Russia
- Nationality: Russian

Career history

Russia
- 2013–2022: Vladivostok
- 2023: Togliatti

Poland
- 2016: Krosno
- 2017: Daugavpils
- 2018: Kraków
- 2019–2021: Rybnik

Individual honours
- 2020, 2021: Russian champion

Sergey Sergeevich Logachev (born 18 February 1995) is a motorcycle speedway rider from Russia. He is twice a champion of Russia.

== Career ==
From 2016 to 2021, Logachev rode in the Team Speedway Polish Championship.

Logachev's career took a significant turn when he won the Russian national championship in 2020. The following year, he successfully defended his title and finished in eighth place during the 2021 Speedway European Championship.

In 2022 and 2023, Logachev won the silver medal in the national championship behind his main rival Grigory Laguta. He joined Vetlanda Speedway for the 2022 Swedish speedway season, but was unable to ride because of the ban on Russian riders due to the Russian invasion of Ukraine.
