= Vladimir Gordeev =

Soviet speedway rider

- Born: 30 November 1950 (age 75); Georgian SSR, Soviet Union
- Nationality: Soviet Georgian

Career history

Soviet Union
- 1969, 1972–1978: Balakovo
- 1970–1971: Tbilisi
- 1979–1986: Leningrad

Individual honours
- 1971, 1973, 1974: Soviet Champion
- 1972, 1976: Russian Champion
- 1974: Continental champion

Team honours
- 1971: World Cup silver

Vladimir Dmitrievich Gordeev (born 30 November 1950) is a Georgian former motorcycle speedway rider. He was a member of the Soviet Union national speedway team.

== Career ==
Gordeev was born on 30 November 1950 in Georgian SSR. He won the Soviet Championship on three occasions in 1971, 1973 and 1974 and the Russian Championship twice, in 1972 and 1976.

Gordeev reached the finals of the Speedway World Championship three times in 1971, 1974 and 1976. However, he was disqualified in the 1971 Individual Speedway World Championship final for using illegal fuel additives.

In 1971, Gordeev was part of the Soviet team that secured the silver medal at the 1971 Speedway World Team Cup.

In 1974, Gordeev won the Continental Speedway final and also competed in two world pairs finals. He toured the United Kingdom with the Soviet team in 1976.

In 1977, Cradley Heathens made an attempt to sign the Gordeev brothers despite the difficulties involved in gaining clearance to race in England.

== Family ==
Gordeev's younger brother Valery is also a former rider who reached the World Final on five occasions.

== World Final appearances ==
=== Individual World Championship ===
- 1970 – (Poland) Wrocław, Olympic Stadium - 13th - 5pts
- 1971 – (Sweden) Gothenburg, Ullevi - dsq - 11pts (later disqualified for illegal fuel additives)
- 1974 – (Sweden) Gothenburg, Ullevi - 16th - 0pts
- 1975 – (England) London, Wembley Stadium - Reserve - 0pts
- 1976 – (Poland) Chorzów, Silesian Stadium - 16th - 0pts

=== World Pairs Championship ===
- 1973 – (Sweden) Borås, Ryavallen (with Anatoly Kuzmin) - 4th - 20pts (10)
- 1974 – (England) Manchester, Hyde Road (with Grigory Khlinovsky) - 6th - 10pts (4)

=== World Team Cup ===
- 1971 – (Poland) Wrocław, Olympic Stadium (with Grigory Khlinovsky / Vladimir Smirnov / Anatoly Kuzmin) - 2nd - 22pts (4)
- 1974 – (Poland) Chorzów, Silesian Stadium (with Vladimir Kalmykov / Mikhail Krasnov / Anatoly Kuzmin) - 4th - 10pts (4)
- 1975 – (West Germany) Norden, Motodrom Halbemond (with Valery Gordeev / Grigory Khlinovsky / Viktor Trofimov) – 2nd – 29pts (5)
- 1976 – (England) London, White City Stadium (with Viktor Trofimov / Valery Gordeev / Grigory Khlinovsky / Vladimir Paznikov) - 4th - 11pts (2)
