= Viktor Kuznetsov (speedway rider) =

Soviet speedway rider

- Born: 27 November 1949 (age 76); Tomsk, Soviet Union
- Nationality: Russian

Career history

Soviet Union
- 1975–1982: Novosibirsk
- 1983–1986: Kiev

Individual honours
- 1985: Soviet Union champion
- 1982: Russian champion
- 1986: Continental Champion
- 1985, 1986: Speedway World Championship finalist

Viktor Kuznetsov (born 27 November 1949) is a former international speedway rider from the Soviet Union.

== Speedway career ==
Kuznetsov won the Russian national championship in 1982.

Kuznetsov reached the final of the Speedway World Championship in the 1985 Individual Speedway World Championship and the 1986 Individual Speedway World Championship.

Kuznetsov was the champion of the Soviet Union, winning the title in 1985.

== World final appearances ==
=== Individual World Championship ===
- 1985 - (England) Bradford, Odsal Stadium - 15th - 2pts
- 1986 - (Poland) Chorzów, Silesian Stadium - 6th - 10pts

=== World Team Cup ===
- 1981 - (West Germany) Olching, Speedway Stadion Olching (with Valery Gordeev / Mikhail Starostin / Nikolay Kornev / Anatoly Maksimov) - 4th - 3pts (2)

=== Speedway Champions Cup ===
- 1986 - (Czechoslovakia) Pardubice - 2th - 13pts
