= Roman Ivanov =

Russian speedway rider

- Born: 19 March 1984 (age 42); Tolyatti, Soviet Union
- Nationality: Russian

Career history

Russia
- 2000–2009: Tolyatti
- 2010–2011: Oktyabrsky

Poland
- 2007: Daugavpils
- 2008: Rivne
- 2009: Opole

Roman Vasilievich Ivanov (Russian: Роман Васильевич Иванов; born 19 March 1984, in Tolyatti, Russia) is a former speedway rider who was a member of Russia national speedway team.

== Career ==
Ivanov spent three years racing in the Team Speedway Polish Championship from 2007 to 2009.

Ivanov represented Russia during the Speedway World Cup in 2001, 2004 and 2007.

== Honours ==
- Team Speedway Championship (Speedway World Cup)
  - 2001 - 4th place in Preliminary round 2 (2 points) (with Latvia team)
  - 2004 - 3rd place in Qualifying round 2 (10 points)
  - 2007 - 6th place - 4th place in Race-Off (4 points)
- Team U-21 World Championship
  - 2005 - 3rd place in Qualifying Round 3 (5 points)
- Individual European Championship
  - 2007 - 8th place in Semi-Final A (8 points)
  - 2008 - 9th place in Semi-Final 3 (8 points)
- European Pairs Championship
  - 2006 (Slovenia) Lendava - 5th place (10 points)
  - 2008 (Austria) Natschbach-Loipersbach - The Final will be on 2008-09-20 (6 points in Semi-Final 1)
- 2006 European Speedway Club Champions' Cup
  - 2006 - 2nd place in Semi-Final 1 (10 points) with Tolyatti
  - 2007 (Hungary) Miskolc - Bronze medal (6 points) with Tolyatti
  - 2008 (Slovenia) Slaný - The Final will be on 2008-09-08 (10 points in Semi-Final)

== See also ==
- Russia national speedway team
