= Vladimir Paznikov =

Soviet speedway rider

- Born: 1 December 1949; Novosibirsk, Soviet Union
- Died: 31 May 2008 (aged 58); Novosibirsk, Russia
- Nationality: Soviet

Career history

Soviet Union
- 1970–1978: Novosibirsk

Individual honours
- 1972: Soviet Champion
- 1973: World finalist

Team honours
- 1973: World Team Cup bronze

Vladimir Vasilievich Paznikov (1 December 1949 - 31 May 2008) was an international Motorcycle speedway rider who rode for the Soviet Union national speedway team and was an accomplished ice speedway rider.

== Career ==
Paznikov reached the final of the Speedway World Championship in 1973.

In 1973, Paznikov was part of the Soviet team that secured the bronze medal at the 1973 Speedway World Team Cup.

After finishing his sports career, Paznikov became the coach of the USSR national speedway team and was a member of the track commission of the national motorcycle association.

On 31 May 2008, while relaxing with friends on a yacht on the Ob River, Paznikov died from suicide by a gunshot wound.

== World Final appearances ==
=== Individual World Championship ===
- 1973 - (Poland) Chorzów, Silesian Stadium - 6th - 8pts

=== World Team Cup ===
- 1973 - (England) London, Wembley Stadium (with Valery Gordeev / Grigory Khlinovsky / Aleksandr Pavlov / Viktor Trofimov) - 3rd - 20pts (5)
- 1976 - (England) London, White City Stadium (with Viktor Trofimov / Valery Gordeev / Grigory Khlinovsky / Vladimir Gordeev) - 4th - 11pts (2)

=== Individual Ice Speedway World Championship ===
- 1972 - (Sweden) Nässjö - 3rd - 12+3pts
- 1973 - (West Germany) Inzell - 3rd - 24pts
