= Russian Individual Speedway Championship =

Soviet/Russian motorcycle speedway event

- Sport: Motorcycle speedway
- Founded: 1960
- Most titles: Russia - Mikhail Starostin (7); Soviet Union - Igor Plekhanov, Valery Gordeev, Mikhail Starostin (all 5)

The Russian Individual Speedway Championship is a motorcycle speedway championship held each year to determine the Russian national champion. Mikhail Starostin holds the record for the most titles with seven. The Soviet Union Individual Speedway Championship was staged injunction with the Russian Individual Speedway Championship from 1959 to its dissolution in 1992.

== Russian Championship 1960–present ==
Year	Winner	Second	Third
1960	Igor Plekhanov	Boris Samorodov	Vsevolod Nerytov
1961	Igor Plekhanov	Boris Samorodov	Farid Szajnurov
1962	Igor Plekhanov	Leonid Drobiazko	Farid Szajnurov
1963	Yuri Chekranov	Leonid Drobiazko	Vladimir Kovalenko
1964	Leo Krayev	Ravil Safarov	Vladimir Kornev
1965	Leo Krayev	Farid Szajnurov	Vyacheslav Dubinin
1966	Farid Szajnurov	Vyacheslav Dubinin	Leo Krayev
1967	Vladimir Kornev	Vladimir Sokolov	Boris Chekanovich
1968	Vladimir Kornev	Vladimir Kononovich	Boris Burlajew
1969	Yury Dubinin	Aleksandr Pavlov	Vladimir Gordeev
1970	Nikolay Aksenov	Aleksandr Pavlov	Anatoly Mironov
1971	Valery Gordeev	Vladimir Zapleshny	Viktor Kalmykov
1972	Vladimir Gordeev	Nikolay Dubvrovin	Victor Nikipelov
1973	Nikolai Kornev	Vladimir Paznikov	Viktor Kalmykov
1974	Victor Nikipelov	Aleksandr Miklaszewski	Viktor Kubanov
1975	Mikhail Starostin	Vladimir Gordeev	Valery Gordeev
1976	Vladimir Gordeev	Mikhail Starostin	Vladimir Nesterov
1977	Valery Gordeev	Viktor Kalmykov	Oleg Rakhimov
1978	Sergey Denisov	Viktor Kuznetsov	Vladimir Gordeev
1979	Alexander Miklashevskii	Sergey Denisov	Aleksandr Halyavin
1980	Alexander Miklashevskii	Vladimir Klychkov	Sergey Denisov
1981	Mikhail Starostin	Viktor Kuznetsov	Sergey Denisov
1982	Viktor Kuznetsov	Mikhail Starostin	Vladimir Klitschkov
1983	Rif Saitgareev	Nikolay Kornev	Valery Gordeev
1984	Rif Saitgareev	Ajrat Fajzullin	Vladimir Klitschkov
1985	Mikhail Starostin	Rinat Mardanshin	Vladimir Klitschkov
1986	Mikhail Starostin	Valery Gordeev	Rif Saitgareev
1987	Mikhail Starostin	Rif Saitgareev	Valery Gordeev
1988	Rif Saitgareev	Mikhail Starostin	Arkady Koronets
1989	Rinat Mardanshin	Mikhail Starostin	Valery Gordeev
1990	Mikhail Starostin	Arkady Koronets	Rinat Mardanshin
1991	Mikhail Starostin	Aleksandr Pavlov	Oleg Volokhov
1992	Sergey Kuzin	Flur Kalimullin	Pavel Chernov
1993	Sergey Kuzin	Oleg Kiptiev	Andrei Volokhov
1994	Oleg Kurguskin	Sergei Yeroshin	Grigory Kharchenko
1995	Rif Saitgareev	Rinat Mardanshin	Sergey Darkin
1996	Rinat Mardanshin	Oleg Kurguskin	Sergey Kuzin
1997	Rinat Mardanshin	Mikhail Starostin	Sergey Kuzin
1998	Rinat Mardanshin	Mikhail Starostin	Eduard Shaihullin
1999	Oleg Kurguskin	Sergey Kuzin	Sergey Darkin
2000	Sergey Darkin	Mikhail Starostin	Eduard Shaihullin
2001	Roman Povazhny	Sergei Filushin	Sergey Kuzin
2002	Sergey Darkin	Oleg Kurguskin	Roman Povazhny
2003	Oleg Kurguskin	Renat Gafurov	Sergey Darkin
2004	Oleg Kurguskin	Denis Gizatullin	Ilya Bondarienko
2005	Evgeny Gomozov	Simon Vlasov	Denis Gizatullin
2006	Renat Gafurov	Denis Gizatullin	Daniil Ivanov
2007	Denis Gizatullin	Renat Gafurov	Sergey Darkin
2008	Denis Gizatullin	Emil Sayfutdinov	Grigory Laguta
2009	Renat Gafurov	Daniil Ivanov	Ilya Bondarienko
2010	Artem Laguta	Grigory Laguta	Denis Gizatullin
2011	Artem Laguta	Daniil Ivanov	Roman Povazhny
2012	Grigory Laguta	Renat Gafurov	Artem Laguta
2013	Grigory Laguta	Andrey Kudriashov	Renat Gafurov
2014	Grigory Laguta	Renat Gafurov	Vitaly Belousov
2015	Andrey Kudriashov	Ilya Chalov	Renat Gafurov
2016	Grigory Laguta	Andrey Kudriashov	Renat Gafurov
2017	Andrey Kudriashov	Renat Gafurov	Artem Laguta
2018	Andrey Kudriashov	Ilya Chalov	Vladimir Borodulin
2019	Andrey Kudriashov	Grigory Laguta	Viktor Kulatov
2020	Sergey Logachev	Vladimir Borodulin	Renat Gafurov
2021	Sergey Logachev	Pavel Laguta	Vladimir Borodulin
2022	Grigory Laguta	Sergey Logachev	Pavel Laguta
2023	Grigory Laguta	Sergey Logachev	Evgeny Saidullin

== Soviet Union Championship 1959–1992 ==
Year	Winner	Second	Third
1959	Farid Szajnurov	Igor Plekhanov	Leonid Drobiazko
1960	Igor Plekhanov	Farid Szajnurov	Boris Samorodov
1961	Igor Plekhanov	Vsevolod Nerytov	Farid Szajnurov
1962	Boris Samorodov	Igor Plekhanov	Leonid Drobiazko
1963	Igor Plekhanov	Boris Samorodov	Leonid Drobiazko
1964	Boris Samorodov	Igor Plekhanov	Viktor Trofimov
1965	Igor Plekhanov	Gennady Kurilenko	Vladimir Sokolov
1966	Farid Szajnurov	Boris Samorodov	Vladimir Sokolov
1967	Viktor Trofimov	Igor Plekhanov	Farid Szajnurov
1968	Igor Plekhanov	Gennady Kurilenko	Vladimir Smirnov
1969	Yury Dubinin	Valeri Klementiev	Viktor Trofimov
1970	Gennady Kurilenko	Vladimir Gordeev	Anatoly Petrovsky
1971	Vladimir Gordeev	Vladimir Paznikov	Vladimir Smirnov
1972	Vladimir Paznikov	Vladimir Zapleshny	Anatoly Kuzmin
1973	Vladimir Gordeev	Valery Gordeev	Nikolai Dubrovin
1974	Vladimir Gordeev	Valery Gordeev	Vladimir Zapleshny
1975	Valery Gordeev	Nikolay Kornev	Vladimir Gordeev
1976	Aleksandr Uchov	Vladimir Paznikov	Nikolay Kornev
1977	Valery Gordeev	Grigory Khlinovsky	Mikhail Starostin
1978	Valery Gordeev	Vladimir Klitschkov	Mikhail Starostin
1979	Mikhail Starostin	Viktor Nikipelov	Valery Gordeev
1980	Mikhail Starostin	Vladimir Gordeev	Nikolay Kornev
1981	Mikhail Starostin	Viktor Kuznetsov	Rif Saitgareev
1982	Rif Saitgareev	Mikhail Starostin	Valery Gordeev
1983	Mikhail Starostin	Nikolay Kornev	Valery Gordeev
1984	Rif Saitgareev	Valery Gordeev	Mikhail Starostin
1985	Viktor Kuznetsov	Valery Gordeev	Vladimir Klitschkov
1986	Valery Gordeev	Vladimir Voronkov	Viktor Kuznetsov
1987	Valery Gordeev	Mikhail Starostin	Oleg Volokhov
1988	Vladimir Trofimov	Rif Saitgareev	Rinat Mardanshin
1989	Rif Saitgareev	Oleg Kurguskin	Grigory Kharchenko
1990	Mikhail Starostin	Rif Saitgareev	Viktor Hajdym
1991	Sergey Kuzin	Oleg Kurguskin	Mikhail Starostin
1992	Sergey Kuzin	Aleksei Morozov	Mikhail Starostin

== See also ==
- Sport in Russia
