= Speedway World Cup Classification =

The table below is a medal classified table of every motorcycle speedway rider to have finished in the top three of a Speedway World Cup competition. In total, 93 different riders from 6 national teams have a SWC medal(s). Updated after the 2026 Speedway World Cup Final.

== Classification ==
Pos	Rider	Team	Total	Gold	Silver	Bronze
1.	Jarosław Hampel	Poland	8	6	2	
2.	Tomasz Gollob	Poland	7	5	2	
3.	Krzysztof Kasprzak	Poland	6	5	1	
4.	Nicki Pedersen	Denmark	12	4	4	4
5.	Niels Kristian Iversen	Denmark	10	4	4	2
6.	Patryk Dudek	Poland	5	4		1
7.	Andreas Jonsson	Sweden	12	3	3	6
8.	Piotr Protasiewicz	Poland	5	3	2	
9.	Rune Holta	Poland	4	3	1	
	Janusz Kołodziej	Poland	4	3	1	
11.	Maciej Janowski	Poland	5	3		2
	Bartosz Zmarzlik	Poland	5	3		2
13.	Jason Crump	Australia	7	2	4	1
14.	Antonio Lindbäck	Sweden	9	2	3	4
15.	Hans N. Andersen	Denmark	8	2	3	3
	Bjarne Pedersen	Denmark	8	2	3	3
17.	Leigh Adams	Australia	5	2	2	1
	Peter Karlsson	Sweden	5	2	2	1
19.	Mikael Max (Karlsson)	Sweden	5	2	1	2
20.	Ryan Sullivan	Australia	4	2	1	1
21.	Grzegorz Walasek	Poland	3	2	1	
	Todd Wiltshire	Australia	3	2	1	
23.	Adrian Miedziński	Poland	2	2		
	Piotr Pawlicki Jr.	Poland	2	2		
25.	Kenneth Bjerre	Denmark	7	1	4	2
26.	Fredrik Lindgren	Sweden	9	1	3	5
27.	Michael Jepsen Jensen	Denmark	2	1	2	
28.	Tony Rickardsson	Sweden	4	1	1	2
29.	Charlie Gjedde	Denmark	3	1	1	1
30.	Jason Lyons	Australia	2	1	1	
	Peter Kildemand	Denmark	2	1	1	
	Linus Sundström	Sweden	2	1	1	
33.	Peter Ljung	Sweden	3	1		2
	Jason Doyle	Australia	3	1		2
35.	David Ruud	Sweden	2	1		1
	Dominik Kubera	Poland	2	1		1
37.	Damian Baliński	Poland	1	1		
	Craig Boyce	Australia	1	1		
	Mikkel Bech Jensen	Denmark	1	1		
	Mads Korneliussen	Denmark	1	1		
	Brady Kurtz	Australia	1	1		
	Ryan Douglas	Australia	1	1		
	Max Fricke	Australia	1	1		
	Rohan Tungate	Australia	1	1		
45.	Chris Holder	Australia	5		3	2
46.	Davey Watt	Australia	4		3	1
47.	Darcy Ward	Australia	4		2	2
48.	Tai Woffinden	Great Britain	2		2	
	Robert Lambert	Great Britain	2		2	
50.	Troy Batchelor	Australia	4		1	3
51.	Mark Loram	Great Britain	2		1	1
	Scott Nicholls	Great Britain	2		1	1
	Ronni Pedersen	Denmark	2		1	1
	Lee Richardson	Great Britain	2		1	1
	Leon Madsen	Denmark	2		1	1
	Mikkel Michelsen	Denmark	2		1	1
	Anders Thomsen	Denmark	2		1	1
58.	Krzysztof Cegielski	Poland	1		1	
	Gary Havelock	Great Britain	1		1	
	Wiesław Jaguś	Poland	1		1	
	Nicolai Klindt	Denmark	1		1	
	Jacek Krzyżaniak	Poland	1		1	
	Jesper B. Monberg (Jensen)	Denmark	1		1	
	David Norris	Great Britain	1		1	
	Sebastian Ułamek	Poland	1		1	
	Danny King	Great Britain	1		1	
	Craig Cook	Great Britain	1		1	
	Dan Bewley	Great Britain	1		1	
	Tom Brennan	Great Britain	1		1	
	Adam Ellis	Great Britain	1		1	
	Frederik Jakobsen	Denmark	1		1	
72.	Jonas Davidsson	Sweden	4			4
73.	Niklas Klingberg	Sweden	2			2
	Emil Sayfutdinov	Russia	2			2
	Grigory Laguta	Russia	2			2
76.	Stefan Andersson	Sweden	1			1
	Chris Harris	Great Britain	1			1
	Chris Louis	Great Britain	1			1
	Daniel Nermark	Sweden	1			1
	Jimmy Nilsen	Sweden	1			1
	Rory Schlein	Australia	1			1
	Magnus Zetterström	Sweden	1			1
	Tomas H. Jonasson	Sweden	1			1
	Artem Laguta	Russia	1			1
	Roman Povazhny	Russia	1			1
	Cameron Woodward	Australia	1			1
	Krzysztof Buczkowski	Poland	1			1
	Przemysław Pawlicki	Poland	1			1
	Vadim Tarasenko	Russia	1			1
	Andrey Kudryashov	Russia	1			1
	Gleb Chugunov	Russia	1			1
	Rasmus Jensen	Denmark	1			1
	Kacper Woryna	Poland	1			1

== See also ==
- Speedway World Championship Classification
