= Sergey Kuzin =

Russian motorcycle speedway rider (born 1971)

- Born: January 18, 1971 (age 55); Balakovo, Soviet Union
- Nationality: Russian

Career history

Soviet Union
- 1988–1994, 2003, 2006–2009: Balakovo
- 1995–2002: Togliatti

Poland
- 2000–2001: Rawicz

Individual honours
- 1991, 1992: Soviet Champion
- 1992, 1993: Russian champion

Sergey Viktorovich Kuzin (Russian: Кузин, Сергей Викторович; born 18 January 1971) is a former motorcycle speedway rider who was a member of Russia national speedway team.

== Career ==
Kuzin was twice the champion of the Soviet Union, winning the title in 1991 and 1992. Following the dissolution of the Soviet Union, he won the Russian national championship in 1992 and 1993.

Kuzin signed for Sheffield Tigers for the 1995 Premier League speedway season, but Sheffield spent the entire season using a rider replacement facility for him.

Kuzin represented Russia during the 2001 and 2002 Speedway World Cup.

Kuzin spent two years racing in the Team Speedway Polish Championship from 2000 to 2001.

== Honours ==
=== World Championships ===
- Team World Championship (Speedway World Team Cup and Speedway World Cup)
  - 2001 - (Poland) - 8th place (5 pts in Race-off)
  - 2002 - (England) - 9th place (2 pts in Event 3)

=== European Championships ===
- Individual European Championship
  - 2001 - (Belgium) Heusden Zolder - 4th place (12 pts)
- European Club Champions' Cup
  - 1999 - (Germany) Diedenbergen - 3rd place (2 pts)

== See also ==
- Russia national speedway team
