= Rinat Mardanshin =

Russian speedway rider

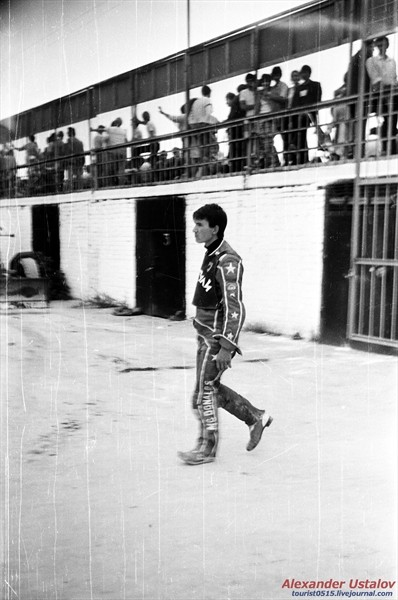
- Born: 24 December 1963; Oktyabrsky, Bashkir ASSR, USSR,
- Died: 19 January 2005 (aged 41); Oktyabrsky, Republic of Bashkortostan, Russia
- Nationality: Russian

Career history

Soviet Union/Russia
- 1982–1985, 1989–1994, 1997–2004: Oktyabrsky
- 1986–1987: Togliatti
- 1988: Rivne

Poland
- 1992: Tarnów
- 1995–1996: Świętochłowice
- 1997, 1999, 2002: Ostrów
- 1998: Częstochowa
- 2000: Opole
- 2001: Warszawa

Individual honours
- 1989, 1996, 1997, 1998: Russian champion
- 1988: Soviet championship bronze

Team honours
- 1996: World Cup silver

Rinat Mukatdisovich Mardanshin (Russian: Ринат Мукатдисович Марданшин; 24 December 1963 – 19 January 2005) was a Russian motorcycle speedway rider of Tatar ethnicity. He represented the Russia national speedway team and was a four-time champion of Russia.

== Career ==
Mardanshin won the bronze medal at the Soviet Union championship in 1988.

After the dissolution of the Soviet Union, Mardanshin went on to win the Russian Championship for three consecutive years from 1996 to 1998. He spent ten years racing in the Team Speedway Polish Championship from 1992 to 2002.

In 1996, Mardanshin won a silver medal at the Speedway World Team Cup held on 15 September at the Rhein-Main Arena in Diedenbergen.

Mardanshin rode in the 2001 Speedway World Cup.

Mardanshin died, on 19 January 2005, at the age of 41, during a routine operation to remove metalwork from his shoulder. It is believed he had a blood clot in his aorta.

== See also ==
- Russia national speedway team
