= Rif Saitgareev =

Russian speedway rider

- Born: 23 August 1960; Ufa, Soviet Union
- Died: 18 June 1996 (aged 35); Ostrów Wielkopolski, Poland
- Nationality: Russian

Career history

Soviet Union
- 1979–1988, 1990–1995: Ufa
- 1989: Lviv

Poland
- 1994, 1996: Ostrów
- 1995: Zielona Góra

Individual honours
- 1991: European Grasstrack Champion
- 1983, 1984, 1988, 1995: Russian Champion
- 1982, 1984, 1989: Soviet Union Champion

Rif Raisovich Saitgareev (23 August 1960 – 18 June 1996) was an international speedway rider from the Soviet Union and Russia.

== Speedway career ==
Saitgareev was four times champion of the Russia after winning the Russian Individual Speedway Championship in 1983, 1984, 1988 and 1995. He was also the Soviet Union Champion in 1982, 1984 and 1989. He participated in several Continental Speedway finals.

Saitgareev spent three years racing in the Team Speedway Polish Championship from 1994 to 1996.

Saitgareev was fatally injured in a track accident at Ostrów Wielkopolski in Poland on 6 June 1996. He was riding in the Polish Team Championship match between Unia Leszno and Iskra Ostrów when he attempted to avoid falling riders in front of him. He lost control of his bike and hit a wall near the entrance gate. He was transferred to hospital with serious head injuries but died 12 days later.

== See also ==
Rider deaths in motorcycle speedway
