= Denis Gizatullin =

Russian speedway rider

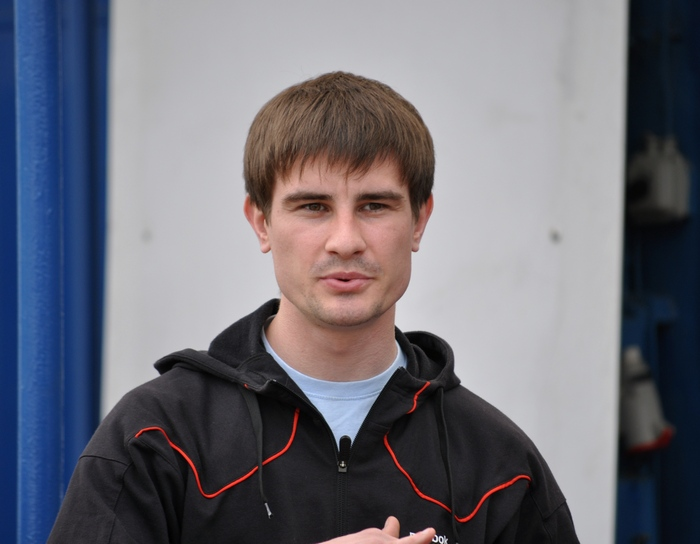
- Born: 11 March 1983 (age 43); Oktiabrsky, Russia
- Nationality: Russian

Career history

Russia
- 2000, 2013: Salavat
- 2001–2007, 2012, 2017–2023: Oktyabrsky
- 2008–2011, 2014–2015: Balakovo
- 2016: Vladivostok

Poland
- 2005, 2014: Daugavpils
- 2006–2009: Rybnik
- 2010–2011: Bydgoszcz
- 2012–2013: Ostrów
- 2014: Łódź
- 2015: Krosno
- 2016–2019: Opole

Great Britain
- 2007, 2012-2013: Eastbourne Eagles

Sweden
- 2006: Kaparna
- 2008: Hammarby

Individual honours
- 2007, 2008: Russian champion
- 2002, 2004: Russian U-21 Champion

Denis Rashitovich Gizatullin (born 11 March 1983 in Oktiabrsky, Russia) is a former international motorcycle speedway rider and former captain of the Russian national team. He earned 15 caps for the Russia national team.

== Career ==
Gizatullin is a two-time Russian champion, having won the Russian national championship in 2007 and 2008.

Gizatullin was part of the Lokomotiv Daugavpils team that first competed in the Polish leagues in 2005. In 2005, he represented Russia in the 2005 World Cup.

Gizatullin first rode in the British leagues in 2007 for Eastbourne Eagles. Although he only rode one match in 2007, he returned to the club for the 2012 and 2013 seasons.

== Career history ==
=== World Championships ===
- Individual U-21 World Championship
  - 2004 (Poland) Wrocław - 14th place (4 points)
- Speedway World Cup
  - 2003 - 8th place (5th place in Race-Off - 2 points)
  - 2005 - 7th place (4th place in Event 1 - 2 points)
  - 2006 - 3rd place in Qualifying Round 1 (13+2 points)
  - 2007 - 6th place (4th place in Race-Off - 0 points)
  - 2008 - Semi-Final 1 will be on 2008-07-12

=== European Championships ===
- Individual European Championship
  - 2007 (Austria) Wiener Neustadt - 6th place (9 points)
  - 2008 (Slovenia) Lendava - The Final will be on 2008-08-23 (Winner of Semi-Final 1)
- Individual U-19 European Championship
  - 2001 (Czech Republic) Pardubice - track reserve (1 point)
  - 2002 (Latvia) Daugavpils - 7th place (8 points)
- European Pairs Championship
  - 2004 - Winner of Semi-Final 2 (9 points)
  - 2005 - 4th place in Semi-Final 1 (5 points)
  - 2007 (Italy) Terenzano - 3rd place (9 points)
- European Club Champions' Cup
  - 2009 - (Poland) Toruń - 3rd place (10 pts) Vladivostok

=== Russian Championships ===
- Russian Individual Speedway Championship
  - 2004 - 2nd place
  - 2005 - 3rd place
  - 2006 - 2nd place
  - 2007 - Champion
  - 2008 - Champion
- Individual U-21 Russian Championship
  - 2002 - Champion
  - 2003 - 2nd place
  - 2004 - Champion
- Team Russian U-21 Championship
  - 2003 - 2nd place
  - 2004 - 2nd place

== See also ==
- Russia national speedway team
- List of Speedway Grand Prix riders
