= László Szatmári =

Hungarian speedway rider

- Born: 18 May 1977 (age 49)
- Nationality: Hungarian

Career history

Poland
- 1999–2002, 2004, 2011: Krosno
- 2003: Łódź
- 2005: Rivne
- 2006–2010: Miskolc

Denmark
- 2007: Holstebro

László Szatmári (born 18 May 1977) is a former motorcycle speedway rider from Hungary. he was a member of Hungary's national team.

== Career ==
Szatmári was called up for the 1999 Speedway World Team Cup squad, and went on to be a member of the Hungarian World Cup team on eight occasions from 2000 to 2009.

== Major results ==
=== World team Championships ===
- 2000 Speedway World Team Cup - =13th
- 2001 Speedway World Cup - 10th
- 2002 Speedway World Cup - 10th
- 2004 Speedway World Cup - 8th
- 2005 Speedway World Cup - =11th
- 2006 Speedway World Cup - =11th
- 2008 Speedway World Cup - 8th
- 2009 Speedway World Cup - =13th

== See also ==
- Hungary national speedway team
