= Sergey Darkin (speedway rider) =

Russian speedway rider

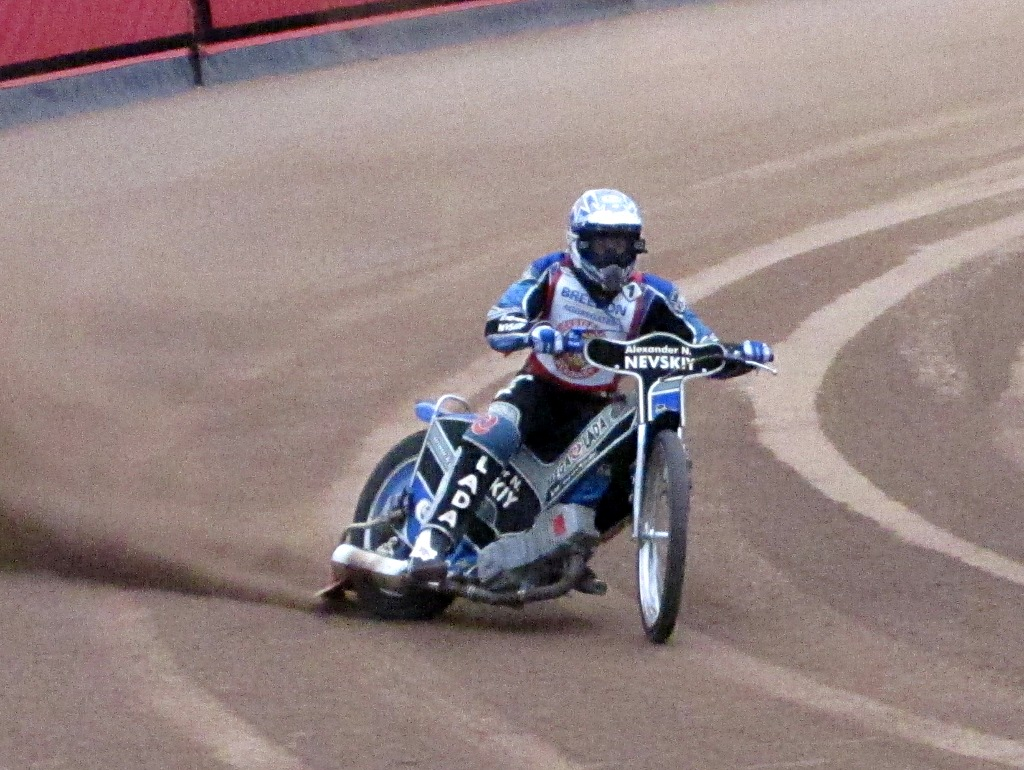
- Born: 18 June 1973 (age 53); Fergana, Uzbekistan
- Nationality: Russian/Uzbek

Career history

Russia
- 1992–2005, 2009–2011, 2014–2017: Togliatti
- 2006–2007: Balakovo
- 2008, 2012–2013: Salavat

Poland
- 1996, 1999: Ostrów
- 1997: Rybnik
- 1998: Kraków
- 2000: Rzeszów
- 2001: Grudziądz
- 2002-2003: Tarnów
- 2006, 2008: Daugavpils
- 2007: Gniezno
- 2009: Miskolc
- 2010: Lublin

Great Britain
- 2001: Eastbourne Eagles
- 2004: Coventry Bees
- 2005: Arena Essex
- 2007: Poole Pirates
- 2011: Leicester Lions
- 2011: Swindon Robins

Individual honours
- 2000, 2002: Russian Champion

Team honours
- 1996: World Cup silver

Sergey Alexandrovich Darkin (born 18 June 1973) is a former motorcycle speedway rider from Uzbekistan, who was a two-time Russian Champion. He earned 17 caps for the Russia national speedway team.

== Biography ==
Born in Fergana, Uzbekistan, Darkin has been a regular member of the Russian World Team Cup squad. He was Russian individual champion in 2000 and 2002. In 1996, Darkin won a silver medal at the Speedway World Team Cup held on 15 September at the Rhein-Main Arena in Diedenbergen.

After riding in the UK for Eastbourne Eagles in 2001, Darkin joined Coventry Bees in the middle of the 2004 season, riding in 15 matches in the Elite League and scoring 111 points at an average of 6.68. He also rode for Arena Essex in 2005 and Poole Pirates in 2007. In September 2005, he suffered serious head injuries in a crash at Togliatti in the European Club Team Champions Cup and was able to return to racing the following year.

Darkin rode for KMZ Lublin in the Polish league, Togliatti in Russia, and signed for Leicester Lions for the 2011 British season, leaving mid-season. He subsequently rode for Swindon Robins in the Elite League.

== Career record ==
=== British leagues ===
Year	Team	League	Matches	Rides	Points	Bonus	Total	Average
2001	Eastbourne Eagles	Elite						
2004	Coventry Bees	Elite	15	73	111	11	122	6.68
2005	Arena Essex	Elite	16	68	87	14	101	5.94
2007	Poole Pirates	Elite	2	6	0	0	0	0.00
2011	Leicester Lions	Premier	21	96	156	10	166	6.92
2011	Swindon Robins	Elite	8	32	23	6	29	3.63

== See also ==
- Russia national speedway team
