= Mikhail Starostin =

Soviet speedway rider

- Born: 24 February 1955 (age 71); Ufa, Soviet Union
- Nationality: Russian

Career history

Soviet Union
- 1974–1992: Ufa

Poland
- 1992: Świętochłowice
- 1993–1995: Kraków
- 1996: Lublin

Individual honours
- 1975, 1981, 1985–1987, 1990–1991: Soviet Union champion
- 1975, 1981, 1985–1987, 1990–1991: Russian champion
- 1979, 1982: Speedway World Championship finalist

Mikhail Leontievich Starostin (born 24 February 1955) is a former international speedway rider from the Soviet Union.

== Speedway career ==
Starostin holds the record for Russian National Championships, winning the title seven times.

In addition, Starostin won the Soviet Union Individual Speedway Championship five times during the period from 1979 until 1990.

Starostin reached the final of the Speedway World Championship in the 1979 Individual Speedway World Championship and the 1982 Individual Speedway World Championship.

Starostin never rode in the British leagues during his career but was able to tour Britain during the latter part of his career following the Revolutions of 1989. He toured the United Kingdom in 1990 and 1998 as part of the Russia national team.

== World final appearances ==
=== Individual World Championship ===
- 1979 – (Poland) Chorzów, Silesian Stadium – 13th – 3pts
- 1982 – (United States) Los Angeles, Memorial Coliseum – 16th – 0pts

=== World Team Cup ===
- 1981 – (West Germany) Olching, Speedway Stadion Olching (with Valery Gordeev / Viktor Kuznetsov / Nikolay Kornev / Anatoly Maksimov) – 4th – 3pts (0)
