= Rhein-Main Arena =

Motorcycle speedway track in Hofheim, Hesse, Germany

- Location: Wildsachsener Str., 65719 Hofheim am Taunus, Germany
- Coordinates: 50°04′06″N 8°24′58″E
- Capacity: 6,500
- Length: 0.400 km (0.249 mi)

The Rhein-Main Arena or Speedway Arena Diedenbergen is an 6,500 capacity motorcycle speedway and Flat track facility in Hofheim am Taunus, Germany. The track is located on the Wildsachsener Str road, on the northern outskirts of the village Diedenbergen and south west outskirts of Hofheim am Taunus. The track hosts the speedway team MSC Diedenbergen who race in the German Team Speedway Championship.

The stadium has been a significant venue for major speedway events, including the final of the 1996 Speedway World Team Cup.

On 12 May 2019, the 396 metre track record was broken by Kevin Wölbert, who recorded 66.41 sec.

Since 2020, it has held a round of the FIM Flat Track World Championship.
