= Russia national speedway team =

Russia
- Nation colour: Blue
- SWC wins: 3 as the Speedway of Nations (2018, 2019, 2020)

The Russia national speedway team are one of the major international motorcycle speedway nations.

== History ==
=== As the Soviet Union ===
The Soviet Union speedway team (which was composed predominantly of Russian riders but also Ukrainian, Latvian and Belarus riders) first competed in the 1961 edition of the Speedway World Team Cup, where they finished second in the East European round. Throughout the history of World Team Cup, the team were regular World Cup contenders from 1961 until their final World Cup in 1983. They reached the final on 12 occasions, winning the silver medal five times, in 1964, 1966, 1971, 1972, 1975 and the bronze medals three times, in 1967, 1969 and 1973.

=== As Russia ===
Following the Dissolution of the Soviet Union at the end of 1991, the riders then competed for their new speedway nations of Latvia, Ukraine and Russia.

The Russian national team first competed in the World Team Cup at the 1993 Speedway World Team Cup, finishing 1st in Group D (the fourth tier of the World Cup). They quickly established themselves as a major contender and reached the World Cup final in 1996 and winning the silver medal. The team experienced a disappointing period from 1997 and although they regularly finished inside the top ten, it was not until 2009 that they reached a final, competing in the 2009 Speedway World Cup final. They then won bronze medala at the 2012 Speedway World Cup and the 2017 Speedway World Cup.

The Speedway of Nations was introduced in 2018 and Russia dominated the first three years of the event, becoming the world champions from 2018 to 2020. However, their run came to an end due to the 2022 Russian invasion of Ukraine. On 6 March 2022, the Fédération Internationale de Motocyclisme banned all Russian motorcycle riders, teams, officials, and competitions.

== Major world medals ==
=== World Team Cup/World Cup/Speedway of Nations ===
Year	Venue	Standings (Pts)	Riders	Pts
1996	(Germany); Diedenbergen; Rhein-Main Arena	1. Poland (27); 2. Russia (22); 3. Denmark (21); 4. Germany (20); 5. Sweden (14); 6. (United Kingdom) Great Britain (12); 4. Hungary (9)	Rinat Mardanshin	13
1996	(Germany); Diedenbergen; Rhein-Main Arena	1. Poland (27); 2. Russia (22); 3. Denmark (21); 4. Germany (20); 5. Sweden (14); 6. (United Kingdom) Great Britain (12); 4. Hungary (9)	Oleg Kurguskin	5
1996	(Germany); Diedenbergen; Rhein-Main Arena	1. Poland (27); 2. Russia (22); 3. Denmark (21); 4. Germany (20); 5. Sweden (14); 6. (United Kingdom) Great Britain (12); 4. Hungary (9)	Sergei Darkin	4
2012	(Sweden); Målilla; G&B Stadium	1. Denmark (39); 2. Australia (36); 3. Russia (30); 4. Sweden (24)	Emil Sayfutdinov	17
2012	(Sweden); Målilla; G&B Stadium	1. Denmark (39); 2. Australia (36); 3. Russia (30); 4. Sweden (24)	Grigory Laguta	8
2012	(Sweden); Målilla; G&B Stadium	1. Denmark (39); 2. Australia (36); 3. Russia (30); 4. Sweden (24)	Artem Laguta	5
2012	(Sweden); Målilla; G&B Stadium	1. Denmark (39); 2. Australia (36); 3. Russia (30); 4. Sweden (24)	Roman Povazhny	0
2017	(Poland); Leszno; Alfred Smoczyk Stadium	1. Poland (50); 2. Sweden (42); 3. Russia (18); 4. (United Kingdom) Great Britain (15)	Emil Sayfutdinov	11
2017	(Poland); Leszno; Alfred Smoczyk Stadium	1. Poland (50); 2. Sweden (42); 3. Russia (18); 4. (United Kingdom) Great Britain (15)	Vadim Tarasenko	3
2017	(Poland); Leszno; Alfred Smoczyk Stadium	1. Poland (50); 2. Sweden (42); 3. Russia (18); 4. (United Kingdom) Great Britain (15)	Gleb Chugunov	3
2017	(Poland); Leszno; Alfred Smoczyk Stadium	1. Poland (50); 2. Sweden (42); 3. Russia (18); 4. (United Kingdom) Great Britain (15)	Andrey Kudriashov	1
2018	(Poland); Wrocław; Stadion Olimpijski	1. Russia (45+3+3); 2. (United Kingdom) Great Britain (46+3); 3. Poland (36+3); 4. Australia (35); 5. Denmark (35); 6. Sweden (32); 7. Germany (23)	Artem Laguta	31+2+2
2018	(Poland); Wrocław; Stadion Olimpijski	1. Russia (45+3+3); 2. (United Kingdom) Great Britain (46+3); 3. Poland (36+3); 4. Australia (35); 5. Denmark (35); 6. Sweden (32); 7. Germany (23)	Emil Sayfutdinov	14+1+1
2019	(Russia); Tolyatti; Anatoly Stepanov Stadium	1. Russia (45+3+5); 2. Poland (47+1); 3. Australia (41+3); 4. Denmark (37); 5. Sweden (35); 6. Germany (30); 7. (United Kingdom) Great Britain (16)	Emil Sayfutdinov	31+1+3
2019	(Russia); Tolyatti; Anatoly Stepanov Stadium	1. Russia (45+3+5); 2. Poland (47+1); 3. Australia (41+3); 4. Denmark (37); 5. Sweden (35); 6. Germany (30); 7. (United Kingdom) Great Britain (16)	Artem Laguta	12+2+2
2019	(Russia); Tolyatti; Anatoly Stepanov Stadium	1. Russia (45+3+5); 2. Poland (47+1); 3. Australia (41+3); 4. Denmark (37); 5. Sweden (35); 6. Germany (30); 7. (United Kingdom) Great Britain (16)	Gleb Chugunov	2
2020	(Poland); Lublin; Stadion MOSiR (Bystrzyca)	1. Russia (23); 2. Poland (23); 3. Denmark (19); 4. Sweden (19); 5. Australia (17); 6. (United Kingdom) Great Britain (12); 7. Czech Republic (11)	Emil Sayfutdinov	15
2020	(Poland); Lublin; Stadion MOSiR (Bystrzyca)	1. Russia (23); 2. Poland (23); 3. Denmark (19); 4. Sweden (19); 5. Australia (17); 6. (United Kingdom) Great Britain (12); 7. Czech Republic (11)	Artem Laguta	8

== International caps ==
Since the advent of the Speedway Grand Prix era, international caps earned by riders is largely restricted to international competitions, whereas previously test matches between two teams were a regular occurrence.

Rider	Caps
Belousov, Vitaly
Bondarenko, Ilja	3
Borodulin, Vladimir	
Chalov, Ilya	
Chugunov, Gleb	
Darkin, Sergey	17
Eroshin, Sergey	
Gafurov, Renat	16
Galeev, Talgat	
Gizatullin, Denis	15
Golubovsky, Victor	
Ivanov, Daniil	
Ivanov, Roman	
Jeroshin, Sergey	
Kalimullin, Flyur	
Kudriashov, Andrey	
Kulakov, Viktor	
Kurguskin, Oleg	
Kuzin, Sergey	
Laguta, Artem	
Laguta, Grigory	
Mardanshin, Rinat	
Povazhny, Roman	21
Saidullin, Evgeny	
Saifutdinov, Denis	
Saifutdinov, Emil	9
Shaihullin, Eduard	
Starostin, Mikhail	
Tarasenko, Vadim	
Vlasov, Simon	
Volokho, Oleg	
Yeroshin, Sergey	
