= 1992 Speedway World Team Cup =

33rd edition of the annual motorcycle speedway World Cup competition

Seasons
- ← 1991 1993 →

The 1992 Speedway World Team Cup was the 33rd edition of the FIM Speedway World Team Cup to determine the team world champions.

The final was staged at the Kumla Speedway in Kumla, Sweden. The United States won their third title.

== First round ==
- 20 April 1992
- (France) Marmande

1st	2nd	3rd
Austria - 33; 13.Andreas Bossner (3,3,3,3,2,3) - 17; 14.Walter Nebel (3,2,0,1,1) - 7; 15.Heinrich Schatzer (2,3,0,2,2) - 9	Netherlands - 27; 7.Rene Elzinga (0,1,1,2,0) - 4; 8.Ron Koppe (1,3,2,1,0) - 7; 9.Rob Steman (3,3,3,3,2,2) - 16	France - 22; 1.Philippe Bergé (3,f,3,3,3,3) - 15; 2.David Ochocki (2,1,0,1,0) - 4; 3.Christophe Dubernard (t,1,1,0,1) - 3

4th	5th
Latvia - 20; 10.Andrey Korolevs (1,2,2,1,3,3) - 12; 11.Yury Brauceys (2,2,2,0,0,0) - 6; 12.Valery Sokolov (0,0,2,0) - 2	Yugoslavia - 17; 4.Gregor Pintar (3,0,1,3,1,2) - 9; 5.Igor Hauptmann (0,0,1,2) - 3; 6.Krešo Omerzel (1,0,0,1,1,2) - 5

- 3 May 1992
- (Socialist Federal Republic of Yugoslavia) Ilirija Sports Park, Ljubljana

1st	2nd	3rd
Austria - 43; Andreas Bossner - 18; Walter Nebel - 16; Heinrich Schatzer - 9	France - 23; Philippe Bergé - 11; Christophe Dubernard - 9 David Ochocki - 3	Yugoslavia - 23; Gerhard Lekse - 11; Gregor Pintar - 8 Krešo Omerzel - 4

4th	5th
Latvia - 15; Andrey Korolevs - 9 Yury Sokolov - 4 Yury Brauceys - 2	Netherlands - 15; Rene Elzinga - 6 Rom Steman - 5 Henk Bangma - 4

Austria to second round

== Second round ==
- 10 May 1992
- (Poland) Alfred Smoczyk Stadium, Leszno

1st	2nd	3rd	4th
Poland - 53; Tomasz Gollob (3,3,3,3,3) - 15; Piotr Świst (3,3,3,3,3) - 15; Jarosław Olszewski (2,-,-,-,1) - 3 Piotr Pawlicki (2,e,3,3,3) - 11; Mirosław Kowalik (3,3,3,3) - 12	Italy - 31; Armando Dal Chiele (2,3,2,0,2) - 9 Andrea Maida (1,3,1,1,1) - 7 Paolo Salvatelli (0,2,1,2,2) - 7 Fabrizio Vesprini (0,-,-,-,-) - 0 Valentino Furlanetto (-,3,2,1,2) - 8	Finland - 24; Vesa Ylinen (1,2,2,2,2) - 9 Juha Moksunen (3,2,2,2,e) - 9 Mika Pellinen (f,1,1,1,1) - 4 Tomi Havu (0,-,0,-,-) - 0 Petri Nurmesniemi (-,1,-,0,-,1) - 2	Austria - 12; Andreas Bössner (1,0,2,1,0) - 4 Walter Nebel (0,0,0,0,0) - 0 Franz Leitner (1,0,1,0,0) - 2 Heinrich Schatzer (2,1,0,2,1) - 6

- 31 May 1992
- (Finland) Seinäjoki Speedway, Seinäjoki

1st	2nd	3rd	4th
Poland - 50; Piotr Świst - 14; Tomasz Gollob - 12; Jacek Krzyżaniak - 11; Mirosław Kowalik - 9 Jarosław Olszewski - 4	Italy - 33; Paolo Salvatelli - 9 Armando Castagna - 9 Armando Dal Chiele - 5 Valentino Furlanetto - 5 Andrea Maida - 5	Finland - 24; Vesa Ylinen - 9 Juha Moksunen - 6 Olli Tyrväinen - 6 Marko Hyyryläinen - 2 Petri Nurmesniemi - 1	Austria - 13; Andreas Bössner - 8 Heinrich Schatzer - 3 Franz Leitner - 1 Thomas Stadler - 1

Poland to third round.

== Third round ==
- 21 July 1992
- (Norway) Elgane, Varhaug

Placing	Team / Rider name	Total	1	2	3	4	5	6	7	8	9	10	11	12	13	14	15	16	Pts	17	18	19	20
1	Norway	34	0	3	4	6	9	10	10	11	14	16	18	18	18	20	22	25		26	29	31	34
1	(9) Lars Gunnestad	12			1		3					2						3	9				3
1	(10) Einar Kyllingstad	10				2		1			3						2		8			2
1	(11) Arnt Førland	11		3						1			2			2			8		3
1	(12) Atle Knudsen	1	0						0					-	X				0	1
1	(19) Robert Langeland	0												0					0
2	Hungary	31	2	3	5	8	9	12	15	15	17	17	18	21	23	24	24	25		28	28	31	31
2	(1) Zoltán Adorján	7				3				0				3				1	7				0
2	(2) Zoltan Hajdu	9			2				3				1				F		6			3
2	(3) József Petrikovics	9		1				3				0			2				6	3
2	(4) Laszlo Bodi	6	2				1				2					1			6		F
2	(17) Antal Kocso	0																	0
4	Poland	30	3	3	6	7	7	7	8	11	12	15	15	16	19	22	25	25		25	27	28	30
4	(13) Piotr Paluch	2		0					1		1							0	2	F
4	(14) Tomasz Gollob	14	3							3		3					3		12				2
4	(15) Miroslaw Kowalik	3			3			F						-		-			3			-
4	(16) Slawomir Drabik	5				F	0						0		3				3		2
4	(20) Jacek Krzyzaniak	6				1								1		3			5			1
4	Germany	26	1	3	3	3	5	7	9	11	11	12	15	17	18	18	19	21		23	24	24	26
4	(5) Gerd Riss	10	1					2					3					2	8				2
4	(6) Robert Barth	7		2			2							2			1		7			0
4	(7) Carsten Pelzmann	5				0			2			1				0			3	2
4	(8) Thomas Meygle	4			0					2	E				1				3		1
4	(18) Klaus Lausch	0																	0
Placing	Team / Rider name	Total	1	2	3	4	5	6	7	8	9	10	11	12	13	14	15	16	Pts	17	18	19	20

M - exclusion for exceeding two-minute time allowance • T - exclusion for touching the tapes • X - other exclusion • E - retired or mechanical failure • F - fell

Helmet colours were permanent for each team (Red, Blue, White and Yellow/Black). Colours in diagrams indicate gate positions:
gate A – inside	gate B	gate C	gate D – outside

- 27 July 1992
- (Germany) Ellermühle Speedway Stadium, Landshut

Placing	Team / Rider name	Total	1	2	3	4	5	6	7	8	9	10	11	12	13	14	15	16	Pts	17	18	19	20
1	Hungary	38	0	3	3	6	9	9	9	12	15	18	18	20	23	26	27	27		30	33	36	38
1	(13) József Petrikovics	9		3					0		3							0	6		3
1	(14) Zoltán Adorján	9	0							3		3					1		7				2
1	(15) Zoltan Hajdu	8			0			-						2		3			5	3
1	(16) Laszlo Bodi	6				3	3						0		-				6			-
1	(20) Antal Kocso	6						0							3				3			3
2	Poland	36	1	1	4	5	5	7	10	12	14	16	18	21	22	24	27	28		30	32	33	36
2	(1) Piotr Świst	8				1				2				3				1	7			1
2	(2) Tomasz Gollob	14			3				3				2				3		11				3
2	(3) Slawomir Drabik	5		0				-				2			1				3		2
2	(4) Robert Sawina	1	1				0				-					-			1	-
2	(17) Jan Krzystyniak	8						2			2					2			6	2
4	Germany	27	3	4	6	8	10	13	15	16	17	17	18	18	20	21	21	24		25	25	27	27
4	(9) Gerd Riss	9			2		2					E						3	7			2
4	(10) Robert Barth	6				2		3			1						0		6		E
4	(11) Carsten Pelzmann	3		1						1			1			-			3	-
4	(12) Klaus Lausch	7	3						2					0	2				7				0
4	(19) Thomas Meygle	2														1			1	1
4	Norway	19	2	4	5	5	6	7	8	8	8	9	12	13	13	13	15	17		17	18	18	19
4	(5) Lars Gunnestad	9	2					1					3					2	8				1
4	(6) Einar Kyllingstad	6		2			1							1			2		6			0
4	(7) Willi Tjessem	0				F			-			-				-			0	-
4	(8) Atle Knudsen	2			1					0	0				0				1		1
4	(18) Robert Langeland	2							1			1				0			2	0
Placing	Team / Rider name	Total	1	2	3	4	5	6	7	8	9	10	11	12	13	14	15	16	Pts	17	18	19	20

M - exclusion for exceeding two-minute time allowance • T - exclusion for touching the tapes • X - other exclusion • E - retired or mechanical failure • F - fell

Helmet colours were permanent for each team (Red, Blue, White and Yellow/Black). Colours in diagrams indicate gate positions:
gate A – inside	gate B	gate C	gate D – outside

== Fourth round ==
- 6 September 1992
- (England) King's Lynn Stadium, King's Lynn

Placing	Team / Rider name	Total	1	2	3	4	5	6	7	8	9	10	11	12	13	14	15	16	Pts	17	18	19	20
1	England	48	3	5	7	10	12	13	15	18	21	23	26	28	31	34	37	40		40	43	45	48
1	(13) Joe Screen	13		2					2		3							3	10		3
1	(14) Mark Loram	13	3							3		2					3		11			2
1	(15) Martin Dugard	3			2			1						-		-			3	-
1	(16) Gary Havelock	14				3	2						3		3				11				3
1	(20) Kelvin Tatum	5												2		3			5	0
2	Australia	35	0	1	4	6	6	8	9	10	12	15	17	20	22	24	26	28		29	31	34	35
2	(1) Leigh Adams	9				2				1				3				2	8				1
2	(2) Craig Boyce	4			3				1				-				-		4		-
2	(3) Jason Lyons	11		1				2				3			2				8			3
2	(4) Shane Parker	3	F				M				-					2			2	1
2	(17) Glenn Doyle	8									2		2				2		6		2
4	Czechoslovakia	23	1	4	4	5	8	11	11	11	12	13	14	14	14	15	15	16		20	20	21	23
4	(5) Zdeněk Tesař	7	1					3					1					1	6			1
4	(6) Bohumil Brhel	8		3			3							0			0		6				2
4	(7) Roman Matoušek	4				1			X			1				1			3	1
4	(8) Václav Milík Sr.	0			F					0	-				-				0	-
4	(18) Petr Vandírek	4									1				0				1	3
4	Hungary	14	2	2	3	3	4	4	7	9	9	9	9	10	11	11	12	12		14	14	14	14
4	(9) Zoltán Adorján	2			1		1					0						0	2			0
4	(10) Sándor Tihanyi	0				0		-			-						-		0	-
4	(11) József Petrikovics	2		0						2			0			0			2		0
4	(12) Antal Kocso	7	2						3					1	1				7				0
4	(19) Róbert Nagy	3						0			0						1		1	2
Placing	Team / Rider name	Total	1	2	3	4	5	6	7	8	9	10	11	12	13	14	15	16	Pts	17	18	19	20

M - exclusion for exceeding two-minute time allowance • T - exclusion for touching the tapes • X - other exclusion • E - retired or mechanical failure • F - fell

Helmet colours were permanent for each team (Red, Blue, White and Yellow/Black). Colours in diagrams indicate gate positions:
gate A – inside	gate B	gate C	gate D – outside

England to World final.

== World Final ==
- 19 September 1992
- (Sweden) Kumla Speedway, Kumla

Placing	Team / Rider name	Total	1	2	3	4	5	6	7	8	9	10	11	12	13	14	15	16	Pts	17	18	19	20
1	United States	39	3	3	4	5	8	10	12	13	15	18	19	22	24	26	27	30		33	36	38	39
1	(1) Sam Ermolenko	10				1				1				3				3	8			2
1	(2) Ronnie Correy	5			1				-				1				-		2	3
1	(3) Billy Hamill	10		0				2				3			2				7		3
1	(4) Greg Hancock	11	3				3				2					2			10				1
1	(17) Bobby Ott	3							2								1		3
2	Sweden	33	1	2	4	7	8	11	12	14	14	16	19	20	20	23	26	26		26	28	31	33
2	(9) Tony Rickardsson	7			2		1					2						0	5		2
2	(10) Per Jonsson	11				3		3			0						3		9				2
2	(11) Henrik Gustafsson	12		1						2			3			3			9			3
2	(12) Jimmy Nilsen	1	1						-					-	-				1	0
2	(19) Peter Nahlin	2							1					1	F				2
4	England	31	2	5	8	10	12	13	13	16	19	20	22	22	25	26	28	29		30	31	31	31
4	(5) Gary Havelock	7	2					1					2					1	6		1
4	(6) Mark Loram	7		3			2							0			2		7			0
4	(7) Joe Screen	2				2			F			-				-			2	-
4	(8) Martin Dugard	12			3					3	3				3				12				0
4	(18) Kelvin Tatum	3										1				1			2	1
4	Denmark	17	0	2	2	2	2	2	5	5	6	6	6	8	9	9	9	11		13	13	14	17
4	(13) Hans Nielsen	11		2					3		1							2	8				3
4	(14) Gert Handberg	0	0					F				0					0		0	-
4	(15) Brian Karger	3			0			0						2		0			2			1
4	(16) John Jørgensen	1				0	0						-		1				1		0
4	(20) Morten Andersen	2											0						0	2
Placing	Team / Rider name	Total	1	2	3	4	5	6	7	8	9	10	11	12	13	14	15	16	Pts	17	18	19	20

M - exclusion for exceeding two-minute time allowance • T - exclusion for touching the tapes • X - other exclusion • E - retired or mechanical failure • F - fell

Helmet colours were permanent for each team (Red, Blue, White and Yellow/Black). Colours in diagrams indicate gate positions:
gate A – inside	gate B	gate C	gate D – outside

== See also ==
- 1992 Individual Speedway World Championship
- 1992 Speedway World Pairs Championship
