= 1990 Speedway World Team Cup =

Motorcycle competition in Europe

Seasons
- ← 1989 1991 →

The 1990 Speedway World Team Cup was the 31st edition of the FIM Speedway World Team Cup to determine the team world champions.

The final was staged at Svítkov Stadion, Pardubice, Czechoslovakia and the United States won their second title.

== First Round ==
- 22 April 1990
- (East Germany) Güstrow Speedway Stadium, Gustrow

1st	2nd	3rd
Austria - 37; 7.Toni Pilotto (2,2,2,2,3,3) - 14; 8.Heinrich Schatzer (3,3,3,3,3,2) - 17; 14.Walter Nebel (0,2,2,2) - 6	East Germany - 35; 9.Mike Ott (2,3,3,1,2,2) - 13; 10.Ralf Peters (3,e,2,0,3) - 8; 15.Thomas Diehr (3,1,1,3,3) - 11	Netherlands - 19; 5.Rene Elzinga (0,3,0,f,3,0)- 6; 6.Ron Koppe (1,3,2,1,3,1) - 11; 13.Henk Bangma (0,0,2,f) - 2

4th	5th
Bulgaria - 18; 1.Nikolai Manev (3,2,e,3,1,0) - 9; 2.Zdravko Iordanov (2,1,1,0,1,1) - 6; 11.Rudolf Valentinov (0,1,0,2) - 3	Yugoslavia - 14; 3.Martin Peterca (0,2,1,2,1,1) - 7; 4.Gregor Pintar (1,1,2,1,0,1) - 6; 12.Krešo Omerzel (0,1,0,0) - 1

- 1 May 1990
- (Socialist Federal Republic of Yugoslavia) Ilirija Sports Park, Ljubljana

1st	2nd	3rd
Austria - 32; Toni Pilotto - 15; Heinrich Schatzer - 11; Walter Nebel - 6	East Germany - 28; Thomas Diehr - 13; Mike Ott - 12; Ralf Peters - 3	Bulgaria - 27; Zdravko Iordanov - 12; Nikolai Manev - 11; Galio Velickov - 4

4th	5th
Yugoslavia - 19; Gregor Pintar - 11; Martin Peterca - 4 Krešo Omerzel - 4	Netherlands - 14; Rene Elzinga - 6 Rob Dolman - 5 Ron Koppe - 3

Austria to second round

== Second round ==
- 20 May 1990
- (Italy) Santa Marina Stadium, Lonigo

Placing	Team / Rider name	Total	1	2	3	4	5	6	7	8	9	10	11	12	13	14	15	16	Pts	17	18	19	20
1	Norway	44	3	5	8	11	14	17	20	21	24	24	27	29	30	32	35	36		39	41	43	44
1	(1) Arnt Forland	9				3				1				2				1	7		2
1	(2) Einar Kyllingstad	13			3				3				3				3		12				1
1	(3) Tor Einar Hielm	9		2				3				0			1				6	3
1	(4) Lars Gunnestad	13	3				3				3					2			11			2
1	(17) Odd Petersen	0																	0
2	Finland	43	2	5	7	8	9	11	13	16	16	17	19	22	25	28	29	32		34	37	40	43
2	(9) Olli Tyrväinen	10			2		1					1						3	7		3
2	(10) Juha Moksunen	6				1		2			0						1		4	2
2	(11) Vesa Ylinen	14		3						3			2			3			11				3
2	(12) Kai Niemi	13	2						2					3	3				10			3
2	(19) Ari Koponen	0																	0
4	Italy	22	1	1	1	3	5	6	6	8	9	12	13	14	16	16	18	20		20	19	20	22
4	(13) Armando Castagna	3		0					0		1							2	3		-
4	(14) Armando Dal Chiele	10	1							2		3					2		8				2
4	(15) Fabrizio Vesprini	2			0			1						1		-			2	E
4	(16) Valentino Furlanetto	8				2	2						1		2				7			1
4	(20) Andrea Maida	1														0			0		1
4	Austria	8	0	1	2	2	2	2	3	3	5	7	7	7	7	8	8	8		8	8	8	8
4	(5) Franz Leitner	0	0					0					0					0	0	E
4	(6) Walter Nebel	1		1			0							-			0		1		-
4	(7) Toni Pilotto	4				0			1			2				1			4				0
4	(8) Heinrich Schatzer	3			1					0	2				0				3			0
4	(18) Siegfried Eder	0												0					0		0
Placing	Team / Rider name	Total	1	2	3	4	5	6	7	8	9	10	11	12	13	14	15	16	Pts	17	18	19	20

M - exclusion for exceeding two-minute time allowance • T - exclusion for touching the tapes • X - other exclusion • E - retired or mechanical failure • F - fell

Helmet colours were permanent for each team (Red, Blue, White and Yellow/Black). Colours in diagrams indicate gate positions:
gate A – inside	gate B	gate C	gate D – outside

- 28 May 1990
- (Finland) Kotka Motor Sports Center, Karhula

1st	2nd	3rd	4th
Finland - 45; Kai Niemi - 14; Olli Tyrväinen - 10; Vesa Ylinen - 6 Juha Moksunen - 13; Roy Malminheimo - 2	Norway - 35; Einar Kyllingstad - 13; Arnt Förland - 12; Lars Gunnestad - 7 Tor Einar Hielm - 3 Odd Petersen - 0	Italy - 24; Armando Dal Chiele - 7 Valentino Furlanetto - 8 Armando Castagna - 6 Fabrizio Vesprini - 3 Andrea Maida - 0	Austria - 16; Heinrich Schatzer - 6 Toni Pilotto - 3 Walter Nebel - 4 Franz Leitner - 3

Finland to third round.

== Third round ==
- 8 July 1990
- (Hungary) Napos út, Szeged

1st	2nd	3rd	4th
Australia - 49; Todd Wiltshire - 14; Troy Butler - 13; Leigh Adams - 11; Craig Boyce - 6 Stephen Davies - 5	Hungary - 40; Zoltán Adorján - 14; Zoltan Hajdu - 10; Sándor Tihanyi - 8 Róbert Nagy - 7 József Petrikovics - 1	Finland - 23; Vesa Yulinen - 9 Olli Tyrväinen - 7 Roy Malminheimo - 5 Juha Moksunen - 2	Poland - 9 Jan Krzystyniak - 5 Tomasz Gollob - 2 Eugeniusz Skupien - 2 Tomasz Fajfer- 0 Jacek Gomólski - 0

- 14 July 1990
- (Poland) Edward Jancarz Stadium, Gorzow

1st	2nd	3rd	4th
Australia - 55; Todd Wiltshire (3,3,3,3,3) - 15; Leigh Adams (3,3,3,3,3) - 15; Troy Butler (3,1,3,3,3) - 13; Stephen Davies (2,3,3,1,-) - 9 Craig Boyce (-,-,-,-,3) - 3	Hungary - 29; Zoltán Adorján (2,2,1,3,2) - 10; Zoltan Hajdu (1,3,-,2,2) - 8 József Petrikovics (2,2,0,-,2) - 6 Sándor Tihanyi (2,0,-,e,-) - 2 Laszlo Bodi (-,-,e\2,0,1) - 3	Finland - 24; Olli Tyrväinen (3,2,2,2,1) - 10; Vesa Yulinen (1,2,1,2,1) - 7 Juha Moksunen (0,1,0,1,2) - 5 Roy Malminheimo (f,1,2,0,0) - 3	Poland - 11; Tomasz Gollob (0,0,2,2,f) - 4 Krzysztof Okupski (1,0,1,1,0) - 3 Jan Krzystyniak (f,1,-,-,-) - 1 Ryszard Franczyszyn (f,0,-,1,0) - 1 Dariusz Śledź (-,0,1,0,1) - 2

Australia to fourth round.

== Fourth round ==
- 27 July 1990
- (West Germany) Olching Speedwaybahn, Olching

Placing	Team / Rider name	Total	1	2	3	4	5	6	7	8	9	10	11	12	13	14	15	16	Pts	17	18	19	20
1	Sweden	38	2	2	4	7	9	11	13	16	19	21	21	24	27	27	29	30		32	34	37	38
1	(9) Per Jonsson	9			2		2					2						1	7		2
1	(10) Jimmy Nilsen	13				3		2			3						2		10			3
1	(11) Dennis Löfqvist	0		0						-			-			0			0	-
1	(12) Henrik Gustafsson	11	2						2					3	3				10				1
1	(19) Conny Ivarsson	5								3			0						3	2
2	United States	37	3	5	8	10	10	11	14	16	17	20	22	22	24	25	28	30		33	34	34	37
2	(1) Sam Ermolenko	7				2				2				F				2	6		1
2	(2) Rick Miller	14			3				3				2				3		11				3
2	(3) Kelly Moran	8		2				1				3			2				8			0
2	(4) Ronnie Correy	8	3				0				1					1			5	3
2	(17) -	0																	0
4	Australia	23	0	1	1	2	3	3	4	5	7	8	9	11	11	14	15	15		16	19	21	23
4	(13) Stephen Davies	6		1					1		2							E	4			2
4	(14) Leigh Adams	4	0							1		1					1		3	1
4	(15) Troy Butler	7			F			-						2		3			5				2
4	(16) Craig Boyce	6				1	1						1		F				3		3
4	(20) Craig Hodgson	0						0											0
4	West Germany	22	1	4	5	5	8	11	11	11	11	11	14	15	16	18	18	21		21	21	22	22
4	(5) Klaus Lausch	10	1					3					3					3	10				0
4	(6) Andre Pollehn	8		3			3							1			0		7			1
4	(7) Tommy Dunker	2				0			0			0				2			2		0
4	(8) Alois Bachhuber	0			F					-	-				-				0	-
4	(18) Carsten Pelzmann	2			1					0	0				1				2	0
Placing	Team / Rider name	Total	1	2	3	4	5	6	7	8	9	10	11	12	13	14	15	16	Pts	17	18	19	20

M - exclusion for exceeding two-minute time allowance • T - exclusion for touching the tapes • X - other exclusion • E - retired or mechanical failure • F - fell

Helmet colours were permanent for each team (Red, Blue, White and Yellow/Black). Colours in diagrams indicate gate positions:
gate A – inside	gate B	gate C	gate D – outside

- 25 August 1990
- (Sweden) Grevby Motorstadion, Mariestad

Placing	Team / Rider name	Total	1	2	3	4	5	6	7	8	9	10	11	12	13	14	15	16	Pts	17	18	19	20
1	United States	44	2	5	6	9	10	13	14	17	18	21	24	25	28	29	32	35		36	38	41	44
1	(5) Sam Ermolenko	14	2					3					3					3	11				3
1	(6) Rick Miller	7		3			1							1			-		5		2
1	(7) Kelly Moran	6				3			1			-				1			5	1
1	(8) Ronnie Correy	2			1					-	1				-				2			-
1	(18) Shawn Moran	15								3		3			3		3		12			3
2	Sweden	40	1	2	4	6	9	11	14	15	18	20	21	24	26	28	30	31		34	37	39	40
2	(13) Per Jonsson	10		1					3		3							1	8			2
2	(14) Jimmy Nilsen	9	1							1		2					2		6	3
2	(15) Henrik Gustafsson	10			2			2						3		2			9				1
2	(16) Peter Nahlin	11				2	3						1		2				8		3
2	(20) -	0																	0
4	Australia	36	3	5	8	9	11	12	14	16	18	19	21	23	24	27	28	30		32	33	34	36
4	(1) Todd Wiltshire	7				1				2				2				2	7		-
4	(2) Troy Butler	9			3				2				2				1		8			1
4	(3) Leigh Adams	6		2				1				1			-				4	2
4	(4) Craig Boyce	12	3				2				2					3			10				2
4	(17) Stephen Davies	2													1				1		1
4	West Germany	0	0	0	0	0	0	0	0	0	0	0	0	0	0	0	0	0		0	0	0	0
4	(9) Klaus Lausch	0			0		0					0						0	0				0
4	(10) Hans-Otto Pingel	0				0		0			0						0		0	0
4	(11) Andre Pollehn	0		0						0			0			0			0		0
4	(12) Tommy Dunker	0	0						0					0	0				0			0
4	(19) -	0																	0
Placing	Team / Rider name	Total	1	2	3	4	5	6	7	8	9	10	11	12	13	14	15	16	Pts	17	18	19	20

M - exclusion for exceeding two-minute time allowance • T - exclusion for touching the tapes • X - other exclusion • E - retired or mechanical failure • F - fell

Helmet colours were permanent for each team (Red, Blue, White and Yellow/Black). Colours in diagrams indicate gate positions:
gate A – inside	gate B	gate C	gate D – outside

USA to World final.

== World final ==
- 16 September 1990
- (Czechoslovakia) Svítkov Stadion, Pardubice

Placing	Team / Rider name	Total	1	2	3	4	5	6	7	8	9	10	11	12	13	14	15	16	Pts	17	18	19	20
1	United States	37	0	2	2	5	8	8	8	10	13	16	18	21	24	27	29	30		30	32	35	37
1	(1) Sam Ermolenko	11				3				2				3				1	9				2
1	(2) Rick Miller	0			0				0				-				-		0	-
1	(3) Shawn Moran	10		2				0				3			3				8		2
1	(4) Kelly Moran	12	0				3				3					3			9			3
1	(17) Billy Hamill	4											2				2		4	0
2	England	34	2	5	6	7	8	11	14	17	18	18	19	20	22	24	24	27		29	32	33	34
2	(13) Kelvin Tatum	11		3					3		1							3	10				1
2	(14) Simon Wigg	8	2							3		0					0		5		3
2	(15) Jeremy Doncaster	8			1			3						1		2			7			1
2	(16) Marvyn Cox	2				1	-						1		-				2	-
2	(20) Gary Havelock	5					1								2				3	2
3	Denmark	30	3	4	7	9	11	13	14	15	15	17	20	20	20	21	22	24		25	25	27	30
3	(5) Hans Nielsen	13	3					2					3					2	10				3
3	(6) John Jørgensen	4		1			2							0			1		4			-
3	(7) Bo Petersen	4				2			1			-				-			3	1
3	(8) Tommy Knudsen	4			3					1	0				0				4		0
3	(18) Brian Karger	5										2				1			3			2
4	Czechoslovakia	19	1	1	3	3	3	4	6	6	8	9	9	11	12	12	15	15		18	19	19	19
4	(9) Roman Matoušek	3			2		0					1						0	3		-
4	(10) Zdeněk Tesař	6				0		1			2						3		6				0
4	(11) Antonín Kasper Jr.	3		0						0			-			0			0	3
4	(12) Bohumil Brhel	6	1						2					2	1				6			0
4	(19) Vladimir Kalina	1											0						0		1
Placing	Team / Rider name	Total	1	2	3	4	5	6	7	8	9	10	11	12	13	14	15	16	Pts	17	18	19	20

M - exclusion for exceeding two-minute time allowance • T - exclusion for touching the tapes • X - other exclusion • E - retired or mechanical failure • F - fell

Helmet colours were permanent for each team (Red, Blue, White and Yellow/Black). Colours in diagrams indicate gate positions:
gate A – inside	gate B	gate C	gate D – outside

== See also ==
- 1990 Individual Speedway World Championship
- 1990 Speedway World Pairs Championship
