= 1996 Speedway Grand Prix Qualification =

The 1996 Speedway Grand Prix Qualification or GP Challenge was a series of motorcycle speedway meetings used to determine the 8 riders that qualified for the 1996 Speedway Grand Prix to join the other 8 riders that finished in the leading positions from the 1995 Speedway Grand Prix and Jason Crump who was seeded through to the Grand Prix.

Leigh Adams won the GP Challenge.

== Format ==
- First Round - 4 riders each from Sweden, Denmark, Finland and Norway to Scandinavian Final
- First Round - 32 riders from Continental quarter finals to Continental semi-finals
- First Round - 6 riders from British final to Overseas Final
- First Round - 5 riders from Australian final to Overseas Final
- First Round - 4 riders from United States final to Overseas Final
- First Round - 1 rider from New Zealand final to Overseas Final
- Second Round - 8 riders from Scandinavian final to Intercontinental Final
- Second Round - 8 riders from Overseas final to Intercontinental Final
- Second Round - 16 riders from Continental semi-finals to Continental Final
- Third Round - 8 riders from positions 9-16 from the 1995 Grand Prix to GP Challenge
- Third Round - 4 riders from the Continental Final to GP Challenge
- Third Round - 3 riders from the Intercontinental Final to GP Challenge
- Final Round - 8 riders from the GP Challenge to the 1996 Grand Prix

== First round ==
=== Continental quarter finals ===
QF (7 May (Slovenia) Ljubljana)
Pos	Rider	Points
1	(Russia) Rif Saitgareev	13
2	(Poland) Roman Jankowski	13
3	(Poland) Rafał Dobrucki	11
4	(Hungary) Laszlo Bodi	11
5	(Ukraine) Vladimir Kolodij	11
6	(Hungary) Sándor Tihanyi	11
7	(Czech Republic) Petr Vandírek	8
8	(Bulgaria) Nikolaj Manev	7
9	(Slovenia) Martin Peterca	7
10	(Hungary) Csaba Hell	7
11	(Italy) Massimo Mora	6
12	(Poland) Mirosław Cierniak	5
13	(Slovenia) Gerhard Leske	5
14	(Austria) Ivan Nagar	2
15	(Austria) Heinrich Schatzer	1
16	(Croatia) Zlato Krznaric	1
17	(Poland) Marek Kepa	0

QF (7 May (Germany) Pfaffenhofen)
Pos	Rider	Points
1	(Czech Republic) Antonín Kasper Jr.	12
2	(Austria) Andreas Bössner	12
3	(Czech Republic) Antonín Šváb Jr.	11
4	(Hungary) Róbert Nagy	10
5	(Hungary) Zsolt Böszermenyi	9
6	(Czech Republic) Tomáš Topinka	9
7	(Russia) Oleg Kurguskin	9
8	(Hungary) Antal Kocso	9
9	(Austria) Franz Leitner	8
10	(Germany) Andreas Schapf	7
11	(Czech Republic) Václav Milík Sr.	7
12	(Russia) Sergej Eroschin	7
13	(Hungary) Zsolt Bencze	4
14	(Italy) Valentino Furlanetto	4
15	(Slovakia) Gaspar Forgac	1
16	(Austria) Walter Nebel	

QF (7 May (Poland) Toruń)
Pos	Rider	Points
1	(Hungary) Zoltán Adorján	14
2	(Poland) Jaroslaw Olszewski	12
3	(Czech Republic) Roman Matoušek	11
4	(Czech Republic) George Štancl	11
5	(Poland) Tomasz Bajerski	11
6	(Poland) Jacek Gollob	11
7	(Russia) Rinat Mardanshin	9
8	(Russia) Grigorij Charchenko	8
9	(Russia) Igor Marko	7
10	(Hungary) Zoltan Hajdu	7
11	(Poland) Daruisz Stenka	7
12	(Latvia) Vladimir Voronkov	5
13	(Netherlands) Patrick Verbrugge	4
14	(Ukraine) Igor Borysenko	2
15	(Germany) Thomas Koch	1
16	(Germany) Stefan Leonhard	0
17	(Latvia) Alexander Biznia	0
18	(Poland) Dariusz Fliegert	0

QF (7 May (France) Marmande)
Pos	Rider	Points
1	(Italy) Armando Castagna	13
2	(Italy) Andrea Maida	13
3	(Czech Republic) Marián Jirout	12
4	(Czech Republic) Zdeněk Schneiderwind	12
5	(Poland) Dariusz Śledź	10
6	(Italy) Stefano Alfonso	10
7	(Czech Republic) Bohumil Brhel	9
8	(Poland) Piotr Winiarz	9
9	(Czech Republic) Jan Holub II	9
10	(France) Christophe Dubernard	6
11	(Poland) Rafał Wilk	6
12	(Germany) Hartmut Balfanz	5
13	(Italy) Stefano Spagnolo	3
14	(France) Frederick Brisseau	2
15	(France) Stéphane Trésarrieu	1
16	(Netherlands) Maik Groen	0

== Second round ==
=== Overseas Final ===
8 riders to Intercontinental Final

=== Scandinavian Final ===
8 riders to Intercontinental Final

(11 Jun 1995 (Denmark) Brovst)
Pos	Rider	Points
1	(Sweden) Stefan Andersson	14
2	(Sweden) Peter Karlsson	13
3	(Denmark) John Jørgensen	13
4	(Denmark) Brian Karger	12
5	(Norway) Lars Gunnestad	11
6	(Denmark) Brian Andersen	10
7	(Norway) Rune Holta	10
8	(Denmark) Gert Handberg	8
9	(Finland) Kai Laukkanen	7
10	(Sweden) Conny Ivarsson	5
11	(Norway) Arnt Førland	5
12	(Finland) Marko Hyyryläinen	4
13	(Norway) Ingvar Hvamstad	1
14	(Sweden) Dennis Löfqvist	1
15	(Finland) Vesa Ylinen	0
16	(Finland) Tomi Kalliomäki	0

=== Continental semi finals ===
Continental semi-finals - 16 riders from to Continental Final

SF

- 11 June 1995 (Czech Republic) Mšeno

Pos.	Rider	Points
1	(Russia) Rif Saitgareev	14
2	(Czech Republic) Antonín Kasper Jr.	14
3	(Czech Republic) Tomáš Topinka	12
4	(Poland) Rafał Dobrucki	9
5	(Czech Republic) Antonín Šváb Jr.	9
6	(Hungary) Róbert Nagy	9
7	(Ukraine) Vladimir Kolodij	8
8	(Austria) Andreas Bössner	7
9	(Hungary) Laszlo Bodi	7
10	(Hungary) Sándor Tihanyi	6
11	(Poland) Roman Jankowski	6
12	(Austria) Franz Leitner	5
13	(Slovenia) Martin Peterca	5
14	(Hungary) Antal Kocso	4
15	(Hungary) Csaba Hell	3
16	(Bulgaria) Nikolaj Manev	2
17	(Hungary) Zsolt Böszermenyi	0

SF

- 10 June 1995 (Italy) Lonigo

Pos.	Rider	Points
1	(Hungary) Zoltán Adorján	15
2	(Italy) Stefano Alfonso	12
3	(Italy) Armando Castagna	11
4	(Russia) Rinat Mardanshin	11
5	(Czech Republic) Bohumil Brhel	9
6	(Italy) Andrea Maida	9
7	(Poland) Dariusz Śledź	8
8	(Poland) Jaroslaw Olszewski	9
9	(Czech Republic) Roman Matoušek	7
10	(Czech Republic) Marián Jirout	7
11	(Poland) Tomasz Bajerski	5
12	(Poland) Jacek Gollob	5
13	(Czech Republic) Zdeněk Schneiderwind	4
14	(Czech Republic) George Štancl	2
15	(Czech Republic) Jan Holub II	0
16	(Italy) Stefano Spagnolo	0

== Third round ==
- Peter Karlsson seeded to GP Challenge
- 8 riders from positions 9-16 from the 1995 Speedway Grand Prix to GP Challenge final

=== Intercontinental Final ===
3 riders to GP Challenge final

=== Continental Final ===
- 4 riders to GP Challenge
- 30 July 1995 (Hungary) Borsod Volán Stadion, Miskolc

Pos.	Rider	Points
1	(Hungary) Zoltán Adorján	12+3
2	(Italy) Stefano Alfonso	12+2
3	(Czech Republic) Antonín Kasper Jr.	11
4	(Hungary) Róbert Nagy	10
5	(Russia) Rif Saitgareev	10
6	(Ukraine) Vladimir Kolodij	10
7	(Czech Republic) Tomáš Topinka	10
8	(Italy) Armando Castagna	10
9	(Russia) Rinat Mardanshin	6
10	(Poland) Rafał Dobrucki	6
11	(Poland) Jaroslaw Olszewski	6
12	(Czech Republic) Antonín Šváb Jr.	5
13	(Italy) Andrea Maida	3
14	(Austria) Andreas Bössner	3
15	(Hungary) Laszlo Bodi	3
16	(Czech Republic) Bohumil Brhel	2
17	(Poland) Dariusz Śledź	0
18	(Czech Republic) Roman Matoušek	0

== Final Round ==
=== GP Challenge Final ===
8 riders to 1996 Grand Prix

- 8 October 1995 (Italy) Lonigo

Pos.	Rider	Points
1	(Australia) Leigh Adams	14
2	(England) Marvyn Cox	13
3	(Sweden) Peter Karlsson	11
4	(Denmark) Tommy Knudsen	11
5	(England) Joe Screen	11
6	(England) Gary Havelock	9
7	(Australia) Craig Boyce	8
8	(England) Andy Smith	8
9	(Poland) Tomasz Gollob	8
10	(Hungary) Róbert Nagy	6
11	(Denmark) Jan Stæchmann	5
12	(Hungary) Zoltán Adorján	5
13	(Sweden) Mikael Karlsson	4
14	(Denmark) Brian Karger	3
15	(Italy) Stefano Alfonso	2
16	(Czech Republic) Antonín Kasper Jr.	1
