= 1989 Speedway World Team Cup =

30th edition of the annual motorcycle speedway World Cup competition

Seasons
- ← 1988 1990 →

The 1989 Speedway World Team Cup was the 30th edition of the FIM Speedway World Team Cup to determine the team world champions.

The final was staged at Odsal Stadium, Bradford, England. The English team dominated the meeting, following near tragedy for Denmark. Jeremy Doncaster, Kelvin Tatum, Paul Thorp and Simon Wigg defeated Denmark, Sweden and the USA in a single meeting final. The Danish run of sixth consecutive titles finally came to an end and England once more went top of the all-time list, with nine titles.

The World Cup Final saw the end of the career of three time World Champion Erik Gundersen of Denmark. In the first race of the meeting, Gundersen won the start from gate 4 and headed the field into the first turn. As he pulled across the others and down t the white line (as he had done hundreds of times previously in his career) Lance King and Jimmy Nilsen were locked in their own private battle just behind him and didn't appreciate how close to Gundersen they were. As the American and Swede locked together they clipped Gundersen's rear wheel and he was thrown over the highside. As he lay on the race track he was hit in the head by Cradley teammate Simon Cross's rear wheel as Cross attempted to negotiate his way through the carnage. All 4 riders were rushed to Hospital but Gundersen had suffered life threatening injuries, indeed having been knocked unconscious and sustaining serious injuries Gundersen had swallowed his tongue and his life was saved on the track by the quick intervention of a St Johns Ambulance lady and the track doctor (attending his first ever speedway meeting) as fans and fellow riders watched on. After the accident he was not expected to live and he remained in coma for a period of time but he eventually regained consciousness. Gundersen had to learn to walk again and raised a large amount of money for the Bradford Royal Infirmary which saved his life and he later became manager of the Danish Speedway Team. None of the riders involved in the accident - Gundersen, Simon Cross, Jimmy Nilsen and Lance King, took any further part in the final and Denmark were clearly affected by the accident.

== First round ==
- 30 April (Bulgaria) Shumen Motopista, Shumen
- 17 May (Norway) Elgane Speedway, Varhaug

1st	2nd	3rd	4th
Norway 45+47=92; Ingvar Skogland 24; Lars Gunnestad 23; Arne Svendsen 18; Tor Einar Hielm 15; Einar Kyllingstad 12	Bulgaria 37+37=74; Nikolaj Manev 25; Georgi Petranov 19; Zacharia Jordanov 17; Vesselin Markov 7 Orlin Janakiev 6	Netherlands 22+16=38; Ron Koppe 13; Henk Bangma 9 Rene Elzinga 8 Bob Dolman 4 Ron van Dam 4	New Zealand; Qualified - not started

Norway to second round

== Second round ==
- 11 June (Italy) Santa Marina Stadium, Lonigo
- 29 June (Austria) Stadion Wiener Neustadt, Wiener Neustadt

1st	2nd	3rd	4th
Italy 47+30=77; Armando Dal Chiele 22; Valentino Furlanetto 21; Giorgio Zaramella 13; Armando Castagna 10; Andrea Maida 9 Fabrizio Vesprini 2	Norway 31+40=71; Lars Gunnestad 25; Einar Kyllingstad 22; Arnt Förland 10; Arne Svendsen 8 Ingvar Skogland 4 Per Erga 2	Finland 18+29=47; Olli Tyrväinen 20; Janne Moksunen 9 Kai Niemi 7 Aki Ala-Riihimäki 6 Roy Malminheimo 4 Ari Koponen 1	Austria 24+21=45; Walter Nebel 12; Heinrich Schatzer 11; Andreas Bössner 10; Robert Funk 6 Thomas Stadler 6 Toni Pilotto 0

Italy to third round.

== Third round ==
- 2 July (Hungary) Nyíregyháza Speedway, Nyíregyháza
- 15 July (Poland) Stal Rzeszów Municipal Stadium, Rzeszów

1st	2nd	3rd	4th
Australia 48+49=97; Troy Butler 26; Stephen Davies 24; Mick Poole 21; Craig Boyce 20; Leigh Adams 6	Hungary 44+17=61; Zoltán Adorján 19; Antal Kocso 15; Sándor Tihanyi 13; József Petrikovics 12; Zoltan Hajdu 2	Poland 9+38=47; Ryszard Franczyszyn 14; Roman Jankowski 13; Piotr Świst 9 Janusz Stachyra 8 Sławomir Drabik 2 Ryszard Dołomisiewicz 1	Italy 19+15=34; Armando Castagna 12; Valentino Furlanetto 10; Armando Dal Chiele 6 Giorgio Zaramella 4 Andrea Maida 1 Mariano Castagna 1

Australia to fourth round.

== Fourth round ==
- 30 July (West Germany) Rhein-Main Arena, Diedenbergen
- 28 August (Czechoslovakia) Markéta Stadium, Prague

1st	2nd	3rd	4th
Sweden 38+40=78; Per Jonsson 23; Jimmy Nilsen 21; Erik Stenlund 18; Tony Olsson 13; Mikael Blixt 3	West Germany 39+24=63; Gerd Riss 19; Klaus Lausch 18; Karl Maier 16; Klaus Freundorfer 4 Alois Bachhuber 4 Tommy Dunker 2	Czechoslovakia 27+34=61; Bohumil Brhel 17; Antonín Kasper Jr. 16; Roman Matoušek 12; Zdeněk Tesař 9 Zdeněk Schneiderwind 7 Jan Holub II 0	Australia 16+22=38; Craig Boyce 12; Stephen Davies 10; Mick Poole 8 Troy Butler 6 Leigh Adams 2 Craig Hodgson 0 Todd Wiltshire 0

Sweden to World final.

== World final ==
- 17 September
- (England) Odsal Stadium, Bradford

1st	2nd	3rd	4th
England 48; Jeremy Doncaster 13; Kelvin Tatum 12; Paul Thorp 12; Simon Wigg 11; Simon Cross 0	Denmark 34; Hans Nielsen 11; Gert Handberg 9 John Jørgensen 7 Brian Karger 7 Erik Gundersen 0	Sweden 30; Mikael Blixt 10; Per Jonsson 8 Tony Olsson 7 Erik Stenlund 5 Jimmy Nilsen 0	(United States) USA 8 Kelly Moran 6 Greg Hancock 2 Ronnie Correy 0 Rick Miller 0 Lance King 0

== See also ==
- 1989 Individual Speedway World Championship
- 1989 Speedway World Pairs Championship
