= 1992 Speedway World Pairs Championship =

23rd edition of the World motorcycle speedway Pairs Championship

1992 World Pairs Championship

Seasons
- ← 1991 1993 →

The 1992 Speedway World Pairs Championship was the twenty-third FIM Speedway World Pairs Championship. The final took place in Lonigo, Italy. The championship was won by United States who beat England in Run-Off (both 23 points) and Sweden (22 points).

== Semi final 1 ==
- (Czechoslovakia) Svítkov Stadium, Pardubice
- 7 June

Pos.	Team	Rider	Points
1	United States (26 pts)	Ronnie Correy	16
1	United States (26 pts)	Sam Ermolenko	10
2	Sweden (22 pts)	Per Jonsson	15
2	Sweden (22 pts)	Tony Rickardsson	4
2	Sweden (22 pts)	Jimmy Nilsen	3
3	Australia (19 pts)	Leigh Adams	13
3	Australia (19 pts)	Shane Parker	4
3	Australia (19 pts)	Craig Boyce	2
4	Czechoslovakia (18 pts)	Bohumil Brhel	12
4	Czechoslovakia (18 pts)	Roman Matoušek	4
4	Czechoslovakia (18 pts)	Antonín Kasper Jr.	2
5	Hungary (14 pts)	Zoltán Adorján	10
5	Hungary (14 pts)	Sándor Tihanyi	2
5	Hungary (14 pts)	Antal Kocso	2
6	Poland (14 pts)	Tomasz Gollob	9
6	Poland (14 pts)	Piotr Swist	4
6	Poland (14 pts)	Slawomir Drabik	1
7	Finland (13 pts)	Vesa Ylinen	9
7	Finland (13 pts)	Juha Moksunen	4

== Semi final 2 ==
- (Germany) Motodrom Halbemond, Nodern
- 7 June

Pos.	Team	Rider	Points
1	England (28 pts)	Gary Havelock	18
1	England (28 pts)	Paul Thorp	10
2	Denmark (26 pts)	Tommy Knudsen	14
2	Denmark (26 pts)	Hans Nielsen	12
3	New Zealand (21 pts)	Mitch Shirra	11
3	New Zealand (21 pts)	Mark Thorpe	10
4	Norway (18 pts)	Lars Gunnestad	11
4	Norway (18 pts)	Einar Kyllingstad	7
5	Germany (14 pts)	Gerd Riss	11
5	Germany (14 pts)	Tommy Dunker	3
5	Germany (14 pts)	Andre Pollehn	0
6	(Commonwealth of Independent States) CIS (11 pts)	Rene Aas	6
6	(Commonwealth of Independent States) CIS (11 pts)	Rinat Mardanshin	5
7	Austria (8 pts)	Andreas Bössner	6
7	Austria (8 pts)	Heinrich Schatzer	2

== World final ==
- (Italy) Santa Marina Stadium, Lonigo

Pos.	Team	Rider	Points
1st	United States (23+3 pts)	Greg Hancock	11+3
1st	United States (23+3 pts)	Sam Ermolenko	9
1st	United States (23+3 pts)	Ronnie Correy	3
2nd	England (23+2 pts)	Gary Havelock	15+2
2nd	England (23+2 pts)	Kelvin Tatum	8
2nd	England (23+2 pts)	Martin Dugard	—
3rd	Sweden (22 pts)	Per Jonsson	14
3rd	Sweden (22 pts)	Henrik Gustafsson	8
3rd	Sweden (22 pts)	Tony Rickardsson	—
4	Italy (18 pts)	Armando Castagna	16
4	Italy (18 pts)	Valentino Furlanetto	2
4	Italy (18 pts)	Armando Dal Chiele	0
5	Denmark (16 pts)	Hans Nielsen	13
5	Denmark (16 pts)	Brian Karger	2
5	Denmark (16 pts)	Tommy Knudsen	1
6	New Zealand (14 pts)	Mitch Shirra	12
6	New Zealand (14 pts)	David Bargh	2
6	New Zealand (14 pts)	Mark Thorpe	0
7	Australia (10 pts)	Craig Boyce	5
7	Australia (10 pts)	Leigh Adams	4
7	Australia (10 pts)	Shane Parker	1

== See also ==
- 1992 Individual Speedway World Championship
- 1992 Speedway World Team Cup
- motorcycle speedway
- 1992 in sports
