= 1999 Speedway World Team Cup =

40th edition of the annual motorcycle speedway World Cup competition

Seasons
- ← 1998 2000 →

The 1999 Speedway World Team Cup was the 40th edition of the FIM Speedway World Team Cup to determine the team world champions.

The final took place at the Svítkov Stadium in Pardubice in the Czech Republic. The winners were the Australia team who claimed their second title and first since winning the 1976 Speedway World Team Cup.

== Preliminary round ==
- 15 May (Netherlands) Veenord Speedway, Veenoord

First	Second	Third	Fourth
Netherlands 42; Theo Pijper 13; Maik Groen 13; Jim Groen 8 Erik Eijbergen 7 Emiel Groen 1	Austria 38; Toni Pilotto 15; Heinrich Schatzer 11; Helmut Lercher 7 Siegfried Eder 5 Thomas Stadler 0	Croatia 36; Zlatko Krznaric 19; Zeljko Feher 9 Renato Kuster 5 Tomislav Radic 3	Ukraine 14; Vladimir Trofimov 13; Aleksander Liatosinsky 12; Vladimir Kolodij 2

Holland, Austria and Croatia to Quarter-Final

== Quarter-final ==
- 22 May (Italy) Santa Marina Stadium, Lonigo

First	Second	Third	Fourth
Australia 55; Jason Crump 17; Leigh Adams 15; Jason Lyons 12; Todd Wiltshire 11	Italy 47; Armando Castagna 14; Andrea Maida 13; Stefano Alfonso 11; Graziano Franchetti 5 Simone Terenzani 4	Slovenia 30; Matej Ferjan 12; Tomas Sustersic 7 Gerhard Lekse 5 Izak Šantej 4	Austria 11; Helmut Lercher 4 Sigfried Eder 4 Thomas Stadler 2 Heinrich Schatzer 1

Australia to Semi-Final

- 24 May (Germany) Altes Stadion, Abensberg

First	Second	Third	Fourth
Germany 56; Gerd Riss 16; Matthias Kröger 14; Joachim Kugelmann 14; Robert Barth 12	Norway 39; Bent E. Larsen 12; Kenneth Borgenhaug 11; Björn Hansen 9 Kjell O. Sola 7	Croatia 29; Zlatko Krznaric 17; Renato Kuster 8 Zejliko Feher 4 Tomislav Radic 0	Netherlands 20; Theo Pijper 10; Maik Groen 8 Jim Groen 1 Henk Bos 1

Germany to Semi-Final

== Semi-final ==
- 15 August (England) Wimborne Road, Poole

First	Second	Third	Fourth
England 53; 1.Chris Louis (3,3,2,2,2,3) - 15; 2.Scott Nicholls (e,0,-,-,3,2) - 5; 3.Joe Screen (2,1,3,3,2,3) - 14; 4.Mark Loram (3,2,2,2,3,-) - 12; 5.Carl Stonehewer (-,-,3,3,-,1) - 7	Denmark 45; 11.Hans Nielsen (3,3,3,1,3,1) - 14; 12.John Jørgensen (2,0,1,3,2,0) - 8; 13.Jesper B. Jensen (3,2,3,0,3,3) - 14; 14.Brian Karger (1,1,2,1,2,2) - 9; 15.Charlie Gjedde - NS	Germany 30; 6.Gerd Riss (2,3,1,2,f/x,-) - 8; 7.Matthias Kröger (0,2,0,0,1,e) - 3; 8.Robert Barth (2,3,2,1,1,3/2) - 14; 9.Robbie Kessler (1,1,0,-,-,-) - 2; 10.Joachim Kugelmann (-,-,-,3,f,0) - 3	Hungary 16; 16.Sándor Tihanyi (1,2,1,0,0,1) - 5; 17.Zoltán Adorján (0,0,0,1,1,2) - 4; 18.Róbert Nagy (1,0,0,0,0,1) - 2; 19.Attila Stefáni (0,1,1,2,1,0) - 5; 20.

England to World Final

- 22 August (Poland) Alfred Smoczyk Stadium, Leszno

First	Second	Third	Fourth
Australia 51; 1.Jason Crump (3,3,2,3,3,3) - 17; 2.Jason Lyons (2,2,3,2,2,2) - 13; 3.Leigh Adams (3,2,3,2,0,2) - 12; 4.Ryan Sullivan (1,1,2,3,1,1) - 9; 5.Todd Wiltshire - ns	Poland 43; 16.Roman Jankowski (2,2,-,-,1,-) - 5; 17.Sławomir Drabik (0,3,3,0,-,-) - 6; 18.Rafał Dobrucki (1,3,1,1,-,-) - 6; 19.Piotr Protasiewicz (2,2,0,-,1,3/2)-11; 20.Tomasz Gollob (-,-,2,1/3,3,3,e/3) - 15	Sweden 26; 11.Jimmy Nilsen - ns 12.Mikael Karlsson (e,0,3,3,2,1) - 9; 13.Stefan Dannö (2,1,1,1,2,1) - 8; 14.Peter Svensson (-,0,0,0,0,0) - 0; 15.Henrik Gustafsson (3/3,3,e,e,-,-) - 9	Russia 24; 6.Roman Povazhny (1,0,0,1,1,1) - 4; 7.Sergey Darkin (0,1,1,2,-/1,2) - 7; 8.Sergey Eroshin (1,0,-,-,0/-,-) - 11; 9.Mikhail Starostin (0,-,1,0,-,0) - 11; 10.Oleg Kurguskin (-,1,2,2,3,3) - 11

Australia to World Final

== World final ==
- 2 October (Czech Republic) Svítkov Stadium, Pardubice

First	Second	Third	Fourth
Australia 40; 16.Jason Crump (3,1,3,3,0,3) - 13; 17.Jason Lyons (0,2,2,2,2,2) - 10; 18.Leigh Adams (1,3,1,3,3,3) - 14; 19.Ryan Sullivan (3,2,3,2,2,-) - 12; 20.Todd Wiltshire (-,-,-,-,-,2) - 2	Czech Republic 35; 11.Bohumil Brhel (-,3,1,0,2,3) - 9; 12.Aleš Dryml Jr. (0,2,3,1,3,1) - 10; 13.Antonín Šváb Jr. (f,-,-,-,-,e) - 0; 14.Michal Makovský (2,1,1,2,1,1) - 8; 15.Antonín Kasper Jr. (2,3,0,3,0,-) - 8	United States 29+3; 1.Sam Ermolenko (3,2,2,2,3/3,0) 16+3; 2.Ronnie Correy (0,0,-,-,-,-) - 0; 3.Greg Hancock (2,1,1,1/1,-,0) - 6; 4.Billy Hamill (1,f,2,1/e,1,1) - 6; 5.Josh Larsen (-,-,-,0,-,-) - 0	England 29+2; 6.Chris Louis (3,1,3,3,1,1) - 12; 7.Carl Stonehewer (1,-,e,-,0,0) - 1; 8.Joe Screen (1,0,0,0,-,3) 4+2; 9.Mark Loram (2,3,2/0,1,2,2) - 12; 10.Andy Smith (-,0,-,-,0,-) - 0

Australia win Championship. United States third after Sam Ermolenko beat Joe Screen in a race off.

== See also ==
- 1999 Speedway Grand Prix
