= 1999 Speedway Grand Prix Qualification =

The 1999 Speedway Grand Prix Qualification or GP Challenge was a series of motorcycle speedway meetings used to determine the 14 riders that qualified for the 1999 Speedway Grand Prix to join the other 8 riders that finished in the leading positions from the 1998 Speedway Grand Prix.

The format was similar to the previous year, in that 4 riders would qualify straight from the Intercontinental and Continental finals and 8 riders would qualify through the GP Challenge. The remaining two places would go to Billy Hamill and Robert Dados (world U21 champion) who were seeded through.

Leigh Adams won the GP Challenge.

== Format ==
- First Round – 6 riders each from Sweden & Denmark, 2 riders each from Finland & Norway to Scandinavian Final
- First Round – 32 riders from Continental quarter finals to Continental semi-finals
- First Round – 8 riders from British Final to Overseas Final
- First Round – 3 riders from Australian Final to Overseas Final
- First Round – 1 rider from New Zealand Final to Overseas Final
- First Round – 1 rider from South African Final to Overseas Final
- First Round – 3 riders from United States Final to Overseas Final
- Second Round – 8 riders from Scandinavian Final to Intercontinental Final
- Second Round – 8 riders from Overseas Final to Intercontinental Final
- Second Round – 16 riders from Continental semi-finals to Continental Final
- Third Round – 12 riders from positions 9-20 from the 1998 Grand Prix to GP Challenge
- Third Round – 2 riders from the Continental Final to 1999 Grand Prix and 5 to GP Challenge
- Third Round – 2 riders from the Intercontinental Final to 1999 Grand Prix and 6 to GP Challenge
- Final Round – 8 riders from the GP Challenge to the 1999 Grand Prix

== First round ==
=== Continental quarter finals ===
QF (1 May (Austria) Mureck)
Pos	Rider	Points
1	(Poland) Rafał Dobrucki	14
2	(Austria) Andreas Bössner	13+
3	(Italy) Andrea Maida	13+
4	(Poland) Jacek Rempala	10
5	(Germany) Joachim Kugelmann	10
6	(Hungary) Laszlo Bodi	9
7	(Ukraine) Alexander Liatosinski	9
8	(Italy) Alessandro Dalla Valle	9
9	(Austria) Thomas Stadler	8
10	(Austria) Siegfried Eder	7
11	(Hungary) Zsolt Bencze	5
12	(Slovenia) Tomasz Sustersic	3
13	(Croatia) Zeljko Feher	3
14	(Austria) Ivan Nagar	3
15	(Slovakia) Vladimir Visvader	2
16	(Ukraine) Igor Marko	1

QF (3 May (Germany) Moorwinkelsdamm)
Pos	Rider	Points
1	(England) Marvyn Cox	13
2	(Czech Republic) Tomáš Topinka	13
3	(Germany) Robert Barth	12
4	(Poland) Tomasz Bajerski	11
5	(Russia) Roman Povazhny	11
6	(Poland) Piotr Świst	10
7	(France) Philippe Bergé	8
8	(Germany) Matthias Kröger	8
9	(Czech Republic) Marián Jirout	8
10	(Italy) Stefano Alfonso	8
11	(Russia) Oleg Kurguskin	5
12	(Germany) Björn Danielczik	4
13	(Germany) Björn Dräger	3
14	(Netherlands) Roy Verbrugge	2
15	(Germany) Mirko Wolter	2
16	(Russia) Sergej Eroschin	1
17	(Netherlands) Patrick Verbrugge	1
18	(France) Jean Michael Bouillaud	0

QF (9 May (Slovenia) Krško)
Pos	Rider	Points
1	(Australia) Todd Wiltshire	14
2	(Slovenia) Matej Ferjan	14
3	(Hungary) Sándor Tihanyi	13
4	(Czech Republic) George Štancl	11
5	(Czech Republic) Bohumil Brhel	10
6	(Slovenia) Izak Šantej	10
7	(Hungary) Norbert Magosi	9
8	(Czech Republic) Karel Průša Jr.	8
9	(Slovenia) Gerhard Lekse	8
10	(Croatia) Renato Kuster	7
11	(Croatia) Krunoslav Zganec	5
12	(Austria) Toni Pilotto	4
13	(Italy) Francesco Ulian	3
14	(Italy) Graziano Franchetti	2
15	(France) Sebastien Trésarrieu	1
16	(France) Stéphane Trésarrieu	1

QF (10 May (Poland) Gniezno)
Pos	Rider	Points
1	(Poland) Roman Jankowski	14
2	(Czech Republic) Antonín Kasper Jr.	14
3	(Poland) Adam Fajfer	13
4	(Hungary) Róbert Nagy	11
5	(Poland) Sławomir Drabik	10
6	(Russia) Rinat Mardanshin	9
7	(Russia) Michail Starostin	9
8	(Latvia) Vladimir Voronkov	8
9	(Latvia) Nikolaj Kokins	7
10	(Hungary) László Szatmári	6
11	(Ukraine) Vladimir Trofimov	4
12	(Russia) Sergej Darkin	3
13	(Netherlands) Rob Steman	3
14	(Latvia) Alexander Biznia	3
15	(Ukraine) Vladimir Kolodij	3
16	(Poland) Andrzej Huszcza	2
17	(Czech Republic) Adrian Rymel	1
18	(Poland) Grzegorz Rempala	0

== Second round ==
=== Overseas Final ===
8 riders to Intercontinental Final

=== Scandinavian Final ===
8 riders to Intercontinental final

(4 July 1998 (Sweden) Norrköping)
Pos	Rider	Points
1	(Denmark) John Jørgensen	13
2	(Sweden) Peter Karlsson	13
3	(Sweden) Mikael Karlsson	12
4	(Denmark) Brian Karger	11
5	(Denmark) Nicki Pedersen	10
6	(Denmark) Ronni Pedersen	10
7	(Norway) Lars Gunnestad	9
8	(Sweden) Peter Nahlin	9
9	(Sweden) Andreas Jonsson	9
10	(Sweden) Niklas Klingberg	6
11	(Finland) Kai Laukkanen	5
12	(Norway) Arnt Førland	4
13	(Sweden) Niklas Karlsson	4
14	(Denmark) Hans Clausen	2
15	(Denmark) Bjarne Pedersen	2
16	(Finland) Kauko Nieminen	1

=== Continental semi finals ===
Continental semi-finals – 16 riders from to Continental final

SF

- 13 June 1998 (Italy) Lonigo

Pos.	Rider	Points
1	(Poland) Rafał Dobrucki	14
2	(Poland) Piotr Świst	11
3	(Czech Republic) Marián Jirout	11
4	(Poland) Tomasz Bajerski	10
5	(Czech Republic) Tomáš Topinka	10
6	(Poland) Jacek Rempala	9
7	(Italy) Andrea Maida	9
8	(Russia) Roman Povazhny	9
9	(Germany) Matthias Kröger	9
10	(Germany) Robert Barth	7
11	(Hungary) Laszlo Bodi	5
12	(Germany) Joachim Kugelmann	4
13	(Austria) Andreas Bössner	3
14	(Ukraine) Alexander Liatosinski	3
15	(France) Philippe Bergé	2
16	(Italy) Alessandro Dalla Valle	2
17	(Italy) Stefano Alfonso	2
18	(Austria) Thomas Stadler	0

SF

- 14 June 1998 (Croatia) Prelog

Pos.	Rider	Points
1	(Czech Republic) Antonín Kasper Jr.	15
2	(Australia) Todd Wiltshire	13
3	(Poland) Adam Fajfer	12
4	(Hungary) Sándor Tihanyi	11
5	(Poland) Sławomir Drabik	10
6	(Slovenia) Matej Ferjan	9
7	(Hungary) Róbert Nagy	7
8	(Poland) Roman Jankowski	7
9	(Russia) Rinat Mardanshin	7
10	(Slovenia) Izak Šantej	6
11	(Hungary) Norbert Magosi	6
12	(Slovenia) Gerhard Lekse	5
13	(Russia) Michail Starostin	5
14	(Czech Republic) Bohumil Brhel	4
15	(Czech Republic) George Štancl	3
16	(Czech Republic) Karel Průša Jr.	0

== Third round ==
- 12 riders from positions 9-20 from the 1998 Speedway Grand Prix to GP Challenge

=== Intercontinental Final ===
2 riders direct to Grand Prix, 6 riders to GP Challenge

=== Continental Final ===
- 2 riders direct to Grand Prix, 5 riders to GP Challenge
- 25 July 1998 (Hungary) Debrecen

Pos.	Rider	Points
1	(Czech Republic) Antonín Kasper Jr.	13
2	(Czech Republic) Marián Jirout	11
3	(Russia) Roman Povazhny	10
4	(Hungary) Róbert Nagy	10
5	(Poland) Sławomir Drabik	9
6	(Hungary) Sándor Tihanyi	9
7	(Poland) Piotr Świst	9
8	(Poland) Adam Fajfer	9
9	(Poland) Rafał Dobrucki	8
10	(Czech Republic) Tomáš Topinka	8
11	(Poland) Jacek Rempala	7
12	(Slovenia) Matej Ferjan	6
13	(Australia) Todd Wiltshire	5
14	(Italy) Andrea Maida	4
15	(Poland) Tomasz Bajerski	1
16	(Poland) Roman Jankowski	1

== Final Round ==
=== GP Challenge ===
8 riders to 1998 Grand Prix

- 3 October 1998 (Czech Republic) Pardubice

Pos.	Rider	pre-qual	qual	sf	Final
1	(Australia) Leigh Adams	x	3, 3	3	3
2	(Denmark) Brian Andersen	x	2, 2	2	2
3	(Sweden) Henrik Gustafsson	x	2, 1, 3	3	1
4	(England) Andy Smith	x	1, 2, 2	2	0
5	(Sweden) Stefan Dannö	x	3, 3	1	x
6	(Sweden) Mikael Karlsson	2, 2	2, 2	1	x
7	(England) Joe Screen	2, 3	1, 3	0	x
8	(Denmark) John Jørgensen	1, 3	3, 3	0	x
9	(England) Mark Loram	x	3, 0, 1	x	x
10	(Denmark) Nicki Pedersen	3, 3	1, 3, 1	x	x
11	(Hungary) Zoltán Adorján	x	2, 0, 0	x	x
12	(United States) Sam Ermolenko	2, 0	2, 1, 2	x	x
13	(Italy) Armando Castagna	x	0, 1	x	x
14	(Poland) Sebastian Ulamek	3, 2	0, 1	x	x
15	(Denmark) Jesper B Jensen	3, 1	3, 0, 0	x	x
16	(Poland) Piotr Świst	0, 2	2, 0, 0	x	x
17	(Australia) Craig Boyce	2, 0	1	x	x
18	(England) Gary Havelock	1, 2	1	x	x
19	(Poland) Piotr Protasiewicz	3, 1	0	x	x
20	(Hungary) Sándor Tihanyi	0, 3	0	x	x
21	(Denmark) Ronni Pedersen	1, 1	x	x	x
22	(Poland) Sławomir Drabik	0, 1	x	x	x
23	(Russia) Roman Povazhny	1, 0	x	x	x
24	(Hungary) Róbert Nagy	0, 0	x	x	x
