= 1995 Speedway World Team Cup =

36th edition of the annual motorcycle speedway World Cup competition

Seasons
- ← 1994 1996 →

The 1995 Speedway World Team Cup was the 36th edition of the FIM Speedway World Team Cup to determine the team world champions.

The final took place at the Polonia Bydgoszcz Stadium in Poland. Hans Nielsen (paired with Tommy Knudsen) won his tenth gold medal and in the process sent Denmark to their tenth title success and clear of England in the all time winners list.

== First round ==
- 4 June 1995
- (Russia) Stroitel Stadium, Togliatti

1st	2nd	3rd
Ukraine 37; 10.Igor Marko (3,2,3,3,3,3) - 17; 11.Vladimir Kolodiy (1,2,3,3,1,3) - 13; 12.Aleksandr Lyatosinskiy (2,2,-,2,1,-) - 7	Latvia 32; 1.Nikolay Kokin (2,3,1,1,2,-) - 9; 2.Vladimir Voronkov (3,2,f/x,3,3/2) - 13; 3.Andrey Korolyov (2,3,-,1,2,2) - 10	Russia 29; 4.Oleg Kurguskin (3,3,3,3,e,f/x) - 12; 5.Sergey Jeroshin (2,3,2,2,2,f/x) - 11; 6.Roman Povazhny - (f/x,0,-,3,3,-) - 6

4th	5th	not started
Croatia 12; 13.Zlatko Kržnarič (0,1,2,1,0,2) - 6; 14.Renato Kušter (1,1,e,0,0,1) - 3; 15.Željko Feher (0,1,-,2,0,-) - 3	France 10; 7.Thierry Bouin (0,0,1,0,0,-) - 1; 8.Christophe Dubernard (1,1,0,1,2,1) - 6; 9.Stephane Tresarrieu (1,f,*,*,1,1) - 3	Slovakia; Bulgaria

Ukraine and Latvia to second round

== Second round ==
- 2 July 1995
- (Slovenia) Matija Gubec Stadium, Krško

Placing	Pair / Rider Name	Total	1	2	3	4	5	6	7	8	9	10	11	12	13	14	15	16	17	18	19	20	21	22
1	Norway	26							8							16							26
1	(1) Lars Gunnestad	15	3			X				3			3				3			3
1	(2) Rune Holta	11	2			3				1			1				2			2
1	(15) -	0
2	Ukraine	22 +3							5							14							22
2	(3) Vladimir Kolody	7	1				1				1			2				2			E
2	(4) Igor Marko	15	0				3				3			3				3			3			3
2	(16) Aleksandr Lyatosinsky	0
3	Slovenia	22 +2							5							12							22
3	(5) Martin Peterca	1		1			0			-					-				-			-
3	(6) Gerhard Lekse	15		2			2			2					3				3			3		2
3	(17) Gregor Pintar	6								0					2				2			2
4	Austria	18							6							13							18
4	(13) Franz Leitner	8				2			2			1				0			1		2
4	(14) Heinrich Schatzer	9				1			1			3				3			-		1
4	(21) Helmut Lercher	1										0							1
5	Latvia	16							6							11							16
5	(7) Nikolay Kokin	6		-				2			0					-				1			3
5	(8) Vladimir Voronkov	2		0				-			-					2				-			-
5	(18) Andrey Korolevs	8		3				1			2					1				0			1
6	New Zealand	12							7							10							12
6	(9) Mark Thorpe	10			3			3				2		1			1					E
6	(10) Tony Briggs	2			1			0				0		F			0					1
6	(19) Tommy Spekler	0
7	Finland	11							5							8							11
7	(11) Vesa Ylinen	8			E				3				2		1			0					2
7	(12) Kai Laukkanen	3			2				E				0		0			1					0
7	(20) -	0
Placing	Pair / Rider Name	Total	1	2	3	4	5	6	7	8	9	10	11	12	13	14	15	16	17	18	19	20	21	22

m - exclusion for exceeding two minute time allowance • t - exclusion for touching the tapes • x - other exclusion • e - retired or mechanical failure • f - fell
ns - non-starter • nc - non-classify

gate A - inside	gate B	gate C	gate D - outside

Norway and Ukraine to third round

== Third round ==
- 26 August 1995
- (Germany) Rottalstadion, Pocking

Placing	Pair / Rider Name	Total	1	2	3	4	5	6	7	8	9	10	11	12	13	14	15	16	17	18	19	20	21	22
1	England	28							10							19							28
1	(11) Mark Loram	15			2				2				3		2			3					3
1	(12) Chris Louis	13			3				3				1		3			2					1
1	(20) Steve Schofield	0
2	Norway	23							10							17							23
2	(1) Lars Gunnestad	10	3			2				3			0				1			1
2	(2) Rune Holta	13	2			3				2			2				2			2
2	(15) -	0
3	Germany	18 +3							2							8							18
3	(13) Gerd Riss	12				0			1			3				2			3		3			3
3	(14) Robert Barth	6				1			0			-				1			2		2
3	(21) Andre Pollehn	0										0
4	Czech Republic	18 +2							4							10							18
4	(9) Antonín Kasper Jr.	12			0			1				2		3			3					3
4	(10) Tomas Topinka	6			1			2				1		0			0					2		2
4	(19) Roman Matoušek	0
5	Hungary	17							6							12							17
5	(7) Zoltán Adorján	17		3				3			3					3				3			2
5	(8) Róbert Nagy	0		0				-			0					-				-			0
5	(18) Csaba Hell	0						0								0				0
6	Italy	14							6							12							14
6	(3) Stefano Alfonso	8	0				3				2			2				1			F
6	(4) Armando Castagna	6	1				2				1			1				-			1
6	(16) Andrea Maida	0																0
7	Ukraine	7							4							5							7
7	(5) Vladimir Kolody	5		2			1			1					F				0			1
7	(6) Igor Marko	1		1			0			-					X				-			-
7	(17) Aleksandr Lyatosinsky	1								0									1			0
Placing	Pair / Rider Name	Total	1	2	3	4	5	6	7	8	9	10	11	12	13	14	15	16	17	18	19	20	21	22

m - exclusion for exceeding two minute time allowance • t - exclusion for touching the tapes • x - other exclusion • e - retired or mechanical failure • f - fell
ns - non-starter • nc - non-classify

gate A - inside	gate B	gate C	gate D - outside

England and Norway to World final

== World Final ==
- 24 September 1995
- (Poland) Polonia Bydgoszcz Stadium, Bydgoszcz

Placing	Pair / Rider Name	Total	1	2	3	4	5	6	7	8	9	10	11	12	13	14	15	16	17	18	19	20	21	22
1	Denmark	28							10							20							28
1	(3) Hans Nielsen	13	3				2				2			3				3			-
1	(4) Tommy Knudsen	15	2				3				3			2				2			3
1	(16) Brian Karger	0																			0
2	England	22							7							16							22
2	(13) Mark Loram	11				1			2			3				1			3		1
2	(14) Chris Louis	11				3			1			2				3			0		2
2	(21) Steve Schofield	0
3	(United States) USA	19 +3							4							11							19
3	(5) Sam Ermolenko	9		1			1			2					1				2			2
3	(6) Billy Hamill	2		2			0			-					-				-			-
3	(17) Greg Hancock	8								1					3				1			3		3
4	Sweden	19 +2							6							13							19
4	(11) Tony Rickardsson	15			3				3				3		2			1					3	2
4	(12) Henrik Gustafsson	4			0				-				2		0			0					2
4	(20) Peter Karlsson	0							0
5	Australia	14							8							10							14
5	(9) Craig Boyce	6			1			3				1		-			1					0
5	(10) Jason Crump	8			2			2				0		1			2					1
5	(19) Leigh Adams	0												0
6	Poland	13							3							7							13
6	(1) Tomasz Gollob	12	1			2				3			F				3			3
6	(2) Jacek Gollob	1	0			0				-			1				0			E
6	(15) Rafal Dobrucki	0								0
7	Norway	11							4							7							11
7	(7) Lars Gunnestad	8		3				1			1					2				1			E
7	(8) Rune Holta	3		0				0			0					-				2			1
7	(18) Arnt Forland	0														0
Placing	Pair / Rider Name	Total	1	2	3	4	5	6	7	8	9	10	11	12	13	14	15	16	17	18	19	20	21	22

m - exclusion for exceeding two minute time allowance • t - exclusion for touching the tapes • x - other exclusion • e - retired or mechanical failure • f - fell
ns - non-starter • nc - non-classify

gate A - inside	gate B	gate C	gate D - outside

== See also ==
- 1995 Speedway Grand Prix
