= 1994 Speedway World Team Cup =

35th edition of the annual motorcycle speedway World Cup competition

Seasons
- ← 1993 1995 →

The 1994 Speedway World Team Cup was the 35th edition of the FIM Speedway World Team Cup to determine the team world champions.

The format changed after the World Team Cup merged with the Speedway World Pairs Championship. Teams now consisted of just two riders with a reserve rider available if needed.

The final took place on 18 September at the Holsteinring at Brokstedt in Germany. Sweden won their seventh title, which was their first for 24 years since the 1970 Speedway World Team Cup.

== First round ==
- 5 June 1994
- (Slovenia) Ilirija Sports Park, Ljubljana

Placing	Pair / Rider Name	Total	1	2	3	4	5	6	7	8	9	10	11	12	13	14	15	16	17	18	19	20	21	22
1	Slovenia	30							10							20							30
1	(11) Gerhard Lekse	12			2				2				2		2			2					2
1	(12) Martin Peterca	18			3				3				3		3			3					3
1	(20) Gregor Pintar	0
2	Latvia	24							10							15							24
2	(1) Vladimir Voronkov	7	2			2				2			-				1			-
2	(2) Andrey Korolevs	12	3			-				3			0				3			3
2	(15) Nikolay Kokin	5				3							1							2
3	France	20							5							13							20
3	(9) Christophe Dubernard	9			1			3				3		0			-					2
3	(10) Stéphane Trésarrieu	1			0			1				-		-			0					-
3	(19) Philippe Bergé	10										2		3			2					3
4	(Netherlands) Nederlands	19							5							13							19
4	(3) Rob Steman	13	1				3				3			2				1			3
4	(4) Patrick Verbrugge	4	0				-				2			-				-			2
4	(16) Roy Verbrugge	2					1							1				0
5	Ukraine	12							5							7							12
5	(5) Dmitry Grezin	0		-			-			-					-				-			-
5	(6) Aleksandr Lyatosinsky	3		1			0			0					0				2			0
5	(17) Vladimir Kolody	9		2			2			1					1				3			0
6	Slovakia	11							5							9							11
6	(7) Gaspar Forgač	7		3				2			1					1				-			E
6	(8) Vladimir Visvader	4		0				0			E					2				1			1
6	(18) -	0
7	Belarus	8							2							6							8
7	(13) Viktor Sidorenko	6				0			1			1				3			1		0
7	(14) Sergey Manuilov	2				1			0			0				0			0		1
7	(21) Leonid Taranov	0
Placing	Pair / Rider Name	Total	1	2	3	4	5	6	7	8	9	10	11	12	13	14	15	16	17	18	19	20	21	22

m - exclusion for exceeding two minute time allowance • t - exclusion for touching the tapes • x - other exclusion • e - retired or mechanical failure • f - fell
ns - non-starter • nc - non-classify

gate A - inside	gate B	gate C	gate D - outside

Slovenia and Latvia to second round

== Second round ==
- 3 July 1994
- (Italy) Santa Marina Stadium, Lonigo

Placing	Pair / Rider Name	Total	1	2	3	4	5	6	7	8	9	10	11	12	13	14	15	16	17	18	19	20	21	22
1	Norway	29							10							20							29
1	(5) Lars Gunnestad	16		2			2			3					3				3			3
1	(6) Rune Holta	13		3			3			2					2				2			1
1	(17) Einar Kyllingstad	0
2	Italy	25							9							15							25
2	(11) Armando Castagna	15			3				3				2		1			3					3
2	(12) Andrea Maida	10			2				1				3		0			2					2
2	(20) Stefano Alfonso	0
3	Finland	18							5							14							18
3	(13) Vesa Ylinen	13				3			2			2				3			1		2
3	(14) Mika Pellinen	5				E			0			3				1			1		0
3	(3b) 21	-0
4	Austria	15							2							10							15
4	(3) Walter Nebel	1	0				1				-			-				-			-
4	(4) Franz Leitner	7	1				F				0			2				1			3
4	(16) Heinrich Schatzer	7									3			3				0			1
5	Slovenia	15							8							10							15
5	(1) Martin Peterca	12	3			2				1			1				3			2
5	(2) Gerhard Lekse	3	2			1				0			0				e			0
5	(15) Gregor Pintar	0
6	Russia	12							6							8							12
6	(9) Oleg Kurguskin	0
6	(10) Rinat Mardanshin	9			0			3				1		1			2					2
6	(19) Flyur Kalimullin	3			1			2				0		0			E					0
7	Latvia	12							2							7							12
7	(7) Vladimir Voronkov	2		1				1			-					0				-			-
7	(8) Andrey Korolevs	2		0				-			1					-				1			0
7	(18) Nikolay Kokin	8						F			2					2				3			1
Placing	Pair / Rider Name	Total	1	2	3	4	5	6	7	8	9	10	11	12	13	14	15	16	17	18	19	20	21	22

m - exclusion for exceeding two minute time allowance • t - exclusion for touching the tapes • x - other exclusion • e - retired or mechanical failure • f - fell
ns - non-starter • nc - non-classify

gate A - inside	gate B	gate C	gate D - outside

Norway and Italy to third round.

== Third round ==
- 4 September 1994
- (Poland) Olympic Stadium, Wrocław

Placing	Pair / Rider Name	Total	1	2	3	4	5	6	7	8	9	10	11	12	13	14	15	16	17	18	19	20	21	22
1	Australia	26							8							16							26
1	(3) Leigh Adams	13	-				3				3			2				3			2
1	(4) Craig Boyce	1	1				-				-			-				-			-
1	(16) Jason Crump	12	2				2				0			3				2			3
2	Poland	24							8							17							24
2	(1) Tomasz Gollob	12	X			2				3			2				3			2
2	(2) Dariusz Śledź	12	3			3				1			3				2			0
2	(15) Jacek Gollob	0
3	Czech Republic	21							6							14							21
3	(7) Bohumil Brhel	4		2				1			1					-				-			-
3	(8) Antonin Kasper, Jr.	10		E				3			2					2				1			2
3	(18) Tomas Topinka	7														3				3			1
4	Italy	16							5							10							16
4	(5) Armando Castagna	13		3			1			2					2				2			3
4	(6) Andrea Maida	2		1			0			-					1				-			0
4	(17) Stefano Alfonso	1								0									1
5	Hungary	15							5							11							15
5	(9) Laszlo Bodi	5			0			-				2		1			0					2
5	(10) Zoltán Adorján	10			3			2				3		0			1					1
5	(19) Zoltan Hajdu	0						0
6	Norway	13							5							9							13
6	(11) Lars Gunnestad	11			1				2				1		3			1					3
6	(12) Rune Holta	2			2				F				0		F			-					0
6	(20) Arnt Førland	0																0
7	New Zealand	11							5							7							11
7	(13) Mitch Shirra	8				F			3			1				0			3		1
7	(14) Tony Briggs	0
7	(21) Mark Thorpe	3				1			1			E				1			F		0
Placing	Pair / Rider Name	Total	1	2	3	4	5	6	7	8	9	10	11	12	13	14	15	16	17	18	19	20	21	22

m - exclusion for exceeding two minute time allowance • t - exclusion for touching the tapes • x - other exclusion • e - retired or mechanical failure • f - fell
ns - non-starter • nc - non-classify

gate A - inside	gate B	gate C	gate D - outside

Australia and Poland to World final.

== World Final ==
- 18 September 1994
- (Germany) Holsteinring, Brokstedt

Placing	Pair / Rider Name	Total	1	2	3	4	5	6	7	8	9	10	11	12	13	14	15	16	17	18	19	20	21	22
1	Sweden	23							6							13							23
1	(1) Tony Rickardsson	12	3			2				1			1				2			3
1	(2) Henrik Gustafsson	11	0			1				2			3				3			2
1	(15) Mikael Karlsson	0
2	Poland	20							7							14							20
2	(13) Tomasz Gollob	16				3			3			1				3			3		3
2	(14) Dariusz Śledź	0				0			-			-				-			-		-
2	(21) Jacek Gollob	4							1			3				0			X		0
3	Denmark	17 +3							5							11							17
3	(3) Hans Nielsen	5	1				2				0			0				-			2
3	(4) Tommy Knudsen	12	2				0				3			3				3			1			3
3	(16) Jan Staechmann	0																0
4	Australia	17 +2							6							11							17
4	(9) Leigh Adams	7			0			1				2		2			0					2
4	(10) Craig Boyce	10			2			3				0		1			1					3		2
4	(19) Jason Crump	0
5	(United States) USA	17 +1							6							12							17
5	(7) Sam Ermolenko	12		3				2			1					2				1			3	1
5	(8) Greg Hancock	5		1				0			2					1				0			1
5	(18) Billy Hamill	0
6	Germany	16							6							11							16
6	(11) Gerd Riss	12			1				2				2		3			2					2
6	(12) Andre Pollehn	3			3				0				0		0			-					-
6	(20) Robert Barth	1																1					0
7	England	16							6							12							16
7	(5) Gary Havelock	3		0			3			0					-				-			0
7	(6) Mark Loram	9		2			1			3					1				1			1
7	(17) Chris Louis	4													2				2
Placing	Pair / Rider Name	Total	1	2	3	4	5	6	7	8	9	10	11	12	13	14	15	16	17	18	19	20	21	22

m - exclusion for exceeding two minute time allowance • t - exclusion for touching the tapes • x - other exclusion • e - retired or mechanical failure • f - fell
ns - non-starter • nc - non-classify

gate A - inside	gate B	gate C	gate D - outside

== See also ==
- 1994 Individual Speedway World Championship
