= 2000 Speedway World Team Cup =

41st edition of the annual motorcycle speedway World Cup competition

Speedway World Team Cup

The 2000 Speedway World Team Cup was the 41st edition of the FIM Speedway World Team Cup to determine the team world champions. It was the last time that the event was known as the Speedway World Team Cup because as from 2001 it was called the Speedway World Cup.

The final took place at Brandon Stadium in Coventry, England. The World Championship was decided by a race-off after Sweden and Great Britain tied on 40 points. Tony Rickardsson beat Mark Loram to give Sweden an eighth title.

== Quarter-final ==
- 6 May (Netherlands) Stichting Baansport Blijham, Blijham

First	Second	Third	Fourth
Norway 46; 6.Rune Holta (3,3,3,3,3,2) - 17; 7.Björn G. Hansen (2,2,0,0,2,3) - 9; 8.Lars Gunnestad (1,3,3,3,3,3) - 16; 9.Tor Einar Hielm (0,2,0,-,F/X,-) - 2; 10.Kenneth Borgenhaug (-,-,-,2,-,0) - 2	Finland 42+3; 1.Kaj Laukkanen (3,3,3,2,2,1) - 14; 2.Petri Kokko (2,1,2,1,3,3) - 12+3; 3.Tomi Reima (1,1,-,-,1,-) - 3; 4.Kauko Nieminen (3,0,2,F/X,2,3) - 10; 5.Toni Salmela (-,-,1,1,-,1) - 3	Russia 42+2; 11.Roman Povazhny (3,3,2,3,0,2) - 13; 12.Eduard Shaihullin (2,2,1,2,1,0) - 8; 13.Rinat Mardanshin (X,2,3,2,3,2) - 12+2; 14.Talgat Galeev (1,-,-,-,-,-) - 1; 15.Sergey Eroshin (-,0,2,3,2,1) - 8	Netherlands 14; 16.Roy Verbrugge (2,1,0,1,1,1) - 6; 17.Henk Bos (-,0,-,-,0,0) - 0; 18.Emiel Groen (0,1,0,0,0,F/X) - 1; 19.Erik Eijbergen (1,0,1,-,1,-) - 3; 20.Jim Groen (0,-,1,0/1,-,2) - 4

Norway to Semi-Final

- 3 June (Italy) Santa Marina Stadium, Lonigo

First	Second	Third	Fourth
Italy 50; Andrea Maida (3,3,3,2,2,3) - 16; Stefano Alfonso (2,2,0,1,0,2) - 7 Alessandro Dalla Valle (3,3,1,3,3,1) - 14; Simone Tadiello (2,-,-,2,-,-) - 4 Armando Castagna (-,2,2,-,2,3) - 9	Slovenia 39+3; Aleš Dolinar (0,-,-,2,1,0) - 4 Gerhard Lekse (2,F,F,-,-,-) - 2 Izak Šantej (1,2,3,3,2,2) - 13; Jernej Kolenko (0,1,3,0,-,-) - 4 Matej Ferjan (-,3,3,F,3/2,3/3) - 17+3	Hungary 39+F; Sandor Tihanyi (1,1,-,3,3,0) - 8 Zoltan Adorjan (X,3,2,0,-,1) - 6 Attila Stefani (2,-,1,2,1,2) - 8 Robert Nagy (3,2,1,0,1,3) - 10+F; Laszlo Szatmari (-,3,2,-,-,2,-) - 7	France 16; Sebastien Tresarrieu (E,1,2,3,0,F) - 6 Stephane Tresarrieu (1,0,-,1,1,1) - 4 Jeremy Barraud (1,1,1,0,-,1) - 4 Fabrice Ostyn (0,-,F,1,0,-) - 1 Christophe Dubernard (-,0,x,-,1,0) - 1

Italy to Semi-Final

== Semi-final ==
- 22 July (Poland) Arena Częstochowa, Częstochowa

First	Second	Third	Fourth
Sweden 50; 1.Tony Rickardsson (1,2,2,2,3,3) - 13; 2.Mikael Karlsson (2,3,3,1,2,1) - 12; 3.Peter Karlsson (2,2,2,2,1,1) - 10; 4.Henrik Gustafsson (3,3,3,1,2,3) - 15; 5.Niklas Klingberg - NS	Poland 46; Rafał Dobrucki (1,3,0,-,-,-) - 4 Piotr Protasiewicz (3,2,1,3,3,1) - 13; Tomasz Gollob (0,3,3,3,3,3) - 15; Grzegorz Walasek (3,2,2,2,0,1) - 10; Sebastian Ułamek (-,-,-,0,2,2) - 4	Czech Republic 25; 16.Aleš Dryml Jr. (0,1,-,-,E,0) - 1; 17.Bohumil Brhel (1,0,3,3,1,3) - 11; 18.Antonín Šváb Jr. (1,1,1,1,0,0) - 4; 19.Marian Jirout (0,0,0,-,-,-) - 0; 20.Antonin Kasper (-,-,2,2/2,1,2) - 9	Norway 23; Lars Gunnestad 12; Rune Holta 11; Björn G Hansen 0 Tor Einar Hielm 0 Trond Skretting 0

Sweden to World Final

- 15 July (Germany) Ellermühle Speedway Stadium, Landshut

First	Second	Third	Fourth
United States 52; Greg Hancock (2,2,2,2,1,3) - 12; John Cook (3,3,3,1,F,2) - 12; Billy Hamill (3,3,3,3,3,3) - 18; Ronnie Correy (2,2,1,2,1,2) - 10	Denmark 46; Nicki Pedersen (2,3,2,3,2,3) - 15; Jesper B. Jensen (3,2,0,1,-,-) - 6 Brian Karger (1,2,3,1,2,1) - 10; Brian Andersen (E,3,2,2,3,0) - 10; Bjarne Pedersen (-,-,-,-,3,2) - 5	Germany 25; Robert Barth (1,1,3,3,1,1) - 10; Joachim Kugelmann (0,0,-,-,2,0) - 2 Matthias Kröger (3,0,E,0,2,2) - 7 Robbie Kessler (1,1,1,3,0,F) - 6 Mirko Wolter (-,-,E,0,-,-) - 0	Italy 20; Andrea Maida (2,0,0,0,0,0) - 2 Stefano Alfonso (0,1,1,2,3,1) - 8 Alessandro Dalla Valle (0,F,F,0,0,3) - 3 Armando Castagna (1,1,2,1,1,1) - 7 Simone Tadiello - NS

USA to World Final

== World final ==
- 17 September (England) Brandon Stadium, Coventry

First	Second	Third	Fourth
Sweden 40+3; Tony Rickardsson (3,3,3,3,2,2) - 16+3; Mikael Karlsson (1,1,0,0,-,-) - 2 Henrik Gustafsson (3,0,0,2,2,3) - 10; Peter Karlsson (1,2,3,3,1,2) - 12; Niklas Klingberg (-,-,-,-,F,0) - 0	England 40+X; Mark Loram (3,1,2,2,3,0) - 11+X; Chris Louis (1,2,1,1,0,3) - 8 Joe Screen (2,3,1,3,0,3) - 12; Martin Dugard (F,2,2,F,-,-) - 4 Carl Stonehewer (-,-,-,-,3,2) - 5	United States 35; Billy Hamill (2,2,2,1,2,1) - 10; Sam Ermolenko (F,-,1,0,1,0) - 2 Greg Hancock (2,3,3,3,2,3) - 16; John Cook (3,1,0,1,1,1) - 7 Brent Werner (-,0,-,-,-,-) - 0	Australia 29; Jason Crump (2,E,3,2,3,2/1) - 13; Todd Wiltshire (0,1,-,-1,-) - 2 Leigh Adams (1,3,2,2,3,1/0) - 12; Ryan Sullivan (0,0,1,1,0,-) - 2 Craig Boyce (-,-,0,F,-,-) - 0

Sweden win Championship after Tony Rickardsson beat Mark Loram in a race off.

== See also ==
- 2000 Speedway Grand Prix
