= 1989 Speedway World Pairs Championship =

20th edition of the World motorcycle speedway Pairs Championship

1989 World Pairs Championship

Seasons
- ← 1988 1990 →

The 1989 Speedway World Pairs Championship was the twentieth FIM Speedway World Pairs Championship. The final took place in Leszno, Poland. The championship was won by Denmark (48 points) who beat Sweden (44 points) and England (37 points).

== Semi final 1 ==
- (Denmark) Fjelsted Speedway Stadium, Harndrup
- 9 July

Pos.	Team	Rider	Points
1	Denmark (48 pts)	Hans Nielsen	25
1	Denmark (48 pts)	Erik Gundersen	23
2	Sweden (41 pts)	Henka Gustafsson	23
2	Sweden (41 pts)	Jimmy Nilsen	18
3	Finland (34 pts)	Kai Niemi	24
3	Finland (34 pts)	Olli Tyrväinen	10
4	Australia (32 pts)	Troy Butler	23
4	Australia (32 pts)	Stephen Davies	9
5	Norway (31 pts)	Lars Gunnestad	21
5	Norway (31 pts)	Einar Kyllingstad	10
6	New Zealand (31 pts)	Mitch Shirra	20
6	New Zealand (31 pts)	Gary Allan	11
7	Soviet Union (30 pts)	Vladimir Trofimov	15
7	Soviet Union (30 pts)	Rif Saitgareev	15
8	Netherlands (17 pts)	Rene Elzinga	10
8	Netherlands (17 pts)	Ron Koppe	7
9	Belgium (6 pts)	Frans Cools	3
9	Belgium (6 pts)	Geert Cools	3

== Semi final 2 ==
- (Socialist Federal Republic of Yugoslavia) Ilirija Sports Park, Ljubljana
- 9 July

Pos.	Team	Rider	Points
1	West Germany (47 pts)	Gerd Riss	24
1	West Germany (47 pts)	Karl Maier	24
2	Hungary (43 pts)	Zoltán Adorján	22
2	Hungary (43 pts)	Antal Kocso	21
3	Czechoslovakia (38 pts)	Roman Matoušek	23
3	Czechoslovakia (38 pts)	Petr Vandírek	15
4	Italy (38 pts)	Armando Castagna	23
4	Italy (38 pts)	Valentino Furlanetto	15
5	United States (37 pts)	Lance King	19
5	United States (37 pts)	Rick Miller	18
6	Bulgaria (19 pts)	Giorgi Petranov	13
6	Bulgaria (19 pts)	Zacharia Jordanov	6
7	Austria (18 pts)	Heinrich Schatzer	11
7	Austria (18 pts)	Walter Nebel	7
8	Yugoslavia (17 pts)	Gregor Pintar	17
8	Yugoslavia (17 pts)	Artur Horvat	2
9	France (12 pts)	Thierry Hillaire	12
9	France (12 pts)	Joel Tresarrieu	0

== World final ==
- (Poland) Alfred Smoczyk Stadium, Leszno
- 5 August

Pos.	Team	Rider	Points
1st	Denmark (48 pts)	Hans Nielsen	28
1st	Denmark (48 pts)	Erik Gundersen	20
2nd	Sweden (44 pts)	Jimmy Nilsen	23
2nd	Sweden (44 pts)	Per Jonsson	21
3rd	England (37 pts)	Kelvin Tatum	21
3rd	England (37 pts)	Paul Thorp	16
4	West Germany (36 pts)	Karl Maier	22
4	West Germany (36 pts)	Gerd Riss	14
5	Finland (31 pts)	Kai Niemi	18
5	Finland (31 pts)	Olli Tyrväinen	13
6	Hungary (22 pts)	Antal Kocso	14
6	Hungary (22 pts)	Zoltán Adorján	8
7	Czechoslovakia (25 pts)	Bohumil Brhel	14
7	Czechoslovakia (25 pts)	Zdeněk Tesař	11
8	Italy (15 pts)	Armando Dal Chiele	9
8	Italy (15 pts)	Valentino Furlanetto	6
9	Poland (11 pts)	Piotr Świst	11
9	Poland (11 pts)	Roman Jankowski	0

== See also ==
- 1989 Individual Speedway World Championship
- 1989 Speedway World Team Cup
- motorcycle speedway
- 1989 in sports
