= Italian Individual Speedway Championship =

Italian motorcycle speedway competition

- Sport: Motorcycle speedway
- Founded: 1948
- Most titles: Armando Castagna (13)

The Italian Individual Speedway Championship (Italian: Campionato Italiano Speedway Individuale Open) is the national individual motorcycle speedway championship of Italy. The championship is contested over a series of rounds and is open to foreign riders.

Armando Castagna holds the record number of victories with 13 and in 2025, his son Michele Paco Castagna won his fifth title.

== Past winners ==
Year	Winner	2nd	3rd	Ref
1948	Dario Basso			
1967	Domenico Pietrogrande			
1968	Luigi Giordano Bon			
1969	Giuseppe Pizzo	Annibale Pretto	Gianni Pizzo	
1970	Ermano Feddele	Gianni Pizzo	Annibale Pretto	
1971	Annibale Pretto	Gianni Pizzo	Giuseppe Pizzo	
1972	Gianni Pizzo	Mauro Ferraccioli	Annibale Pretto	
1973	Annibale Pretto	Mauro Ferraccioli	Francesco Biginato	
1974	Mauro Ferraccioli	Giuseppe Marzotto	Sandro Pastorelli	
1975	Giuseppe Marzotto	Francesco Biginato	Sandro Pastorelli	
1976	Giuseppe Marzotto	Mauro Ferraccioli	Sandro Pastorelli	
1977	Giuseppe Marzotto	Mauro Ferraccioli	Sandro Pastorelli	
1978	Giuseppe Marzotto	Mauro Ferraccioli	Gianni Brizzolari	
1979	Francesco Biginato	Mauro Ferraccioli	Giuseppe Marzotto	
1980	Francesco Biginato	Mauro Ferraccioli	Giuseppe Marzotto	
1981	Mauro Ferraccioli	Gianni Famari	Luigi Bazan	
1982	Francesco Biginato	Mauro Ferraccioli	Gianni Famari	
1983	Giuseppe Marzotto	Gianni Brizzolari	Armando Dal Chiele	
1984	Armando Castagna	Gianni Famari	Armando Dal Chiele	
1985	Armando Castagna	Armando Dal Chiele	Valentino Furlanetto	
1986	Armando Castagna	Valentino Furlanetto	Armando Dal Chiele	
1987	Valentino Furlanetto	Armando Castagna	Paolo Salvatelli	
1988	Armando Castagna	Armando Dal Chiele	Valentino Furlanetto	
1989	Valentino Furlanetto	Fabrizio Vesprini	Gianni Famari	
1990	Armando Castagna	Valentino Furlanetto	Armando Dal Chiele	
1991	Armando Castagna	Valentino Furlanetto	Armando Dal Chiele	
1992	Armando Castagna	Armando Dal Chiele	Paolo Salvatelli	
1993	Armando Castagna	Valentino Furlanetto	Armando Dal Chiele	
1994	Armando Castagna	Valentino Furlanetto	Andrea Maida	
1995	Armando Castagna	Stefano Alfonso	Andrea Maida	
1996	Andrea Maida	Stefano Alfonso	Massimo Mora	
1997	Andrea Maida	Alessandro Dalla Valle	Massimo Mora	
1998	Stefano Alfonso	Andrea Maida	Alessandro Dalla Valle	
1999	Andrea Maida	Stefano Alfonso	Graziano Francheti	
2000	Armando Castagna	Stefano Alfonso	Andrea Maida	
2001	Armando Castagna	Andrea Maida	Alessandro Dalla Valle	
2002	Andrea Maida	Simone Terenzani	Stefano Alfonso	
2003	Andrea Maida	Alessandro Dalla Valle	Paolo Salvatelli	
2004	Emiliano Sanchez	Simone Terenzani	Andrea Maida	
2005	Emiliano Sanchez	Mattia Carpanese	Simone Terenzani	
2006	Mattia Carpanese	Simone Terenzani	Andrea Maida	
2007	Mattia Carpanese	Andrea Maida	Guglielmo Franchetti	
2008	Mattia Carpanese	Mattia Tadiello	Andrea Maida	
2009	Guglielmo Franchetti	Mattia Carpanese	Andrea Maida	
2010	Mattia Carpanese	Andrea Maida	Mattia Cavicchioli	
2011	Mattia Carpanese	Nico Covatti	Marco Gregnanin	
2012	Guglielmo Franchetti	Nico Covatti	Marco Gregnanin	
2013	Nico Covatti	Nicolas Vicentin	Paco Castagna	
2014	Mattia Carpanese	Paco Castagna	Nicolas Vicentin	
2015	Nico Covatti	Paco Castagna	Nicolas Vicentin	
2016	Nico Covatti	Paco Castagna	Guglielmo Franchetti	
2017	Paco Castagna	Nico Covatti	Nicolas Vicentin	
2018	Paco Castagna	Nico Covatti	Mattia Lenarduzzi	
2019	Nico Covatti	Paco Castagna	Nicolas Vicentin	
2020	Nico Covatti	Paco Castagna	Nicolas Vicentin	
2021	Nico Covatti	Paco Castagna	Nicolas Vicentin	
2022	Paco Castagna	Daniele Tessari	Nico Covatti	
2023	Nico Covatti	Paco Castagna	Nicolas Vicentin	
2024	Paco Castagna	Nicolas Vicentin	Matteo Boncinelli	
2025	Paco Castagna	Nico Covatti	Nicolas Vicentin	

== See also ==
- Sport in Italy
- Italy national speedway team
