= Simone Terenzani =

Italian motorcycle speedway rider (born 1978)

- Born: 23 June 1978 (age 48); Terenzano, Udine, Italy
- Nationality: Italian

Career history

Great Britain
- 2005: Hull Vikings

Individual honours
- 2002, 2004, 2006: Italian Championship silver

Simone Terenzani (born 1978) is an Italian motorcycle speedway rider who rode in 2005 Speedway Grand Prix and earned eight international caps.

== Career ==
Terenzani won the Italian Junior Championship in 1999. He made his debut in the British leagues after joining Hull Vikings for the 2005 Premier League speedway season.

Terenzani won the silver medal on three separate occasions at the Italian Individual Speedway Championship in 2002, 2004 and 2006.

== Results ==
=== World Championships ===
- Individual World Championship and Speedway Grand Prix
  - 2005 - 32nd place (0 pts in one event)
  - 2006 - did not start as track reserve
- Team World Championship (Speedway World Team Cup and Speedway World Cup)
  - 1998 - 5th place in Group B
  - 1999 - 2nd place in Quarter-Final A
  - 2003 - 12th place
  - 2004 - 7th place

=== European Championships ===
- European Pairs Championship
  - 2004 - 6th place in Semi-Final 1
  - 2005 - (Poland) Gdańsk - 6th place (1 pt)
  - 2006 - 6th place in Semi-Final 2

1999 Under-21 Italian champion

== See also ==
- Italy national speedway team
- List of Speedway Grand Prix riders
