= Giuseppe Marzotto =

Italian speedway rider (born 1944)

- Born: 30 January 1944 (age 82); Arzignano, Italy
- Nickname: Charlie Brown
- Nationality: Italian

Career history

Great Britain
- 1976: Wolverhampton Wolves

Individual honours
- 1975–1978, 1983: Italian Champion
- 1981: Argentine Champion

Giuseppe Marzotto (born 30 January 1944, in Arzignano) is a former Italian international motorcycle speedway rider.

== Career ==
Marzotto began competing in scooter gymkhanas at the age of 16, riding under the pseudonym "Charlie Brown" because his parents were opposed to him entering in such events. He won the Trofeo Nazionale Gincane four times from 1966–1969. When he was 19, he took up motocross and rode until 1974 before deciding to focus on speedway.

Marzotto's first speedway meeting was at Lonigo in 1968. In 1974, he finished runner-up in the Italian Speedway Championship and the following year won the title.

In 1976, Marzotto joined the Wolverhampton Wolves and rode in 11 meetings in the British League. His nicknamne of Charlie Brown was quickly adopted by the British press.

In 1977, Marzotto rode in three meetings for the MSC Olching Club, replacing Josef Angermüller after he died in a speedway accident. He also rode for the Italian team Moto Club La Favorita.

During his career, Marzotto won the Italian Championship five times and represented Italy in team and best pairs events. He also rode in Argentina and New Zealand. He helped Armando Castagna when he first began riding speedway, giving him advice and technical support. In 1981, he won the Argentine Championship.

In the late 1970s, Marzotto began to develop his own speedway motor. The first version was produced in 1979. The engine has become known as the GM (his initials). The first major success was achieved in 1983 when Egon Muller won the 1983 Speedway World Championship. Since then, the GM has won more than 40 world speedway and longtrack championships. He retired in 1985.
