= Italy national speedway team =

Motorcycle speedway national team from Italy

Italy
- Nation colour: Red, White and Green
- SWC wins: 0

The Italy national speedway team are one of the teams that compete in international team motorcycle speedway.

== History ==
The Italy speedway team first competed in the Speedway World Team Cup during the 1970 Speedway World Team Cup, finishing fourth in the Continental quarter final round. After missing the 1972 and 1973 events, the team were ever present from 1973 to 2000. However, they were one of the weaker nations and failed to reach a final during the years that the competition was known as the World Team Cup.

The team experienced a better record in the World Pairs Championship, hosting the final in 1984 and then reaching six finals from 1986 to 1992.

Since 2001, Italy have failed to make an impact in the World Cup or the Speedway of Nations introduced in 2018. They have however won a gold medal in the European Pairs during the 2016 European Pairs Speedway Championship, with Nicolás Covatti and Nicolas Vicentin.

== Major world finals ==
=== World Pairs Championships ===
Year	Venue	Standings (Pts)	Riders	Pts
1984	(Italy); Lonigo; Santa Marina Stadium	1. England (27); 2. Denmark (25); 3. New Zealand (25); 4. United States (19); 5. Australia (14); 6. (Czech Republic) Czechoslovakia (10); 7. Italy (6)	Armando Castagna	5
1984	(Italy); Lonigo; Santa Marina Stadium	1. England (27); 2. Denmark (25); 3. New Zealand (25); 4. United States (19); 5. Australia (14); 6. (Czech Republic) Czechoslovakia (10); 7. Italy (6)	Armando Dal Chiele	1
1986	(West Germany); Pocking; Rottalstadion	1. Denmark (46); 2. United States (46); 3. (Czech Republic) Czechoslovakia (32); 4. Sweden (32); 5. New Zealand (32); 6. West Germany (27); 7. England (23); 8. Italy (15); 9. Australia (15)	Valentino Furlanetto	8
1986	(West Germany); Pocking; Rottalstadion	1. Denmark (46); 2. United States (46); 3. (Czech Republic) Czechoslovakia (32); 4. Sweden (32); 5. New Zealand (32); 6. West Germany (27); 7. England (23); 8. Italy (15); 9. Australia (15)	Armando Castagna	7
1987	(Czechoslovakia); Pardubice; Svítkov Stadion	1. Denmark (52); 2. England (44); 3. United States (36); 4. New Zealand (36); 5. (Czech Republic) Czechoslovakia (30); 6. Finland (19); 7. Australia (21); 8. Italy (18); 9. Poland (14)	Armando Castagna	11
1987	(Czechoslovakia); Pardubice; Svítkov Stadion	1. Denmark (52); 2. England (44); 3. United States (36); 4. New Zealand (36); 5. (Czech Republic) Czechoslovakia (30); 6. Finland (19); 7. Australia (21); 8. Italy (18); 9. Poland (14)	Valentino Furlanetto	7
1988	(England); Bradford; Odsal Stadium	1. Denmark (45); 2. England (41); 3. United States (39); 4. New Zealand (32); 5. Sweden (26); 6. Hungary (25); 7. Italy (21); 8. West Germany (21); 9. Poland (17)	Armando Castagna	17
1988	(England); Bradford; Odsal Stadium	1. Denmark (45); 2. England (41); 3. United States (39); 4. New Zealand (32); 5. Sweden (26); 6. Hungary (25); 7. Italy (21); 8. West Germany (21); 9. Poland (17)	Valentino Furlanetto	4
1989	(Poland); Leszno; Alfred Smoczyk Stadium	1. Denmark (48); 2. Sweden (44); 3. England (37); 4. West Germany (36); 5. Finland (31); 6. Hungary (22); 7. Czechoslovakia (25); 8. Italy (15); 9. Poland (11)	Armando Dal Chiele	9
1989	(Poland); Leszno; Alfred Smoczyk Stadium	1. Denmark (48); 2. Sweden (44); 3. England (37); 4. West Germany (36); 5. Finland (31); 6. Hungary (22); 7. Czechoslovakia (25); 8. Italy (15); 9. Poland (11)	Valentino Furlanetto	6
1991	(Poland); Poznan; Olimpia Poznań Stadium	1. Denmark (28); 2. Sweden (24); 3. Norway (19); 4. Germany (18); 5. Czechoslovakia (18); 6. Italy (10); 7. Poland (9)	Armando Castagna	9
1991	(Poland); Poznan; Olimpia Poznań Stadium	1. Denmark (28); 2. Sweden (24); 3. Norway (19); 4. Germany (18); 5. Czechoslovakia (18); 6. Italy (10); 7. Poland (9)	Valentino Furlanetto	1
1991	(Poland); Poznan; Olimpia Poznań Stadium	1. Denmark (28); 2. Sweden (24); 3. Norway (19); 4. Germany (18); 5. Czechoslovakia (18); 6. Italy (10); 7. Poland (9)	Fabrizio Vesprini	0
1992	(Italy); Lonigo; Santa Marina Stadium	1. United States (23); 2. England (23); 3. Sweden (22); 4. Italy (18); 5. Denmark (16); 6. New Zealand (14); 7. Australia (10)	Armando Castagna	16
1992	(Italy); Lonigo; Santa Marina Stadium	1. United States (23); 2. England (23); 3. Sweden (22); 4. Italy (18); 5. Denmark (16); 6. New Zealand (14); 7. Australia (10)	Valentino Furlanetto	2
1992	(Italy); Lonigo; Santa Marina Stadium	1. United States (23); 2. England (23); 3. Sweden (22); 4. Italy (18); 5. Denmark (16); 6. New Zealand (14); 7. Australia (10)	Armando Dal Chiele	0

== International caps (as of 2022) ==
Since the advent of the Speedway Grand Prix era, international caps earned by riders is largely restricted to international competitions, whereas previously test matches between two teams were a regular occurrence. This means that the number of caps earned by a rider has decreased in the modern era.

Rider	Caps
Alfonso, Stefano	7
Carpanese, Mattia	8
Castagna, Armando	43
Castgana, Paco	
Dal Chiele, Armando	43
Covatti, Nico	1
Famari, Gianni	24
Franchetti, Guglielmo	5
Furlanetto, Valentino	36
Maida, Andrea	
Marzotto, Giuseppe	15
Milanese, Alessandro	
Miotello, Christian	
Muratelli, Simone	
Righetto, Ottoviano	15
Salvatelli, Paolo	20
Sanchez, Emiliano	4
Terenzani, Simone	8
Tessari, Daniele	5
Vesprini, Fabrizio	
Vicentin, Nicolas

== See also ==
- motorcycle speedway
