= Michele Paco Castagna =

Italian speedway rider (born 1994)

- Born: 4 March 1994 (age 32); Arzignano, Italy
- Nationality: Italian

Career history

Great Britain
- 2015: Sheffield
- 2016: Ipswich
- 2019, 2021, 2025: Birmingham
- 2022–2025: Edinburgh

Denmark
- 2021: Nordjysk

Poland
- 2025: Landshut

Individual honours
- 2017, 2018, 2022, 2024: Italian Champion

Michele Paco Castagna (born 4 March 1994) is an Italian international speedway rider.

== Speedway career ==
Castagna is four times Italian Champion, winning the Italian Individual Speedway Championship in 2017, 2018, 2022 and 2024. He has also won the Italian Junior Championship three times (2011, 2012, 2014). He has ridden in the British Speedway leagues since 2015, riding for various clubs, including Ipswich Witches in 2016. In 2019 and 2021, he rode for the Birmingham Brummies.

In 2022, Castagna rode for the Edinburgh Monarchs in the SGB Championship 2022. He won his third Italian Individual Speedway Championship during 2022.

In 2023 and 2024, Castagna re-signed for the Monarchs for the SGB Championship 2023 and the SGB Championship 2024.

In 2025, Castagna was awarded Medaglia al valore atletico in his home province of Vicenza in recognition of his achievement in the 2024 Italian Individual Speedway Championship, where he completed the entire series completely unbeaten by an opponent. Castagna returned to race for Birmingham for the third time during the early part of the 2025 Premiership season.

== Results ==
=== World Championships ===
- Individual U-21 World Championship
  - 2012 – 31st – 2 pts
  - 2013 – 20th – 2 pts
  - 2015 – 17th – 4 pts

== Personal life ==
His father Armando Castagna was a professional speedway rider from 1985 to 2001 and was a 12 times national champion.
