= Slovakia national speedway team =

Slovak national motorcycle speedway team

Slovakia
- Nation colour: White, Blue and Red
- SWC wins: 0

The Slovakia national speedway team are one of the nations that compete in international motorcycle speedway.

== History ==
=== As Czechoslovakia ===
The Czechoslovakia speedway team (which consisted predominantly of Czech Republic riders) competed in the inaugural Speedway World Team Cup during the 1960 Speedway World Team Cup and won the bronze medal after finishing third in the final. Throughout the history of World Team Cup, the team were regular World Cup contenders from 1960 until their final World Cup in 1992. They reached the final on fourteen occasions, winning the silver medal in 1963 and two more bronze medals in 1977 and 1979. In addition to the four medals at the World Cup, the team won a bronze medal at the Speedway World Pairs Championship.

Following the Dissolution of Czechoslovakia at the end of 1992, the riders then competed for their new speedway nations of Slovakia and the Czech Republic.

=== As Slovakia ===
The Slovakia national speedway team first competed in the World Team Cup during the 1994 Speedway World Team Cup. They finished in 6th place in Group C (the third tier of the World Cup). However, as one of the minnows of World speedway, they have either failed to qualify or did not enter the competition or the Speedway of Nations since.

The team have competed in the European Pairs Speedway Championship since 2012, reaching the final in 2020 and saw Martin Vaculík finish third in the 2023 World individual championship.

== International caps ==
Since the advent of the Speedway Grand Prix era, international caps earned by riders is largely restricted to international competitions, whereas previously test matches between two teams were a regular occurrence. This means that the number of caps earned by a rider has decreased in the modern era.

Rider	Caps
Buri, Patrik	
Forgač, Gaspar	
Halabrin, Jan	
Meharik, Jan	
Pacalaj, David	
Vaculík, Martin	
Valkovic, Jakub	
Visvader, Vladimir	
