= Paul Thorp =

British motorcycle speedway rider

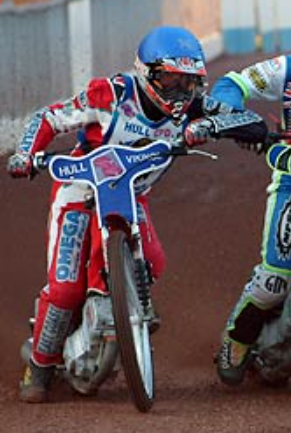
- Thorp riding for the Hull Vikings in 2005
- Born: 9 September 1964 (age 62); Macclesfield, England
- Nationality: British (English)

Career history
- 1980–1983: Birmingham Brummies
- 1981: Scunthorpe Scorpions
- 1981, 2006: Workington Comets
- 1982–1983: Berwick Bandits
- 1984–1985: Wolverhampton Wolves
- 1984–1986: Stoke Potters
- 1986–1988, 1997: Belle Vue Aces
- 1989–1992, 1994: Bradford Dukes
- 1993: Newcastle Diamonds
- 1995–1996, 1998–2005: Hull Vikings

Individual honours
- 1986: National League Riders Champion
- 1986: Second City Trophy

Team honours
- 1989: World Team Cup Winner
- 1991, 1992: Knockout Cup
- 1994: British League Premiership Winner
- 1990: British League Gold Cup Winner
- 1991: Inter League Cup Winner
- 2004: Premier League Champion
- 2001, 2004: Premier League KO Cup Winner
- 2000: Premier Trophy
- 2004: Young Shield Winner
- 2002: Premiership Winner

Paul Thorp (born 9 September 1964 in Macclesfield, Cheshire,) is a former motorcycle speedway rider from England. He earned 31 international caps for the England national speedway team.

== Career ==
Thorp began his racing career riding a few matches for Birmingham Brummies in the top league, during the 1980 British League season and would spend four seasons in total with the club but failed to make an impact with them. He did however make an impact with Berwick Bandits in the National League averaging 6.47 and 6.20 in his two seasons with the club.

In 1984 and 1985, Thorp doubled up with Wolverhampton Wolves and Stoke Potters but it was the 1986 season that propelled Thorp's career forward. He won the National League Riders' Championship, held on 30 August at Brandon Stadium and averaged 10.44 with Stoke (second in the league averages behind Dave Jessup). He also reached the first of his six British Speedway Championship finals.

From 1987 to 1988, Thorp rode for Belle Vue Aces before joining Bradford Dukes in 1989. He was selected by England for the 1989 Speedway World Team Cup and went on to win a gold medal for his country. He rode five seasons for Bradford with one season for Newcastle Diamonds splitting the spell. He won two consecutive Knockout Cups with Bradford in 1991 and 1992 and achieved his greatest individual feat when finishing sixth in the 1991 Individual Speedway World Championship.

Thorp continued to ride for many seasons, primarily for Hull Vikings and always maintained a strong average and won a league title, two knockout Cups and a Young Shield with them. His final season in 2006 with Workington Comets was his 27th year in speedway.

== World final appearances ==
=== Individual World Championship ===
- 1991 – (Sweden) Gothenburg, Ullevi – 6th – 10pts

=== World Team Cup ===
- 1989 – (England) Bradford, Odsal Stadium (with Jeremy Doncaster / Kelvin Tatum / Simon Wigg / Simon Cross) – Winner – 48pts (12)
