= Brian Karger =

Danish speedway rider

- Born: 9 February 1967 (age 59); Horsens, Denmark
- Nationality: Danish

Career history

Denmark
- 1989–1995, 2004: Fredericia
- 2000–2001: Slangerup
- 2002: Vojens
- 2003: Brovst

Great Britain
- 1986–1991, 1995–1997: Swindon Robins
- 1991–1993: Arena Essex Hammers
- 2000, 2002: Belle Vue Aces

Poland
- 1993–1997: ZKŻ Zielona Góra
- 1998: GKM Grudziądz
- 1999: Kolejarz Opole
- 2000: Polonia Piła
- 2001: ROW Rybnik
- 2003–2004: Wybrzeże Gdańsk

Sweden
- 1988–1991, 1994: Bysarna
- 1995–1998: Elit Vetlanda
- 1999–2002: Kaparna

Individual honours
- 1996, 1998, 2000,: Danish Champion
- 1995, 1998: Intercontinental Cup
- 1991: Southern Riders' Champion

Team honours
- 1991, 1995: Speedway World Team Cup winner
- 1991: Fours Championship winner
- 1988: Elitserien Champion

Brian Karger (born 9 February 1967) is a Danish former international motorcycle speedway rider.

== Career ==
Karger was a member of the Denmark speedway team when they won the 1991 and 1995 World Team Cup Finals. He also qualified for the 1992 World Final in Wrocław, Poland, where he finished 16th (last) with four points scored, including a win in his final race.

Karger rode in Sweden and won the Swedish Elitserien in 1988 with Bysarna.

Karger first rode in the United Kingdom for the Swindon Robins, after joining them late in the 1986 British League season. He later rode for Arena Essex Hammers and also for the Belle Vue Aces.

In 1991, Karger helped the Arena Essex Hammers win the Fours Championship during the 1991 British League Division Two season. Also in 1991, he won the Southern Riders' Championship.

After retiring, Karger became a notable engine tuner.

== World Final Appearances ==
=== Individual World Championship ===
- 1992 - (Poland) Wrocław, Olympic Stadium - 16th - 4pts

=== World Team Cup ===
- 1989 - (England) Bradford, Odsal Stadium - (with Hans Nielsen / Erik Gundersen / Gert Handberg / John Jørgensen) - 2nd - 34pts (7)

=== World Pairs ===
- 1993 - (Denmark) Vojens Speedway Center - (with Hans Nielsen / Tommy Knudsen) - 3rd - 21pts (1)

=== World team Championships ===
- 1989 Speedway World Team Cup - 2nd
- 1990 Speedway World Team Cup - 3rd
- 1991 Speedway World Team Cup - winner
- 1992 Speedway World Team Cup - 4th
- 1993 Speedway World Team Cup - 2nd
- 1995 Speedway World Team Cup - winner
- 1998 Speedway World Team Cup - 3rd
- 1999 Speedway World Team Cup - =5th
- 2000 Speedway World Team Cup - =5th
