= Armando Dal Chiele =

Italian speedway rider (born 1959)

- Born: 11 February 1959 (age 67); Lonigo, Italy
- Nationality: Italian

Career history

Great Britain
- 1982: Birmingham Brummies
- 1988-1991: King's Lynn Stars

Team honours
- 1984, 1989, 1992: World Pairs finalist

Armando Dal Chiele (born 11 February 1959) is an Italian former international speedway rider.

== Speedway career ==
In 1982, Dal Chiele joined Birmingham Brummies in the top tier of British Speedway for the 1982 British League season.

Dal Chiele reached the final of the Speedway World Pairs Championship three times from 1984 until 1992.

In 1988, Dal Chiele returned to the British leagues after joining King's Lynn Stars, where he rode for four years.

== World Final appearances ==
=== World Pairs Championship ===
- 1984 - (Italy) Lonigo, Santa Marina Stadium (with Armando Castagna) - 7th - 6pts
- 1989 - (Poland) Leszno, Alfred Smoczyk Stadium (with Valentino Furlanetto) - 8th - 15pts
- 1992 - (Italy) Lonigo, Santa Marina Stadium (with Valentino Furlanetto / Armando Castagna) - 4th - 18pts
