= Craig Boyce =

Australian speedway rider

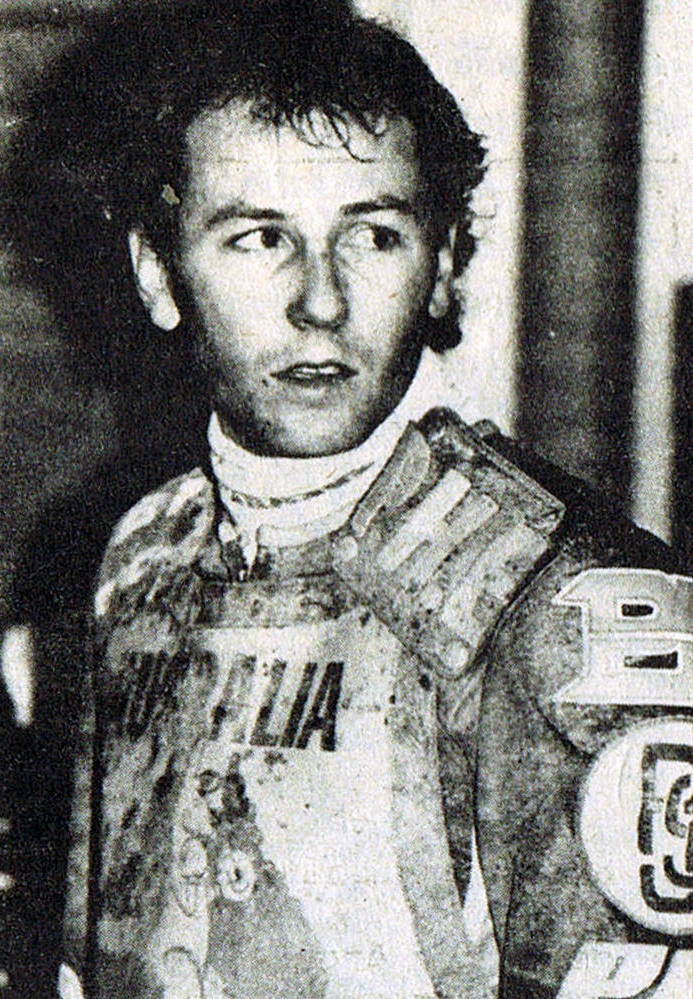
- Born: 2 August 1967 (age 59); Sydney, Australia
- Nationality: Australian

Career history

Great Britain
- 1988–1990, 1992–1994 1996–1998, 2006–2007: Poole Pirates
- 1991, 1999, 2003: Oxford Cheetahs
- 1995: Swindon Robins
- 2000: King's Lynn Stars
- 2001–2003: Ipswich Witches
- 2004–2005: Isle of Wight Islanders

Poland
- 1996: Rzeszów
- 1997: Leszno
- 2000: Gorzów
- 2001: Piła
- 2002: Warszawa

Sweden
- 1991–1992: Skepparna
- 1994, 1996–2004: Västervik

Individual honours
- 1991, 1993, 1994, 1995, 1997: NSW State Champion
- 1991, 1996, 1997: Australian Champion
- 1996: Australian Masters Series 500 Champion

Team honours
- 1989, 1990: National League Champion
- 1990: National League KO Cup Winner
- 1991: Australian Pairs Champion
- 1994: British League Champion
- 2001: World Cup Winner
- 2003: British League Cup Winner
- 2006: Craven Shield Winner

Craig Vincent Boyce (born 2 August 1967 in Sydney, Australia) is a former motorcycle speedway rider who primarily rode for the Poole Pirates in the British Elite League. After retiring from riding, Boyce became manager of the Australian national team until 2012.

Boyce is a three-time Australian Solo Champion. He won all of his championships (1991, 1996 and 1997) with a 15-point maximum.

== Career ==
=== Australia ===
Boyce started riding at the now defunct Liverpool Speedway in western Sydney during the mid-1980s and established himself as one of not only the most promising young riders from New South Wales, but in Australia, finishing third in the 1988 Australian Under-21 Championship. He won his first NSW State Championship at the Newcastle Motordrome with a 15-point maximum from defending champion and World #3 Todd Wiltshire on 26 December 1990, before going on to win the 1991 Australian Championship at the Arunga Park Speedway in Alice Springs, again with a 15-point maximum, defeating two-time defending champion Glenn Doyle of Western Australia. Boyce inflicted Doyle's only defeat of the night when the pair clashed in Heat 18 with each going into the race unbeaten. Boyce beat Doyle out of the gate and was never headed to win his first national championship while Dolye had to be content with second in both the race and on the night.

As reigning Australian Champion, Boyce was seeded to the 1992 Australian Championship at North Arm in Adelaide after he finished in third place in the NSW championship (under the old single meeting format, only the top-two from each state or territories title were automatic qualifiers for the Australian Championship). However, his lackluster form continued in Adelaide when he could only manage eighth place in defense of his Australian title, scoring 8 points with only one win on the night.

Boyce would win the NSW title another three times during his career (1993, 1994 and 1995) while also winning the Australian Championship twice more, in 1996 at the Motordrome, and 1997 at the Brisbane Exhibition Ground.

In 1996, Boyce won the ten round Australian Speedway Masters Series (also known as the "Series 500"), easily winning the series from Sam Ermolenko and defending champion Tony Rickardsson. He would finish second in the Masters Series to Leigh Adams in 1997.

=== UK, Poland and Sweden ===
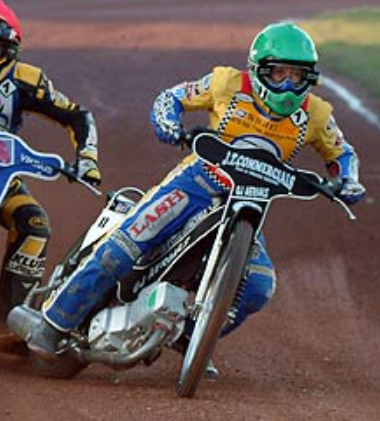
Boyce riding for Isle of Wight in 2005

Boyce made his debut for the Poole Pirates in 1988 and rode for the Pirates until 1990 before moving to the Oxford Cheetahs in 1991. He returned to Poole in 1992 and stayed until 1994 when he again moved, this time to the Swindon Robins. After being at Swindon for only a season he moved back to Poole in 1996 and stayed until 1998. In 1999, he re-signed with Oxford before moving to King's Lynn for 2000. Boyce was on the move again in 2001, this time to the Ipswich Witches where he stayed until 2003, following which he signed with the Isle of Wight Islanders for 2004 and 2005 before moving one last time, back to Poole for 2006 and 2007.

During his time in the United Kingdom, Boyce won the National League with Poole in 1989 and 1990 as well as the National League Knockout Cup in 1990. He also won the British League Championship in 1994 with Poole. Boyce also won the British League Cup with Poole in 2003.

While racing in the British leagues during his career, Boyce also rode for Västervik Speedway in the Swedish Elite League starting in 1991, also riding for the team in 1992, 1994 and from 1996 until his last year in Sweden in 2004. Boyce also rode in Poland for various teams during his career including Stal Rzeszów (1996), Unia Leszno (1997), Stal Gorzów Wielkopolski (2000), Polonia Piła (2001) and WKM Warszawa in his last year in Poland, 2002.

=== International ===
Boyce represented Australia in numerous Test Matches against teams such as Great Britain, England and Sweden as well as representing his home state of NSW against the first ever USSR team to tour Australia in 1990.

Boyce was also the captain of the Australian team that won the 2001 Speedway World Cup Final in Wrocław, Poland. Boyce scored 9 of Australia's 68 points to defeat host nation Poland with Sweden finishing in third. He also rode for Australia in the 1992 World Pairs Championship in Lonigo, Italy, finishing seventh (and last) with Leigh Adams and reserve Shane Parker and improving to sixth in 1993 as reserve to Adams and Jason Lyons. The Pairs Championship was merged with the World Team Cup from 1994 with Boyce once again reaching the final, finishing in fourth with Adams. Boyce was involved in a three rider a run-off to decide third, fourth and fifth places at the final with Tommy Knudsen of Denmark winning from Boyce and 1993 World Champion Sam Ermolenko of the USA. Boyce teamed with Adams and future World Champion Jason Crump to finish fifth for Australia in the 1995 World Team Cup Final before finishing fourth in 2000.

Boyce qualified for one World Championship Final during his career in 1994 at Vojens, Denmark where he finished in a surprise 3rd place behind Sweden's Tony Rickardsson and Denmark's Hans Nielsen. All three riders tied on 13 points for the Final and a run-off was needed to decide the podium places with Rickardsson winning the run-off from Neilsen and Boyce.

Boyce also rode in the Speedway Grand Prix series during his career. He finished 11th in 1995, 14th in 1996 with 30 points and 20th in 1998, which was his last year riding the series.

== Retirement ==
In November 2007, Boyce announced his retirement from racing and has since continued running his own speedway engine tuning company. He ended his career as the Poole's highest ever points scorer after amassing 4,490 points in all competitions for the Pirates.

== Other honours ==
- Poole Blue Riband Trophy 1997

== World Final Appearances ==
=== Individual World Championship ===
- 1994 - (Denmark) Vojens, Speedway Center - 3rd - 12+1pts

=== World Pairs Championship ===
- 1992 - (Italy) Lonigo, Pista Speedway (with Leigh Adams / Shane Parker) - 7th - 10pts (5)
- 1993 - (Denmark) Vojens, Speedway Center (with Leigh Adams / Jason Lyons) - 6th - 13pts (1)

=== World Team Cup ===
- 1994 - (Germany) Brokstedt Holsteinring (with Leigh Adams / Jason Crump) - 4th - 17pts (10)
- 1995 - (Poland) Bydgoszcz, Polonia Bydgoszcz Stadium (with Jason Crump / Leigh Adams) - 5th - 14pts (6)
- 2000 - (England) Coventry, Brandon Stadium (with Jason Crump / Todd Wiltshire / Leigh Adams / Ryan Sullivan) - 4th - 29pts (0)

=== World Cup ===
- 2001 - (Poland) Wrocław, Olympic Stadium (with Jason Crump / Todd Wiltshire / Ryan Sullivan / Leigh Adams) - Winner - 68pts (9)

== Speedway Grand Prix results ==
| Year | Position | Points | Best finish | Notes |
|---|---|---|---|---|
| 1995 | 11th | 60 | 6th | |
| 1996 | 14th | 30 | 7th | |
| 1998 | 20th | 18 | 16th | |
