= Svítkov Stadium =

Stadium in Pardubice, Czech Republic

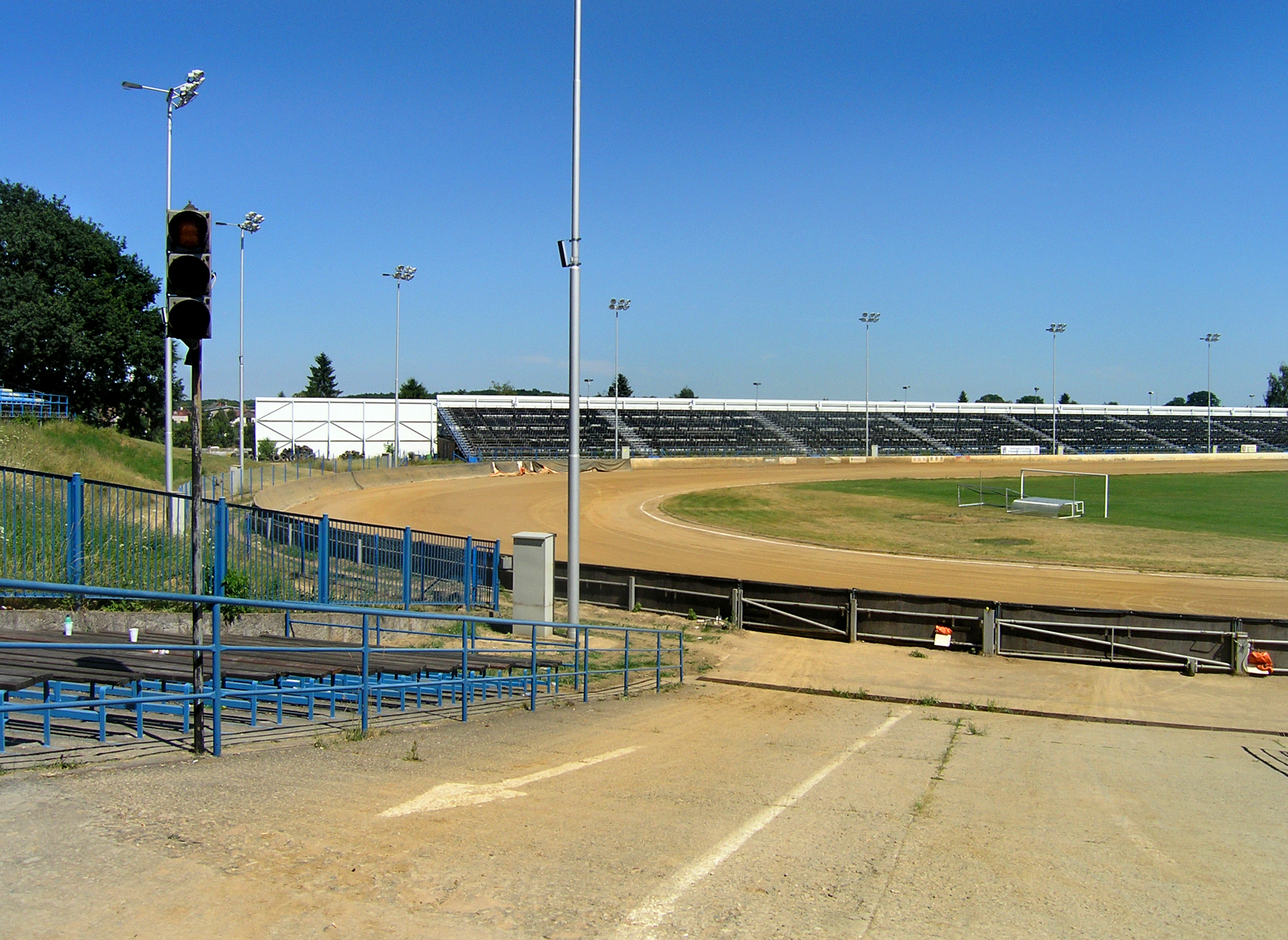
- Location: Motoristů 300, 530 06 Pardubice VI-Svítkov, Czech Republic
- Coordinates: 50°01′22″N 15°43′09″E
- Capacity: 10,000
- Opened: 1953/54
- Length: 0.4 km

The Svítkov Stadium (Czech: Plochodrážní stadion Svítkov) is a 10,000-capacity speedway stadium in the Svítkov area of Pardubice, Czech Republic. The stadium is located in the west of Svítkov, which itself is located on the western outskirts of the city. The speedway track has a circumference of 400 metres and is home to the speedway team AMK Zlatá Přilba Pardubice.

== History ==
The stadium was built in 1953 and 1954. Since 1964, the stadium has hosted the prestigious Golden Helmet of Pardubice. It moved to Svítkov after previously being held at the Velká pardubická from 1929 to 1963. The wide bends of the track allow six riders to compete in the competition.

In addition to the Golden Helmet competition, the stadium has hosted significant major world championship events such as 1987 Speedway World Pairs Championship, the 1990 Speedway World Team Cup final and the 1993 Speedway Under-21 World Championship and 2008 Speedway Under-21 World Championship finals.

Since 2009, the stadium has continued to host major events including finals of the Team Speedway Under-21 World Championship and the Speedway Under-21 World Championship.

In 2022 and 2023, the Individual Speedway European Championship final was held on the track. The stadium will host the final of the Speedway Grand Prix Challenge on 4 October 2024.
