= Andreas Bössner =

Austrian speedway rider (born 1968)

Andreas Bossner
- Born: 19 August 1968 (age 58); Vienna, Austria
- Nationality: German

Career history

Great Britain
- 1994: Exeter Falcons

Individual honours
- 1991, 1992 1993, 1996 1997, 1998: Austrian Champion

Andreas Bössner (born 19 August 1968) is an Austrian former motorcycle speedway rider. He earned 20 caps for the Austria national speedway team.

== Career ==
In 1987, Bössner represented the Austria national speedway team during the 1987 Speedway World Team Cup. He continued to participate in multiple World Cups and would go on to ride for Austria 20 times in total.

Bössner became a multiple Austrian national champion after winning the Austrian Individual Speedway Championship for three consecutive years. The wins came in 1991, 1992, and 1993.

Bössner made his British leagues debut during the 1994 British League Division Two season, where he rode for Exeter Falcons. Bössner then won three more Austrian national titles in 1996, 1997 and 1998, to bring his total to six wins and set a record for the most wins at the time.
