= Valentino Furlanetto =

Italian speedway rider (born 1965)

- Born: 11 May 1965 (age 61); Lonigo, Italy
- Nationality: Italian

Career history

Great Britain
- 1988: Sheffield Tigers

Individual honours
- 1987, 1989: Italian champion

Team honours
- 1986, 1987, 1988, 1989, 1991, 1992: Speedway World Pairs Championship finalist

Valentino Furlanetto (born 11 May 1965) is a former international speedway rider from Italy.

== Speedway career ==
Furlanetto reached the final of the Speedway World Pairs Championship six times from 1986 until 1992.

Furlanetto rode in the top tier of British Speedway in 1988, riding for Sheffield Tigers He was the 1987 and 1989 Italian champion. but struggled to impress and lost his place in the Sheffield team in June.

== World Final appearances ==
=== World Pairs Championship ===
- 1986 - (West Germany) Pocking, Rottalstadion (with Armando Castagna) - 8th - 15pts (8)
- 1987 - (Czechoslovakia) Pardubice, Svítkov Stadion (with Armando Castagna) - 8th - 18pts (7)
- 1988 - (England) Bradford, Odsal Stadium (with Armando Castagna) - 7th - 21pts
- 1989 - (Poland) Leszno, Alfred Smoczyk Stadium (with Armando Dal Chiele) - 8th - 15pts
- 1991 - (Poland) Poznań, Olimpia Poznań Stadium (with Armando Castagna / Fabrizio Vesprini) - 6th - 10pts
- 1992 - (Italy) Lonigo, Pista Speedway (with Armando Castagna / Armando Dal Chiele) - 4th - 18pts

=== Ice World Championship ===
- 1984 (Soviet Union) Moscow, 16th
