= Andrea Maida =

Italian speedway rider (born 1964)

- Born: 23 March 1964 (age 62); Loreo (Rovigo)
- Nickname: Straky
- Nationality: Italian

Career history

Italy
- 1994: Terenzano

Individual honours
- 1996, 1997, 1999, 2002, 2003: Italian National Champion

Andrea Maida (born 23 March 1964 in Loreo, Rovigo Italy) is an Italian former motorcycle speedway rider, who was a member of Italy's national team.

== Career ==
As a child prior to his speedway career, Maida started practicing skating achieving several wins in provincial and regional championships. Looking for more excitement, he devotes himself to karate gaining a brilliant third place in the Italian championship. The love for bikes without brakes begins back in 1973 when he was nine years old, and he has his first encounter with this particular motoring.

Maida finished third in the 1994 Italian Individual Speedway Championship behind Armando Castagna before going on to become a five times champions of Italy.

Maida competed in both the World Team Cup and individual World Championship at the Continental Speedway final stage.

== Results ==
- Team World Championship (Speedway World Team Cup and Speedway World Cup)
  - 1994 - 4th place in Group A
  - 1999 - 2nd place in Quarter-Final A
  - 2000 - 4th place in Semi-Final B
  - 2001 - 3rd place in Preliminary round 1
  - 2003 - 11th place
  - 2004 - 7th place
  - 2007 - 3rd place in Qualifying round 2
  - 2008 - 4th place in Qualifying round 2
- Individual European Championship
  - 2003 - (Czech Republic) Slaný - 16th place (1 pt)
- European Pairs Championship
  - 2004 - 6th place in Semi-Final 1
  - 2005 - (Poland) Gdańsk - 6th place (3 pts)
  - 2007 - (Italy) Terenzano - 7th place (10 pts)
- European Club Champions' Cup
  - 1999 - qualify to Group A
  - 2007 - 2nd place in Semi-Final 1

== See also ==
- Italy national speedway team
