= Vesa Ylinen =

Finnish speedway rider

- Born: 23 July 1965 (age 61); Seinäjoki, Finland
- Nationality: Finnish

Career history

Great Britain
- 1993–1994, 1996: Edinburgh Monarchs

Poland
- 1991: Torun

Sweden
- 1988–1991: Griparna
- 1992–1993: Rospiggarna
- 1995: Smederna

Individual honours
- 1991, 1992, 1995 1996, 1998: Finnish national Champion

Vesa Ylinen (born 23 July 1965) is a Finnish former motorcycle speedway rider. He earned 14 caps for the Finland national speedway team.

== Career ==
In 1991, Ylinen became the national champion of Finland after winning the Finnish Individual Speedway Championship and the following year he successfully defended his title by winning it again. He toured the UK with Rospiggarna in 1992.

Ylinen came to the attention of the Edinburgh Monarchs who signed him for the 1993 British League season, where he would stay for two seasons. A third and fourth Finnish national title was secured in 1995 and 1996 respectively and he would return to the Edinburgh club in 1996, when they were called the Scottish Monarchs.

Ylinen won a fifth and final national title in 1998 and then returned to his native Finland to complete his career with Kotkat Seinajoki.

== See also ==
- Finland national speedway team
