= Stefano Alfonso =

Italian speedway rider

- Born: 10 January 1968 (age 58); Este, Italy
- Nationality: Italian

Career history

Great Britain
- 1996: Scottish Monarchs
- 1998: Edinburgh Monarchs

Individual honours
- 1995: Continental Final silver
- 1996: Italian Grand Prix (11th)
- 1998: Italian National Champion

Stefano Alfonso (born 10 January 1968 in Este, Italy) was a speedway rider who raced for the Scottish Monarchs and Edinburgh Monarchs in the United Kingdom.

== Career Summary ==
After starting out as a MotoCross rider, Alfonso switched to speedway in 1992 at the age of 24.

In 1995, Alfonso finished second in both the Continental semi-final in Lonigo and the Continental Speedway final in Miskolc before finishing 15th out of 16 in the Grand Prix Challenge in Lonigo.

These performances were enough to get Alfonso noticed by British League clubs and he signed for the Scottish Monarchs for the 1996 season.

The highlight of Alfonso's career came during the 1996 season when he competed in the 1996 Italian Grand Prix, a meeting where he defeated the eventual 1996 World Champion, Billy Hamill.

An arm injury in June interrupted his British League season in 1996, and Alfonso only made a few more appearances before the end of the season. Alfonso didn't return to the UK in 1997 after being banned from racing due to failing a drugs test at the Italian Championships in 1996.

In 1998, Alfosno became the national champions of Italy. After competing on the Continent during 1998, Alfonso returned to the UK with Edinburgh Monarchs near the end of the season. However, he didn't make the expected impact while competing on sub-standard, borrowed machinery and failed to return to the Monarchs after a return home for an Italian Championship meeting. His failure to complete the necessary six matches to gain a new league average saw him excluded from the 1999 team and he never raced in UK speedway again.

Alfonso continued to compete on the Continent, including racing in the Italian League in 2002, before a broken leg ended his career.

== See also ==
- Italy national speedway team
- List of Speedway Grand Prix riders
