= Santa Marina Stadium =

Stadium in Lonigo, Italy

- Location: 36045 Lonigo, Province of Vicenza, Italy
- Coordinates: 45°22′32″N 11°23′34″E
- Capacity: 5,000
- Owner: Moto Club Lonigo
- Opened: 12 June 1977
- Length: 0.334 km

The Santa Marina Stadium is a 5,000-capacity motorcycle stadium in the Lonigo, Italy. The stadium is situated in the southern part of Lonigo, which itself is 25km south of Vicenza. The stadium is affiliated to the Federazione Motociclistica Italiana and has a circumference of 334 metres.

== History ==
The Moto Club Lonigo had previously raced speedway at the Hippodrome Municipal Park from 1947 to 1972 before moving to a new site in nearby Monticello di Fara, Sarego. The track known as La Favorita, off the Via Julia Divisione, was only a temporary solution for the club because they wanted a facility that would meet international regulations. Work began on the Santa Marina Stadium and it opened on the on 12 June 1977, hosting the semi-finals of the 1977 Speedway World Pairs Championship. Although the Moto Club Lonigo moved to the new stadium in 1977, a new motorcycle club called MotoClub La Favorita Sarego was formed and they continued to race at La Favorita until 1982, when it was converted into a football facility for ASD La Favorita 93.

The Santa Marina stadium became the home of the World Championship round, known as the Speedway Grand Prix of Italy in 1996 and from 2005 to 2008. In addition it has hosted numerous major speedway events, including World and European qualifiers and the Italian Individual Speedway Championship.

In 2021, renovation costing in excess 280,000 euros took place in order to bring the stadium into line with regulatory adaptation that also allowed the venue to be used by other parties and not exclusively speedway and it also set a new capacity of 5,000 instead of 8,000.

== See also ==
- Speedway Grand Prix of Italy
