= Armando Castagna =

Italian speedway rider

- Born: 22 September 1963 (age 63); Arzignano, Italy
- Nationality: Italian

Career history

Great Britain
- 1985: Kings Lynn Stars
- 1988: Ipswich Witches
- 1989, 1990, 1992-1994 1996, 2000, 2001: Reading Racers
- 1991: Eastbourne Eagles
- 1995: Oxford Cheetahs
- 1997: Poole Pirates

Poland
- 1998: Lublin
- 1999: Rawicz
- 1991: Ostrów

Individual honours
- 1984, 1985, 1986 1988, 1990, 1991 1992, 1993 1994 1995 2000, 2001: Italian Champion
- 1997: Continental Champion
- 1999: Argentinian Champion
- 1990: Italian Grasstrack Championship

Team honours
- 1990, 1992: British League Champion
- 1993: Fours
- 1991: West German Championship
- 1993, 1994, 2001: Italian Championship

Armando Castagna (born 22 September 1963) is a former Italian international motorcycle speedway rider. He was a member of the Italy national team and has represented them in several World Team Cup competitions. He is a record 12 times Italian Champion.

== Career ==
Castagna was born in Arzignano and rode in the United Kingdom for the Ipswich Witches and Oxford Cheetahs but he spent the majority of his career with the Reading Racers where he won the British League title twice and was part of the Reading team that won the Fours championship in 1993.

Castagna rode in the first of his five world finals in 1985.

Castagna has ridden in the Speedway Grand Prix series and has reached five Speedway World Championship finals. On 26 July 1997, he won the Continental Final, which formed part of the 1998 Speedway Grand Prix Qualification.

Castagna won the Italian National Championship a record twelve times and in 1999, he won the Argentine Championship.

== World final appearances ==
=== Individual World Championship ===
- 1985 - (England) Bradford, Odsal Stadium - 13th - 4pts
- 1986 - (Poland) Chorzów, Silesian Stadium - 14th - 2pts
- 1990 - (England) Bradford, Odsal Stadium - 8th - 8pts
- 1991 - (Sweden) Gothenburg, Ullevi - 11th - 6pts
- 1993 - (Germany) Pocking, Rottalstadion - 12th - 5pts

=== World Pairs Championship ===
- 1984 - (Italy) Lonigo, Pista Speedway (with Armando Dal Chiele) - 7th - 6pts (5)
- 1986 - (West Germany) Pocking, Rottalstadion (with Valentino Furlanetto) - 8th - 15pts (7)
- 1987 - (Czechoslovakia) Pardubice, Svítkov Stadion (with Valentino Furlanetto) - 8th - 18pts (11)
- 1988 - (England) Bradford, Odsal Stadium (with Valentino Furlanetto) - 7th - 21pts
- 1991 - (Poland) Poznań, Olimpia Poznań Stadium (with Valentino Furlanetto / Fabrizio Vesprini) - 6th - 10pts
- 1992 - (Italy) Lonigo, Pista Speedway (with Valentino Furlanetto / Armando Dal Chiele) - 4th - 18pts

== Retirement ==
Since retiring in 2001, Castagna took charge of speedway in Italy and was the Italy national team manager.

At its meeting on Friday 22 February 2013, the FIM Board of Directors appointed new Directors and new members in various Commissions. Castagna was appointed as new Director of the FIM Track Racing Commission (CCP), succeeding Roy Otto.

== Family ==
Castagna's son Michele Paco is a speedway rider and Italian champion.
