= 2013 European Pairs Speedway Championship =

Motorcycle racing competition

Seasons
- ← 2012 2014 →

The 2013 European Pairs Speedway Championship was the tenth edition of the European Pairs Speedway Championship. The final was held at the Sandbahn Rennen Herxheim in Herxheim, Germany on 29 June. Germany won their first title.

== Calendar ==
| Day | Venue | Winner | |
Semi-final
| 27 April | (Hungary) Borsod Volán Stadion, Miskolc | Poland | result |
Final
| 29 June | (Germany) Sandbahn Rennen Herxheim, Herxheim | Germany | result |

== Rules ==
- Semi-Final: 3 pairs will qualify to the Final
- The pairs of Ukraine, Latvia and Denmark were allocated to the Final after finishing in the top three in 2012. The pair of Germany was allocated to the Final as hosts.

== Semi-final ==
- (Hungary) Miskolc
- April 27

| Placing | Pair / Rider Name | Total | 1 | 2 | 3 | 4 | 5 | 6 | 7 | 8 | 9 | 10 | 11 | 12 | 13 | 14 | 15 | 16 | 17 | 18 | 19 | 20 | 21 | 22 |
| 1 | Poland | 25 | | | | | | | 9 | | | | | | | 15 | | | | | | | 25 |
| 1 | (11) Mariusz Puszakowski | 8 | | | 1 | | | | 2 | | | | 1 | | 0 | | | 2 | | | | | 2 |
| 1 | (12) Sebastian Ułamek | 17 | | | 3 | | | | 3 | | | | 3 | | 2 | | | 3 | | | | | 3 |
| 2 | Czech Republic | 23 | | | | | | | 5 | | | | | | | 15 | | | | | | | 23 |
| 2 | (9) Václav Milík, Jr. | 9 | | | 2 | | | 0 | | | | 2 | | 2 | | | 1 | | | | | 2 |
| 2 | (10) Josef Franc | 14 | | | 0 | | | 3 | | | | 3 | | 3 | | | 2 | | | | | 3 |
| 3 | Slovenia | 21 | | | | | | | 10 | | | | | | | 17 | | | | | | | 21 |
| 3 | (7) Matic Voldrih | 6 | | 2 | | | | 2 | | | 1 | | | | | 1 | | | | 0 | | | 0 |
| 3 | (8) Aleksander Čonda | 15 | | 3 | | | | 3 | | | 2 | | | | | 3 | | | | 3 | | | 1 |
| 4 | Italy | 15 | | | | | | | 5 | | | | | | | 8 | | | | | | | 15 |
| 4 | (1) Guglielmo Franchetti | 4 | 1 | | | 1 | | | | 0 | | | 0 | | | | 1 | | | 1 |
| 4 | (2) Nicolas Covatti | 11 | 3 | | | 0 | | | | 2 | | | 1 | | | | 3 | | | 2 |
| 5 | Hungary | 13 | | | | | | | 5 | | | | | | | 11 | | | | | | | 13 |
| 5 | (3) Norbert Magosi | 3 | 2 | | | | 1 | | | | 0 | | | | | | | | | | 0 |
| 5 | (4) Jozsef Tabaka | 7 | 0 | | | | 2 | | | | 3 | | | 0 | | | | 1 | | | 1 |
| 5 | (16) Roland Benko | 3 | | | | | | | | | | | | 3 | | | | 0 |
| 6 | Austria | 11 | | | | | | | 2 | | | | | | | 6 | | | | | | | 11 |
| 6 | (5) Daniel Gappmaier | 4 | | 0 | | | 0 | | | 1 | | | | | 1 | | | | 2 | | | 0 |
| 6 | (6) Lukas Simon | 7 | | 1 | | | 1 | | | 0 | | | | | 2 | | | | 0 | | | 3 |
| Placing | Pair / Rider Name | Total | 1 | 2 | 3 | 4 | 5 | 6 | 7 | 8 | 9 | 10 | 11 | 12 | 13 | 14 | 15 | 16 | 17 | 18 | 19 | 20 | 21 | 22 |

m - exclusion for exceeding two minute time allowance • t - exclusion for touching the tapes • x - other exclusion • e - retired or mechanical failure • f - fell
ns - non-starter • nc - non-classify

| gate A - inside | gate B | gate C | gate D - outside |

== Final ==
- (Germany) Herxheim
- June 29

| Placing | Pair / Rider Name | Total | 1 | 2 | 3 | 4 | 5 | 6 | 7 | 8 | 9 | 10 | 11 | 12 | 13 | 14 | 15 | 16 | 17 | 18 | 19 | 20 | 21 | 22 |
| 1 | Germany | 26 | | | | | | | 10 | | | | | | | 17 | | | | | | | 26 |
| 1 | (1) Martin Smolinski | 16 | 3 | | | 3 | | | | 2 | | | 3 | | | | 3 | | | 2 |
| 1 | (2) Kevin Wölbert | 10 | 2 | | | 2 | | | | 1 | | | 1 | | | | 1 | | | 3 |
| 1 | (15) Max Dilger | 0 |
| 2 | Poland | 23 | | | | | | | 8 | | | | | | | 18 | | | | | | | 23 |
| 2 | (7) Sebastian Ułamek | 14 | | 1 | | | | 3 | | | 3 | | | | | 3 | | | | 1 | | | 3 |
| 2 | (8) Norbert Kościuch | 9 | | 2 | | | | 2 | | | 2 | | | | | 2 | | | | 0 | | | 1 |
| 2 | (18) Mariusz Puszakowski | 0 |
| 3 | Ukraine | 20 +3 | | | | | | | 6 | | | | | | | 12 | | | | | | | 20 |
| 3 | (5) Andriy Karpov | 18 | | 3 | | | 3 | | | 3 | | | | | 3 | | | | 3 | | | 3 | | 3 |
| 3 | (6) Oleksandr Loktaev | 0 | | 0 | | | 0 |
| 3 | (17) Stanislav Melnichuk | 2 | | | | | | | | 0 | | | | | 0 | | | | 1 | | | 1 |
| 4 | Latvia | 20 +2 | | | | | | | 8 | | | | | | | 13 | | | | | | | 20 |
| 4 | (11) Maksims Bogdanovs | 11 | | | 3 | | | | 2 | | | | 2 | | 1 | | | 3 | | | | | 0 |
| 4 | (12) Ķasts Puodžuks | 9 | | | 0 | | | | 3 | | | | 0 | | 2 | | | 2 | | | | | 2 | 2 |
| 5 | Denmark | 13 | | | | | | | 2 | | | | | | | 7 | | | | | | | 13 |
| 5 | (13) Rasmus Jensen | 10 | | | | 1 | | | 1 | | | 3 | | | | 0 | | | 2 | | 3 |
| 5 | (14) Kenni Nissen | 3 | | | | 0 | | | 0 | | | 1 | | | | 1 | | | 0 | | 1 |
| 6 | Czech Republic | 12 | | | | | | | 3 | | | | | | | 8 | | | | | | | 12 |
| 6 | (9) Zdeněk Simota | 7 | | | 1 | | | 0 | | | | 2 | | 2 | | | 0 | | | | | 2 |
| 6 | (10) Josef Franc | 2 | | | 2 | | | 0 |
| 6 | (19) Zdeněk Holub | 3 | | | | | | | | | | 1 | | 0 | | | 0 | | | | | 2 |
| 7 | Slovenia | 11 | | | | | | | 3 | | | | | | | 8 | | | | | | | 11 |
| 7 | (3) Matic Voldrih | 5 | 0 | | | | 0 | | | | 1 | | | 1 | | | | 1 | | | 2 |
| 7 | (4) Aleksander Čonda | 6 | 1 | | | | 2 | | | | 0 | | | 3 | | | | 0 | | | 0 |
| 7 | (16) Jernej Pečnik | 0 |
| Placing | Pair / Rider Name | Total | 1 | 2 | 3 | 4 | 5 | 6 | 7 | 8 | 9 | 10 | 11 | 12 | 13 | 14 | 15 | 16 | 17 | 18 | 19 | 20 | 21 | 22 |

m - exclusion for exceeding two minute time allowance • t - exclusion for touching the tapes • x - other exclusion • e - retired or mechanical failure • f - fell
ns - non-starter • nc - non-classify

| gate A - inside | gate B | gate C | gate D - outside |

== See also ==
- 2013 Speedway European Championship
