= 2011 European Pairs Speedway Championship =

European motorcycle speedway event

Seasons
- ← 2010 2012 →

The 2011 European Pairs Speedway Championship was the eighth edition of the European Pairs Speedway Championship. The final was held at the Stadion Polonii Piła in Piła, Poland on 17 September. Poland won their fourth title.

== Calendar ==
Day	Venue	Winner	
Semi-finals
27 August	(Hungary) Borsod Volán Stadion, Miskolc	Russia	result
27 August	(Germany) Motorrad Grasbahn, Berghaupten	Latvia	result
Final
20 September	(Poland) Stadion Polonii Piła, Pila	Poland	result

== Rules ==
- Semi-Final 1: 3 pairs will qualify to the Final
- Semi-Final 2: 3 pairs will qualify to the Final
- The pair of Poland team will be allocated to the Final

== Semifinal 1 ==
- (Hungary) Miskolc
- July 14

Placing	Pair / Rider Name	Total	1	2	3	4	5	6	7	8	9	10	11	12	13	14	15	16	17	18	19	20	21	22
1	Russia	27							8							17							27
1	(11) Aleksey Kharchenko	10			1				1				2		1			2					3
1	(12) Viktor Golubovsky	0			-				-				-		-			-					-
1	(20) Renat Gafurov	17			3				3				3		3			3					2
2	Denmark	26							7							16							26
2	(13) Kenneth Hansen	17				3			2			3				3			3		3
2	(14) Steen Jensen	9				2			0			1				2			2		2
2	(21) -	0
3	Hungary	23							7							13							23
3	(9) József Tabaka	2			E			2				E		-			-					-
3	(10) Norbert Magosi	14			2			3				2		1			3					3
3	(19) Laszlo Szatmari	7												3			2					2
4	Slovenia	16							7							14							16
4	(5) Aleš Kraljič	0		F			-			-					-				-			-
4	(6) Samo Kukovica	8		2			3			3					E				0			0
4	(16) Aleksander Čonda	8					2				2			2				1			1
5	Austria	13							5							11							13
5	(3) Fritz Wallner	10	3				1				3			2				F			1
5	(4) Daniel Gappmaier	3	1				0				1			0				1			0
5	(16) -	0
6	Ukraine	10							4							7							10
6	(7) Andriy Karpov	0		F				-			-					-				-			-
6	(8) Kirill Tsukanov	10		3				1			2					1				2			1
6	(18) -	0
7	Croatia	9							3							5							9
7	(1) Jasmin Ilias	7	2			0				0			1				1			3
7	(2) Renato Cvetko	2	0			1				1			0				F			E
7	(15) -	0
Placing	Pair / Rider Name	Total	1	2	3	4	5	6	7	8	9	10	11	12	13	14	15	16	17	18	19	20	21	22

m - exclusion for exceeding two minute time allowance • t - exclusion for touching the tapes • x - other exclusion • e - retired or mechanical failure • f - fell
ns - non-starter • nc - non-classify

gate A - inside	gate B	gate C	gate D - outside

== Semifinal 2 ==
- (Germany) Berghaupten
- July 14

Placing	Pair / Rider Name	Total	1	2	3	4	5	6	7	8	9	10	11	12	13	14	15	16	17	18	19	20	21	22
1	Latvia	25							8							18							25
1	(11) Andžejs Ļebedevs	12			0				2				2		2			3					3
1	(12) Ķasts Puodžuks	13			3				3				3		3			1					0
1	(20) -	0
2	Czech Republic	24							10							16							24
2	(7) Matej Kuš	13		3				3			2					1				3			1
2	(8) Filip Sitera	11		2				2			3					E				2			2
2	(18) Zdeněk Simota	0
3	Germany	21							7							17							21
3	(9) Max Dilger	9			2			3				2		2			E					E
3	(10) Christian Hefenbrock	12			1			1				3		3			1					3
3	(19) Kai Huckenbeck	0
4	(United Kingdom) Great Britain	14							5							9							14
4	(3) Kyle Newman	13	3				2				1			3				2			2
4	(4) Ashley Morris	1	0				0				0			F				0			1
4	(16) -	0
5	Denmark B	14							2							6							14
5	(5) Jonas B. Andersen	9		1			1			1					2				1			3
5	(6) Nikolaj Busk Jakobsen	5		E			0			E					1				2			2
5	(17) -	0
6	Italy	11							4							5							11
6	(1) Michele Castagna	3	2			0				-			0				-			1
6	(2) Christian Carrica	4	1			-				E			1				0			2
6	(15) Nicolas Vicentin -	4				1				F							3
Placing	Pair / Rider Name	Total	1	2	3	4	5	6	7	8	9	10	11	12	13	14	15	16	17	18	19	20	21	22

m - exclusion for exceeding two minute time allowance • t - exclusion for touching the tapes • x - other exclusion • e - retired or mechanical failure • f - fell
ns - non-starter • nc - non-classify

gate A - inside	gate B	gate C	gate D - outside

== Final ==
- (Poland) Pila
- September 17

Placing	Pair / Rider Name	Total	1	2	3	4	5	6	7	8	9	10	11	12	13	14	15	16	17	18	19	20	21	22
1	Poland	26							8							16							26
1	(3) Jaroslaw Hampel	9	1				1				-			2				3			2
1	(4) Przemyslaw Pawlicki	16	3				3				2			3				2			3
1	(16) Piotr Pawlicki Jr.	1									1
2	Hungary	20 +3							10							16							20
2	(13) Norbert Magosi	12				3			2			2				1			3		1			3
2	(14) Jozsef Tabaka	8				2			3			1				2			0		F
2	(21) -	0
3	Russia	20 +2							7							13							20
3	(7) Renat Gafurov	11		3				1			3					E				2			2
3	(8) Viktor Golubovsky	9		1				2			0					3				0			3	2
3	(18) -	0
4	Latvia	18							4							11							18
4	(5) Ķasts Puodžuks	6		2			0			1					1				1			1
4	(6) Andžejs Ļebedevs	12		0			2			3					2				2			3
4	(17) -	0
5	Denmark	17							3							8							17
5	(1) Steen Jensen	9	2			0				0			3				3			1
5	(2) Kenneth Hansen	8	0			1				2			0				2			3
5	(15) -	0
6	Czech Republic	14							7							11							14
6	(9) Vaclav Milik	0			-			-				-		0			0					-
6	(10) Filip Sitera	1			1			E				0		-			-					0
6	(19) Ales Dryml, Jr.	13			3			3				3		1			1					2
7	Germany	11							3							9							11
7	(11) Max Dilger	7			2				E				2		3			E					-
7	(12) Tobias Kroner	1			0				1				-		-			-					0
7	(20) Mathias Schultz	3											1		0			1					1
Placing	Pair / Rider Name	Total	1	2	3	4	5	6	7	8	9	10	11	12	13	14	15	16	17	18	19	20	21	22

m - exclusion for exceeding two minute time allowance • t - exclusion for touching the tapes • x - other exclusion • e - retired or mechanical failure • f - fell
ns - non-starter • nc - non-classify

gate A - inside	gate B	gate C	gate D - outside

== See also ==
- 2011 Individual Speedway European Championship
