= 2012 European Pairs Speedway Championship =

Motorcycle race

Seasons
- ← 2011 2013 →

The 2012 European Pairs Speedway Championship was the ninth edition of the European Pairs Speedway Championship. The final was held in Rivne Speedway Stadium, Rivne, Ukraine on 22 September. Ukraine won their first title.

== Calendar ==
Day	Venue	Winner	
Semi-finals
25 August	(Denmark) Munkebo Speedway Center, Munkebo	Denmark	result
8 September	(Hungary) Borsod Volán Stadion, Miskolc	Latvia	result
Final
22 September	(Ukraine) Rivne Speedway Stadium, Rivne	Ukraine	result

== Rules ==
- Semi-Final 1: 3 pairs will qualify to the Final
- Semi-Final 2: 3 pairs will qualify to the Final
- The pair of Ukraine team will be allocated to the Final

== Semifinal 1 ==
- (Denmark) Munkebo Speedway Center, Munkebo
- August 25

Placing	Pair / Rider Name	Total	1	2	3	4	5	6	7	8	9	10	11	12	13	14	15	16	17	18	19	20	21	22
1	Denmark	28							8							18							28
1	(5) Kenni Larsen	14		2			3			2					2				2			3
1	(6) Peter Kildemand	14		3			0			3					3				3			2
1	(17) Nikolaj Jacobsen	0
2	Germany	22							7							16							22
2	(11) Max Dilger	9			1				2				2		1			2					1
2	(12) Christian Hefenbrock	13			3				1				3		3			3					0
2	(20) -	0
3	Poland	20							6							10							20
3	(9) Daniel Jeleniewski	1			F			1				0		0			-					-
3	(10) Mariusz Puszakowski	14			2			3				1		3			3					2
3	(19) Szymon Kielbasa	5															2					3
4	Russia	13							7							11							13
4	(1) Denis Sayfutdinov	3	1			-				-			1				1			-
4	(2) Simon Vlasov	6	3			3				0			-				E			0
4	(15) Viktor Golubovsky	4				0				1			2							1
5	Denmark B	15							4							11							15
5	(7) Kenni Nissen	2		0				2			-					0				-			-
5	(8) Tommy Pedersen	5		1				1			2					-				0			1
5	(18) Emil Grøndal	8									3					2				1			2
6	Slovenia	10							4							6							10
6	(3) Maks Gregoric	6	0				2				F			0				1			3
6	(4) Matic Voldrih	4	2				0				1			1				F			0
6	(16) Jernej Pecnik	0
Placing	Pair / Rider Name	Total	1	2	3	4	5	6	7	8	9	10	11	12	13	14	15	16	17	18	19	20	21	22

m - exclusion for exceeding two minute time allowance • t - exclusion for touching the tapes • x - other exclusion • e - retired or mechanical failure • f - fell
ns - non-starter • nc - non-classify

gate A - inside	gate B	gate C	gate D - outside

== Semifinal 2 ==
- (Hungary) Borsod Volán Stadion, Miskolc
- September 8

Placing	Pair / Rider Name	Total	1	2	3	4	5	6	7	8	9	10	11	12	13	14	15	16	17	18	19	20	21	22
1	Latvia	28							10							20							28
1	(1) Andzej Lebedevs	13	3			2				3			2				2			1
1	(2) Kjasts Puodzuks	15	2			3				2			3				3			2
1	(15) -	0
2	Czech Republic	27							9							19							27
2	(7) Tomas Suchanek	15		1				3			3					3				3			2
2	(8) Vaclav Milik	12		3				2			2					2				0			3
2	(18) -	0
3	Hungary	23							7							13							23
3	(5) Laszlo Szatmari	11		2			2			0					2				2			3
3	(6) Norbert Magosi	12		0			3			1					3				3			2
3	(17) Sandor Tihanyi	0
4	Austria	18							2							8							18
4	(3) Johannes Fiala	6	F				0				0			2				2			2
4	(4) Daniel Gappmaier	12	1				1				1			3				3			3
4	(16) -	0
5	Italy	12							8							10							12
5	(11) Alessandro Novello	3			2				F				0		0			0					1
5	(12) Cristian Carrica	9			3				3				1		1			1					F
5	(20) -	0
6	(United Kingdom) Great Britain	12							4							10							12
6	(13) Brendan Johnson	5				0			1			2				0			1		1
6	(14) Kyle Newman	7				1			2			3				1			F		-
6	(21) -	0
7	Slovakia	3							2							3							3
7	(9) Jan Halabrin	1			F			-				1		E			-					-
7	(10) Jan Meharik	2			1			1				0		F			-					-
7	(19) -	0
Placing	Pair / Rider Name	Total	1	2	3	4	5	6	7	8	9	10	11	12	13	14	15	16	17	18	19	20	21	22

m - exclusion for exceeding two minute time allowance • t - exclusion for touching the tapes • x - other exclusion • e - retired or mechanical failure • f - fell
ns - non-starter • nc - non-classify

gate A - inside	gate B	gate C	gate D - outside

== Final ==
- (Ukraine) Rivne Speedway Stadium, Rivne
- September 22

Placing	Pair / Rider Name	Total	1	2	3	4	5	6	7	8	9	10	11	12	13	14	15	16	17	18	19	20	21	22
1	Ukraine	26							10							19							26
1	(3) Andriy Karpov	16	3				3				3			3				2			2
1	(4) Oleksandr Loktaev	10	2				2				2			1				F			3
1	(16) Stanislav Melnichuk	0
2	Latvia	23							6							16							23
2	(11) Andžejs Ļebedevs	10			0				2				3		2			3					0
2	(12) Ķasts Puodžuks	13			3				1				2		3			1					3
2	(20) -	0
3	Denmark	22							7							12							22
3	(9) Kenni Larsen	11			2			1				2		0			3					3
3	(10) Peter Kildemand	11			1			3				1		2			2					2
3	(19) -	0
4	Poland	20							7							12							20
4	(7) Tomasz Gapinski	12		2				2			0					3				3			2
4	(8) Mariusz Puszakowski	8		3				0			1					1				2			1
4	(18) Szymon Kielbasa	0
5	Czech Republic	16							6							12							16
5	(13) Tomas Suchanek	3				2			-			0				-			1		-
5	(14) Vaclav Milik	1				1			0			-				0			-		E
5	(21) Josef Franc	12							3			3				3			3		E
6	Germany	10							2							7							10
6	(5) Keijo Bunning	1		0			0			1					0				0			0
6	(6) Tobias Busch	9		1			1			3					1				2			1
6	(17) -	0
7	Hungary	8							3							6							8
7	(1) Norbert Magosi	8	F			3				2			1				1			1
7	(2) -	0
7	(15) -	0
Placing	Pair / Rider Name	Total	1	2	3	4	5	6	7	8	9	10	11	12	13	14	15	16	17	18	19	20	21	22

m - exclusion for exceeding two minute time allowance • t - exclusion for touching the tapes • x - other exclusion • e - retired or mechanical failure • f - fell
ns - non-starter • nc - non-classify

gate A - inside	gate B	gate C	gate D - outside

== See also ==
- 2012 Speedway European Championship
