= 2016 Speedway Grand Prix Qualification =

Seasons
- ← 2015 2017 →

The 2016 Individual Speedway World Championship Grand Prix Qualification was a series of motorcycle speedway meetings used to determine the three riders who qualified for the 2016 Speedway Grand Prix. The series consisted of four qualifying rounds at Goričan, St Johann, Lonigo and Abensberg, two semi-finals at Terenzano and Riga and then the Grand Prix Challenge at Rybnik. The three riders that qualified were Bartosz Zmarzlik, Piotr Pawlicki Jr. and Chris Harris.

== Qualifying rounds ==
=== Round One ===
- 2 May 2015
- (Croatia) Goričan

Pos.	Rider	Points	Details
1	(Poland) Piotr Pawlicki Jr.	15	(3,3,3,3,3)
2	(Poland) Przemysław Pawlicki	14	(3,2,3,3,3)
3	(Ukraine) Andriy Karpov	12	(2,3,3,2,2)
4	(Denmark) Leon Madsen	11	(3,3,2,1,2)
5	(Croatia) Jurica Pavlic	10	(3,2,1,3,1)
6	(Sweden) Linus Sundström	9	(1,3,2,1,3)
7	(Sweden) Peter Ljung	9	(2,1,2,2,2)
8	(Latvia) Andžejs Ļebedevs	9	(0,2,2,3,2)
9	(Australia) Justin Sedgmen	8	(1,1,3,0,3)
10	(Russia) Andrey Kudryashov	6	(2,2,1,0,1)
11	(Czech Republic) Josef Franc	5	(1,0,1,2,1)
12	(Russia) Sergey Logachev	4	(2,1,1,0,U)
13	(Czech Republic) Matěj Kůs	3	(1,0,0,2,0)
14	(Slovenia) Aleksander Čonda	3	(W,1,0,1,1)
15	(Slovenia) Žiga Kovačič	1	(0,0,0,1,0)
16	(Slovenia) Nick Skorja	0	(0,0)
17	(Slovenia) Denis Štojs	0	(0)
18	(United Kingdom) Kyle Newman	0	(D)

=== Round Three ===
- 3 May 2015
- (Italy) Lonigo

Pos.	Rider	Points	Details
1	(Denmark) Kenneth Bjerre	14	(3,2,3,3,3)
2	(Australia) Max Fricke	12	(1,3,2,3,3)
3	(Czech Republic) Vaclav Milik	11	(2,0,3,3,3)
4	(Sweden) Antonio Lindbäck	11	(3,3,3,2,X)
5	(Sweden) Fredrik Lindgren	11	(2,3,2,2,2)
6	(Denmark) Jesper B. Monberg	10	(3,2,2,2,1)
7	(United States) Ricky Wells	9	(2,1,1,3,2)
8	(Poland) Kacper Gomolski	8+3	(1,2,3,1,1)
9	(France) Mathieu Trésarrieu	8+2	(3,3,0,0,2)
10	(Finland) Jari Mäkinen	6	(2,1,0,0,3)
11	(United Kingdom) Craig Cook	5	(0,2,E,1,2)
12	(Slovenia) Maks Gregorič	5	(0,1,1,2,1)
13	(United Kingdom) Daniel King	4	(0,1,2,1,0)
14	(Italy) Michele Paco Castagna	3	(1,0,0,1,1)
15	(New Zealand) Hayden Sims	1	(0,0,1,0,0)
16	(Italy) Nicolas Vicentin	1	(1,C,0,0,0)
17	(Italy) Pier Paolo Scagnetti	1	(1)

=== Round Two ===
- 2 May 2015
- (Austria) St Johann

Pos.	Rider	Points	Details
1	(Poland) Mirosław Jabłoński	14	(3,3,2,3,3)
2	(Denmark) Michael Jepsen Jensen	13	(1,3,3,3,3)
3	(Latvia) Maksims Bogdanovs	13	(2,3,3,2,3)
4	(Australia) Dakota North	12	(3,2,3,2,2)
5	(Germany) Tobias Kroner	11	(3,0,3,3,2)
6	(Poland) Karol Baran	10	(2,2,2,1,3)
7	(Ukraine) Aleksandr Loktaev	9	(2,3,2,0,2)
8	(Czech Republic) Eduard Krčmář	8+3	(3,1,1,2,1)
9	(Finland) Kauko Nieminen	8+W	(T,1,3,2,1)
10	(Russia) Vladimir Borodulin	5	(0,1,1,2,1)
11	(Austria) Dany Gappmaier	5	(2,1,0,1,1)
12	(United Kingdom) Richie Worrall	5	(1,T,1,1,2)
13	(France) Gabriel Dubernard	3	(1,1,1,0,0)
14	(Hungary) József Tabaka	2	(0,2,0,0,0)
15	(Slovenia) Jernej Pečnik	1	(0,0,0,1,0)
16	(Italy) Alessandro Novello	1	(1,0,0,0)
17	(Poland) Jakub Jamróg	0	(0)
18	(Austria) Fritz Wallner	0	(D)

=== Round Four ===
- 25 May 2015
- (Germany) Abensberg

Pos.	Rider	Points	Details
1	(Slovakia) Martin Vaculík	14	(3,2,3,3,3)
2	(Australia) Sam Masters	12	(3,3,2,1,3)
3	(Denmark) Peter Kildemand	11+3	(2,1,3,2,3)
4	(Sweden) Kim Nilsson	11+2	(2,3,1,3,2)
5	(Germany) Kevin Wölbert	11+D	(1,3,3,2,2)
6	(United Kingdom) Chris Harris	10	(1,1,2,3,3)
7	(Germany) Martin Smolinski	10	(2,2,2,2,2)
8	(Latvia) Kjastas Puodzuks	7+3	(0,1,3,3,D)
9	(France) David Bellego	7+D	(3,2,0,1,1)
10	(Denmark) Rasmus Jensen	6	(3,0,D,1,2)
11	(Czech Republic) Tomáš Suchánek	6	(2,2,0,2,0)
12	(Italy) Nicolas Covatti	5	(1,2,1,0,1)
13	(Poland) Grzegorz Walasek	3	(0,3,W,-,-)
14	(Germany) Mathias Schultz	3	(1,0,1,0,1)
15	(Hungary) Norbert Magosi	3	(D,1,1,0,1)
16	(Sweden) Oliver Berntzon	1	(0,0,0,1,0)
17	(Germany) Mathias Bartz	0	(0)
18	(Germany) Max Dilger	0	(0)

== Semi-finals ==
=== Semi-final 1 ===
- 27 June 2015
- (Italy) Terenzano

Pos.	Rider	Points	Details
1	(Italy) Nicolas Covatti	14	(3,3,2,3,3)
2	(Poland) Piotr Pawlicki Jr.	12+3	(3,1,3,2,3)
3	(Poland) Przemysław Pawlicki	12+D	(3,3,1,3,2)
4	(Czech Republic) Václav Milík	11	(0,3,3,3,2)
5	(United Kingdom) Chris Harris	9	(2,2,2,R,3)
6	(Sweden) Fredrik Lindgren	8+3	(1,2,2,1,2)
7	(Poland) Kacper Gomolski	8+2	(1,2,2,2,1)
8	(Sweden) Kim Nilsson	8+1	(1,3,3,0,1)
9	(Slovakia) Martin Vaculík	7	(2,0,R,2,3)
10	(Denmark) Michael Jepsen Jensen	7	(0,1,3,1,2)
11	(Denmark) Jesper B. Monberg	5	(3,1,0,1,R)
12	(Germany) Martin Smolinski	5	(2,0,1,2,0)
13	(Croatia) Jurica Pavlic	5	(2,1,R,1,1)
14	(Australia) Max Fricke	4	(1,0,0,3,F)
15	(Australia) Sam Masters	4	(F,2,1,R,1)
16	(France) David Bellego	1	(R,0,1,0,0)
	(Australia) Justin Sedgemen	DNR	
	(Italy) Alessandro Milanese	DNR	

=== Semi-final 2 ===
- 27 June 2015
- (Latvia) Riga

Pos.	Rider	Points	Details
1	(Denmark) Leon Madsen	14	(2,3,3,3,3)
2	(Ukraine) Andriy Karpov	12	(3,2,2,2,3)
3	(Latvia) Kjastas Puodzuks	10+3	(3,0,3,3,1)
4	(Ukraine) Aleksandr Loktaev	10+2	(2,3,1,1,3)
5	(Sweden) Linus Sundström	9	(1,1,3,1,3)
6	(Sweden) Antonio Lindbäck	9	(1,2,3,1,2)
7	(Latvia) Maksims Bogdanovs	9	(3,2,1,2,1)
8	(Germany) Kevin Wölbert	8	(1,3,2,1,1)
9	(Australia) Dakota North	7	(2,2,0,3,X)
10	(Latvia) Andžejs Ļebedevs	7	(0,1,1,3,2)
11	(Sweden) Peter Ljung	6	(3,1,0,0,2)
12	(Poland) Karol Baran	6	(0,3,0,2,1)
13	(Denmark) Kenneth Bjerre	5	(1,0,2,2,0)
14	(Poland) Mirosław Jabłoński	4	(0,R,1,0,2)
15	(United States) Ricky Wells	3	(2,1,0,0,0)
16	(Czech Republic) Eduard Krčmář	1	(0,1,0,0)
17	(Denmark) Peter Kildemand	0	(X)
	(Finland) Kauko Nieminen	DNR	

== 2015 Speedway Grand Prix Challenge ==
=== Grand Prix Challenge ===
- 5 September 2015
- (Poland) Rybnik
- Zmarzlik and Kildemand were nominated as wildcards.

Pos.	Rider	Points	Details
1	(Poland) Bartosz Zmarzlik	12	(3,2,3,3,1)
2	(Poland) Piotr Pawlicki Jr.	11+3	(3,3,1,3,1)
3	(United Kingdom) Chris Harris	11+2	(2,3,1,2,3)
4	(Sweden) Fredrik Lindgren	10	(1,3,3,0,3)
5	(Denmark) Peter Kildemand	10	(2,0,3,2,3)
6	(Czech Republic) Václav Milík	10	(1,3,2,2,2)
7	(Poland) Przemysław Pawlicki	10	(3,2,2,1,2)
8	(Ukraine) Andriy Karpov	7	(3,2,0,D,2)
9	(Denmark) Leon Madsen	7	(1,1,2,0,3)
10	(Italy) Nicolas Covatti	7	(1,1,1,3,1)
11	(Sweden) Linus Sundström	7	(0,2,2,2,1)
12	(Poland) Kacper Gomólski	6	(2,0,3,1,0)
13	(Sweden) Kim Nilsson	5	(0,1,1,1,2)
14	(Latvia) Maksims Bogdanovs	4	(2,1,D,1,D)
15	(Sweden) Antonio Lindbäck	3	(0,0,0,3,0)
16	(Latvia) Kjasts Puodžuks	0	(0,0,0,0,D)
	(Germany) Kevin Wölbert	DNR	
	(Slovakia) Martin Vaculík	DNR	

== See also ==
- 2015 Speedway Grand Prix
