= 2014 Speedway World Cup =

55th edition of the annual motorcycle speedway World Cup competition

Speedway World Cup
- Venue: Stadion Miejski im. Józefa Piłsudskiego
- Location: Poland
- Start date: 26 July
- End date: 2 August
- Nations: 9

Champions
- Denmark

The 2014 FIM Speedway World Cup (SWC) was the fourteenth FIM Speedway World Cup, the annual international speedway world championship tournament. It took place between 26 July and 2 August 2014 and involved nine national teams.

== Qualification ==
(Italy) Pista Olimpia Terenzano, Terenzano - 5 July 2014

National team	Pts	Scorers
Italy	36	Nicolás Covatti 15, Paco Castagna 10, Mattia Carpanese 9, Nicolas Vicentin 2
Germany	33	Martin Smolinski 11, Kai Huckenbeck 8, Tobias Kroner 7, Tobias Busch 7
Slovenia	32	Matej Žagar 21, Aleksander Čonda 6, Matic Voldrih 4, Denis Stojs 1
Russia	26	Vitaly Belousov 11, Denis Gizatullin 8, Andrey Kudriashov 7

== Qualified teams ==
Team	Qualified as	Finals appearance	Last appearance	2013 place
Poland	Host	14th	2013	1
Denmark	2013 SWC top eight	14th	2013	2
Australia	2013 SWC top eight	14th	2013	3
Czech Republic	2013 SWC top eight	13th	2013	4
United States	2013 SWC top eight	7th	2013	5
Latvia	2013 SWC top eight	2nd	2013	6
Great Britain	2013 SWC top eight	14th	2013	7
Sweden	2013 SWC top eight	14th	2013	8
Italy	Qualifying Round Winner	3rd	2004	QR

== Tournament ==
Semifinals
26 July — (England) King's Lynn
Great Britain	44
United States	37
Australia	36
Italy	10
29 July — (Sweden) Vastervik
Denmark	48
Sweden	43
Czech Republic	24
Latvia	11

Race-off
31 July — (Poland) Bydgoszcz
Australia	43
Sweden	32
United States	26
Czech Republic	24

Final
2 August — (Poland) Bydgoszcz (details)
Denmark	38
Poland	37
Australia	36
Great Britain	16

=== Semi finals ===
National team	Pts	Scorers
Great Britain	44	Tai Woffinden 12, Danny King 11, Chris Harris 11, Simon Stead 1
United States	37	Greg Hancock 19, Gino Manzares 9, Ricky Wells 5, Max Ruml 4
Australia	36	Jason Doyle 15, Troy Batchelor 14, Darcy Ward 6, Cameron Woodward 1
Italy	10	Nicolás Covatti 7, Paco Castagna 2, Mattia Carpanese 1, Nicolas Vicentin 0

National team	Pts	Scorers
Denmark	44	Mads Korneliussen 13, Hans Andersen 12, Peter Kildemand 12, Bjarne Pedersen 11
Sweden	43	Andreas Jonsson 16, Thomas H. Jonasson 11, Peter Ljung 9, Oliver Berntzon 7
Czech Republic	24	Eduard Krčmář 9, Václav Milík Jr. 7, Aleš Dryml Jr. 7, Josef Franc 1
Latvia	11	Maksims Bogdanovs 5, Andžejs Ļebedevs 4, Kjasts Puodžuks 2, Jevgeņijs Kostigovs 0

=== Race off ===
National team	Pts	Scorers
Australia	43	Darcy Ward 11, Troy Batchelor 11, Jason Doyle 10, Chris Holder 11
Sweden	32	Thomas H. Jonasson 11, Kim Nilsson, Oliver Berntzon 8, Andreas Jonsson 9
United States	26	Greg Hancock 21, Ricky Wells 4, Max Ruml 1, Gino Manzares 0
Czech Republic	24	Václav Milík Jr. 9, Eduard Krčmář 8, Aleš Dryml Jr. 5, Josef Franc 2

== Final ==
(full details)

National team	Pts	Scorers
Denmark	38	Nicki Pedersen 17, Niels-Kristian Iversen 11, Peter Kildemand 7, Mads Korneliussen 3
Poland	37	Krzysztof Kasprzak 11, Jarosław Hampel 11, Piotr Protasiewicz 9, Janusz Kołodziej 6
Australia	36	Jason Doyle 13, Chris Holder 11, Darcy Ward 10, Troy Batchelor 2
Great Britain	16	Tai Woffinden 12, Chris Harris 4, Danny King 0, Simon Stead 0

== Final classification ==
Pos.	National team	Pts.
Gold	Denmark	38
Silver	Poland	37
Bronze	Australia	36
4	Great Britain	16
5	Sweden	32
6	United States	26
7	Czech Republic	24
8	Latvia	11
9	Italy	10

== See also ==
- 2014 Speedway Grand Prix
