= 2012 Speedway Under-21 World Championship =

World motorcycle speedway event

World Under-21 Championship
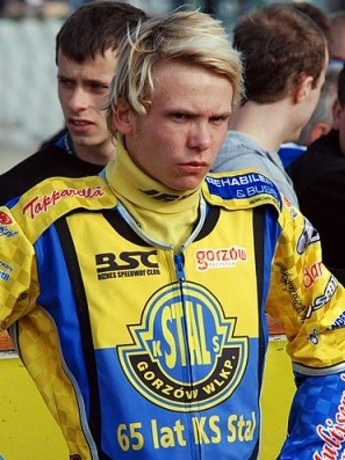
- Michael Jepsen Jensen

The 2012 Individual Speedway Junior World Championship was the 36th edition of the FIM World motorcycle speedway Under-21 Championships.

The final was run over a series of seven races between 21 July and November 2011. Michael Jepsen Jensen became the new champion.

== Qualification ==
Four qualifying rounds saw eight riders from each round progressing to the semi-final round. The top seven riders from both semi-finals were automatically qualified for the Final series.

- Round One - 29 April 2012 (Germany) Anton-Treffer-Stadion, Neustadt an der Donau
- Round Two - 19 May 2012 (Croatia) Stadium Milenium, Goričan
- Round Three - 19 May 2012 (Finland) Seinäjoki Speedway, Seinäjoki
- Round Four - 19 May 2012 (Netherlands) Baansport, Blijham

== Semi-finals ==
- Semi-Final One - 2 June 2012 (Italy) Pista Olimpia Terenzano, Terenzano
- Semi-Final Two - 2 June 2012 (Ukraine) Mototrek Hirnyk, Chervonohrad

== Final series ==
There were fourteen permanent riders (riders placed 1st to 7th in both semi finals were automatically qualified for all Final meetings). Two Wild Card riders were nominated to each final meeting (approval and nomination by CCP Bureau). Two Track Reserve riders were nominated by national federation.

#	Date	Venue	Winners	Runner-up	3rd place
1	21 July	(Italy) Santa Marina Stadium, Lonigo	(Denmark) Michael Jepsen Jensen	(Poland) Przemysław Pawlicki	(Poland) Bartosz Zmarzlik
2	4 August	(Slovenia) Petišovci Stadium, Lendava	(Poland) Maciej Janowski	(Denmark) Mikkel Bech Jensen	(Poland) Patryk Dudek
3	17 August	(England) Brandon Stadium, Coventry	(Denmark) Michael Jepsen Jensen	(Poland) Przemysław Pawlicki	(Denmark) Mikkel Bech Jensen
4	15 September	(Poland) The Swallow's Nest, Tarnów	(Denmark) Michael Jepsen Jensen	(Poland) Patryk Dudek	(Poland) Maciej Janowski
5	13 October	(Czech Republic) Svítkov Stadium, Pardubice	(Poland) Maciej Janowski	(Denmark) Michael Jepsen Jensen	(Ukraine) Aleksandr Loktaev
6	3 November	(Argentina) Antonio Miranda Circuit, Bahía Blanca	(Denmark) Michael Jepsen Jensen	(Poland) Maciej Janowski	(Sweden) Pontus Aspgren
7	10 November	(Argentina) Antonio Miranda Circuit, Bahía Blanca	(Poland) Maciej Janowski	(Denmark) Michael Jepsen Jensen	(Denmark) Mikkel Bech Jensen

== Classification ==
The meeting classification was according to the points scored during the meeting (heats 1–20). The total points scored by each rider during each final meeting (heat 1–20) were credited also as World Championship points. The FIM Speedway Under 21 World Champion was the rider having collected most World Championship points at the end of the series. In case of a tie between one or more riders in the final overall classification, a run-off will decide the 1st, 2nd and 3rd place. For all other placings, the better-placed rider in the last final meeting will be the better placed rider.

Pos.	Rider	Points	(Italy)	(Slovenia)	(England)	(Poland)	(Czech Republic)	(Argentina)	(Argentina)
Gold	(Denmark) Michael Jepsen Jensen	90	12	10	15	14	13	13	13
Silver	(Poland) Maciej Janowski	89	11	13	10	13	14	13	15
Bronze	(Denmark) Mikkel Bech Jensen	75	11	12	11	6	11	11	13
4	(Denmark) Mikkel Michelsen	59	9	7	8	10	6	8	11
5	(Denmark) Nicklas Porsing	50	8	–	7	9	8	11	7
6	(Poland) Przemysław Pawlicki	43	12	9	12	10	–	–	–
7	(Denmark) Nikolaj Busk Jakobsen	41	9	2	5	3	7	7	8
8	(Sweden) Pontus Aspgren	40	8	–	–	1	8	12	11
9	(Czech Republic) Václav Milík, Jr.	39	4	6	1	2	5	10	11
10	(Ukraine) Aleksandr Loktaev	37	6	8	–	10	13	–	–
11	(Australia) Sam Masters	37	–	6	10	–	5	8	8
12	(Poland) Patryk Dudek	30	–	11	6	13	–	–	–
13	(Poland) Bartosz Zmarzlik	29	11	9	9	–	–	–	–
14	(Poland) Tobiasz Musielak	25	5	8	2	10	–	–	–
15	(Australia) Dakota North	21	–	–	–	–	5	8	8
16	(Poland) Piotr Pawlicki Jr.	21	9	8	4	–	–	–	–
17	(Poland) Damian Adamczak	18	2	8	3	5	–	–	–
18	(United Kingdom) Kyle Newman	10	–	–	10	–	–	–	–
19	(Czech Republic) Michal Skurla	10	–	–	–	–	–	5	5
20	(Latvia) Andzejs Lebedevs	9	–	–	–	–	9	–	–
21	(Argentina) Facundo Albin	8	–	–	–	–	–	4	4
22	(Poland) Jakub Jamróg	7	–	–	–	7	–	–	–
23	(Czech Republic) Eduard Krčmář	6	–	–	–	–	6	–	–
23	(Poland) Kacper Gomólski	6	–	–	–	6	–	–	–
25	(Argentina) Facundo Cuello	5	–	–	–	–	–	2	3
25	(United Kingdom) Tom Perry	5	–	–	5	–	–	–	–
27	(Czech Republic) Zdenek Holub	4	–	–	–	–	4	–	–
28	(Argentina) Fernando Garcia	4	–	–	–	–	–	2	2
29	(Czech Republic) Jan Holub III	3	–	–	–	–	3	–	–
30	(Argentina) Sebastian Clemete	3	–	–	–	–	–	2	1
31	(Italy) Michele Paco Castagna	2	2	–	–	–	–	–	–
31	(Czech Republic) Roman Cejka	2	–	–	–	–	2	–	–
33	(Argentina) Alejandro Iglesias	1	–	–	–	–	–	1	0
33	(Slovenia) Matic Ivacic	1	–	1	–	–	–	–	–
33	(Italy) Nicolas Vicentin	1	1	–	–	–	–	–	–
36	(Croatia) Dino Kovacic	0	–	0	–	–	–	–	–
36	(Poland) Ernst Koza	0	–	–	–	0	–	–	–

== See also ==
- 2012 Speedway Grand Prix
- 2012 Team Speedway Junior World Championship
