= 2014 European Pairs Speedway Championship =

Motorcycle racing competition

Seasons
- ← 2013 2015 →

The 2014 European Pairs Speedway Championship was the 11th edition of the European Pairs Speedway Championship. The final was held at the Areál Ploché dráhy Divišov in Divišov, Czech Republic on 13 September. The Czech Republic won their fifth title.

== Calendar ==
Day	Venue	Winner	
Semi-final
1 May	(Hungary) Gázvezeték Street Sports Complex, Debrecen	Latvia	result
Final
13 September	(Czech Republic) Areál Ploché dráhy Divišov, Divišov	Czech Republic	result

== Rules ==
- Semi-Final: 3 pairs will qualify to the Final
- Germany Poland and Ukraine were allocated to the Final after finishing in the top three in 2013. The Czech Republic were allocated to the Final as hosts.

== Semi-final ==
- (Hungary) Debrecen
- May 1

Placing	Pair / Rider Name	Total	1	2	3	4	5	6	7	8	9	10	11	12	13	14	15	16	17	18	19	20	21	22
1	Latvia	23							6							15							23
1	(7) Andžejs Ļebedevs	15		3				3			1					2				3			3
1	(8) Ķasts Puodžuks	8		0				0			3					3				2			0
2	Russia	22							9							16							22
2	(3) Denis Gizatullin	9	2				3				0			2				1			1
2	(4) Vitalyi Belousov	13	3				1				2			3				2			2
3	Hungary	19							4							10							19
3	(1) József Tabaka	6	1			1				1			0				3
3	(2) Roland Benkő	10	0			2				2			3				2			1
3	(15) Norbert Magosi	3																		3
4	Slovenia	18							7							15							18
4	(9) Maks Gregorič	10			3			2				3		1			1					0
4	(10) Samo Kukovica	4										2		2
4	(19) Matic Voldrih	4			2			0									0					2
5	Slovakia	14							4							8							14
5	(9) Martin Vaculík	13			0			3				3		1			3					3
5	(10) Patrik Buri	1			0			1				0		0
6	Italy	11							5							7							11
6	(5) Alessandro Novello	6		2			2			0					0				1			1
6	(6) Pierpaolo Scagnetti	5		1			0			1					1				0			2
Placing	Pair / Rider Name	Total	1	2	3	4	5	6	7	8	9	10	11	12	13	14	15	16	17	18	19	20	21	22

m - exclusion for exceeding two minute time allowance • t - exclusion for touching the tapes • x - other exclusion • e - retired or mechanical failure • f - fell
ns - non-starter • nc - non-classify

gate A - inside	gate B	gate C	gate D - outside

== Final ==
- (Czech Republic) Divišov

1st	2nd	3rd
Czech Republic - 26; Václav Milík, Jr. - 16; Eduard Krčmář - 10; Tomáš Suchánek - DNR	Poland - 24; Damian Baliński - 14; Sebastian Ułamek - 10; Adrian Miedziński - 0	Russia - 20; Denis Gizatullin - 9 Vitalyi Belousov - 11

4th	5th	6th	7th
Germany - 17; Tobias Busch - 10; Michael Härtel - 7 Max Dilger - 0	Latvia - 16; Andžejs Ļebedevs - 8 Ķasts Puodžuks - 8	Hungary - 11; Norbert Magosi - 10; Roland Benkő - 1	Ukraine - 10; Andriy Karpov - 0 Stanislav Melnichuk - 8 Andriy Kobrin - 4

== See also ==
- 2014 Speedway European Championship
