= 2009 European Pairs Speedway Championship =

Motorcycle racing competition

Seasons
- ← 2008 2010 →

The 2009 European Pairs Speedway Championship was the sixth edition of the UEM European Pairs Speedway Championship. The Final was held on 26 September 2009 at the Borsod Volán Stadion in Miskolc, Hungary; it was second Final in Hungary, but first in Miskolc. The championship was won by Czech Republic pair and they beat Russia and the defending Champions Poland.

== Results ==
In the Final will be the defending Champion Poland, Czech Republic (2nd place in 2008 Final), Russia (3rd place), host team Hungary (4th place) and Latvia (5th place). A last finalist will be determined in one Semi-Final. In Ljubljana, Slovenia on May 13 will be Austria (6th place), Germany (7th place), Ukraine, Finland, host team Slovenia, Italy and Croatia.

- Semi-Final
- (Slovenia) Ljubljana
- 23 May 2009

Pos.	National team	Pts
1	Slovenia	28
2	Germany	25
3	Italy	21+3
4	Ukraine	21+2
5	Austria	13
6	Croatia	10
7	Finland	7

- The Final
- (Hungary) Miskolc
- 26 September 2009

Pos.	National team	Pts
1	Czech Republic	29
2	Russia	25
3	Poland	19
4	Hungary	16
5	Germany	16
6	Slovenia	10
7	Latvia	10

== Semi-final ==
- 23 May 2009 (16:20)
- SVN Ljubljana, Stadion Ilirija (Length: 398 m)
- Referee: (Russia) Andrei Savin
- Jury President: None

Placing	Pair / Rider Name	Total	1	2	3	4	5	6	7	8	9	10	11	12	13	14	15	16	17	18	19	20	21	22
1	Slovenia	28							10							20							28
1	(5) Matej Žagar	18		3			3			3					3				3			3
1	(6) Maks Gregorič	10+4		2*			2*			2*					2*				1			1
1	(17) Izak Šantej	0
2	Germany	25							6							15							25
2	(7) Martin Smolinski	16		1				3			3					3				3			3
2	(8) Tommy Stange	9+4		0				2*			2*					1				2*			2*
3	Italy	21 +3							9							14							21
3	(13) Mattia Carpanese	8+3				2*			1			1*				-			2		2*
3	(14) Guglielmo Franchetti	11				3			3			2				0			-		3			3
3	(21) Mattia Tadiello	2														2			T
4	Ukraine	21 +2							6							14							21
4	(9) Andriy Karpov	15			3			1				3		3			3					2		2
4	(10) Aleksandr Boroday	6+2			2			0				X		2*			2*					0
4	(19) Andriy Kobrin	0
5	Austria	14							3							9							14
5	(11) Manuel Novotny	3+1			1				-				2*		F			-					-
5	(12) Fritz Wallner	9			0				2				3		-			3					1
5	(20) Lukas Simon	2							M						1			1					0
6	Croatia	10							5							7							10
6	(3) Renato Cvetko	5	3				1				1			X				0			0
6	(4) Marko Vlah	5	1				0				0			1				2			1
7	Finland	7							3							5							7
7	(1) Jari Makinen	4	2			0				X			1				1			X
7	(2) Joni Keskinen	3	0			1				1			M				0			1
Placing	Pair / Rider Name	Total	1	2	3	4	5	6	7	8	9	10	11	12	13	14	15	16	17	18	19	20	21	22

m - exclusion for exceeding two minute time allowance • t - exclusion for touching the tapes • x - other exclusion • e - retired or mechanical failure • f - fell
ns - non-starter • nc - non-classify

gate A - inside	gate B	gate C	gate D - outside

== Final ==
- 26 September 2009 (15:00)
- HUN Miskolc, Speedway Arena Miskolc (Length: 367 m)
- Referee: (Germany) Frank Ziegler
- Jury President: (Poland) Andrzej Grodzki

Placing	Pair / Rider Name	Total	1	2	3	4	5	6	7	8	9	10	11	12	13	14	15	16	17	18	19	20	21
1	Czech Republic	29							10							20							29
1	(1) Aleš Dryml, Jr.	13+3	3			2*				3			2*				2*			1
1	(2) Lukáš Dryml	16+2	2*			3				2*			3				3			3
1	(15) Matěj Kůs	0
2	Russia	25							5							15							25
2	(3) Artem Laguta	6	0				-				-			3				-			3
2	(4) Renat Gafurov	10+2	-				3				3			-				2*			2*
2	(16) Grigory Laguta	9+2	1				1				2*			2*				3
3	Poland	19							7							12							19
3	(7) Robert Miśkowiak	6+2		2				2*			0					-				0			2*
3	(8) Ronnie Jamroży	1		Fx				-			-					1				-			-
3	(18) Daniel Jeleniewski	12						3			1					3				2			3
4	Hungary	16							8							14							16
4	(11) László Szatmári	3+1			-				2*				1		-			-					X
4	(12) Norbert Magosi	10			3				3				0		3			0					1
4	(20) József Tabaka	3+1			0										2*			1
5	Germany	16							4							10							16
5	(9) Martin Smolinski	10			2			1				3		0			1					3
5	(10) Christian Hefenbrock	6+3			1*			0				2*		1			0					2*
5	(19) Max Dilger	0
6	Slovenia	10							5							7							10
6	(5) Maks Gregorič	0		Fx			0			-					0				-			0
6	(6) Matej Žagar	9		3			2			1					1				2			-
6	(17) Izak Šantej	1								0									0			1
7	Latvia	10							2							5							10
7	(13) Jevgēņijs Karavackis	2				0			F			0				Fx			1		1
7	(14) Vjačeslavs Giruckis	8				1			1			1				2			3		0
Placing	Pair / Rider Name	Total	1	2	3	4	5	6	7	8	9	10	11	12	13	14	15	16	17	18	19	20	21

m - exclusion for exceeding two minute time allowance • t - exclusion for touching the tapes • x - other exclusion • e - retired or mechanical failure • f - fell
ns - non-starter • nc - non-classify

gate A - inside	gate B	gate C	gate D - outside

== See also ==
- motorcycle speedway
- 2009 Individual Speedway European Championship
