= 2010 European Pairs Speedway Championship =

Motorcycle racing competition

Seasons
- ← 2009 2011 →

The 2010 European Pairs Speedway Championship was the seventh UEM European Pairs Speedway Championship season. The Final took place on 18 September 2010 in Stralsund, Germany. The Championship was won by the defending Champion Czech Republic who beat host team Germany and Croatia.

== Results ==
- Semi-Final One
- (Ukraine) Rivne Speedway Stadium, Rivne
- 17 July 2010

Pos.	National team	Pts
1	Latvia	26+3
2	Ukraine	26+2
3	Russia	22
4	Ukraine C	15
5	Romania	13
6	Ukraine B	12
7	Austria	10

- Semi-Final Two
- (Poland) Stadion Kolejarz, Opole
- 21 August 2010

Pos.	National team	Pts
1	Poland	25
2	Czech Republic	24
3	Croatia	21
4	Poland B	18
5	Finland	15
6	Slovenia	14
7	Italy	9

- The Final
- (Germany) Paul Greifzu Stadium, Stralsund
- 18 September 2010

Pos.	National team	Pts
1	Czech Republic	24
2	Germany	20+3
3	Croatia	20+2
4	Russia	19
5	Latvia	18
6	Ukraine	15
7	Poland	10

== Heat details ==
=== Semi-Final One ===
- (Ukraine) Rivne
- 17 July 2010
- Referee and Jury President: Frank Ziegler
- References
- Changes:

Hungary → Ukraine B
Norway → Ukraine C

Placing	Pair / Rider Name	Total	1	2	3	4	5	6	7	8	9	10	11	12	13	14	15	16	17	18	19	20	21	22
1	Latvia	26 +3							10							16							26
1	(1) Vjačeslavs Giruckis	15+1	2*			3				1			3				3			3				3
1	(2) Leonīds Paura	11+4	3			2*				R			2*				2*			2*
2	Ukraine	26 +2							6							16							26
2	(5) Andriy Karpov	15		3			0			3					3				3			3		2
2	(6) Aleksandr Boroday	11+5		2*			1			2*					2*				2*			2*
2	(17) Jarosław Paluchowicz	0
3	Russia	22							6							16							22
3	(3) Renat Gafurov	10	1				3				3			3				R			N
3	(4) Simon Vlasov	12+3	R				2*				2*			2*				3			3
4	Ukraine C	15							8							10							15
4	(11) Władimir Tejgel	12			3				3				1		1			2					2
4	(12) Taras Fedorenko	3+2			2*				0				0		N			F					1*
5	Romania	13							4							9							13
5	(13) Alexandru Toma	9+1				1			2			2				2			1		1*
5	(14) Fanel Popa	4+2				0			1*			T				1*			0		2
6	Ukraine B	12							4							8							12
6	(7) Vitaliy Lysak	3+1		1				1*			1					N				N			N
6	(8) Stanislav Ohorodnyk	9		0				2			0					3				1			3
7	Austria	10							3							8							10
7	(9) Daniel Gappmaier	1			F			0				1		0			0					0
7	(10) Fritz Wallner	9			R			3				3		1			1					1
Placing	Pair / Rider Name	Total	1	2	3	4	5	6	7	8	9	10	11	12	13	14	15	16	17	18	19	20	21	22

m - exclusion for exceeding two minute time allowance • t - exclusion for touching the tapes • x - other exclusion • e - retired or mechanical failure • f - fell
ns - non-starter • nc - non-classify

gate A - inside	gate B	gate C	gate D - outside

=== Semi-Final Two ===
- (Poland) Opole
- 21 August 2010
- Referee and Jury President: Istvan Darago
- References
- Change:

France → Poland B

Placing	Pair / Rider Name	Total	1	2	3	4	5	6	7	8	9	10	11	12	13	14	15	16	17	18	19	20	21
1	Poland	27							9							17							27
1	(1) Patryk Dudek	14	3			-				2			3				3			3
1	(2) Artur Mroczka	7	1			3				1*			-				-			2*
1	(15) Maciej Janowski	6				2*							2*				2*
2	Czech Republic	24							10							15							24
2	(11) Aleš Dryml, Jr.	12			2*				2*				3		2			2*					1
2	(12) Matěj Kůs	12			3				3				0		0			3					3
2	(20) Jan Jaros	0
3	Croatia	21							7							14							21
3	(5) Dino Kovacic	3		1			R			0					1				1			0
3	(6) Jurica Pavlic	18		3			3			3					3				3			3
4	Poland B	18							4							14							18
4	(9) Adam Czechowicz	6			0			1*				2*		2*			-					1*
4	(10) Michał Mitko	12			1			2				3		3			1					2
4	(19) Łukasz Piecha	0															0
5	Finland	15							5							11							15
5	(3) Jari Makinen	9	0				2				3			1				1			2
5	(4) Pasi Pulliainen	6	2				1*				2*			0				0			1*
6	Slovenia	14							5							11							14
6	(7) Aleksander Čonda	9		2				3			X					2*				0			2
6	(8) Aljosa Remih	1		-				-			1					-				-			-
6	(18) Ales Kraljic	4		0				0								3				1			0
7	Italy	9							2							4							9
7	(13) Mattia Carpanese	8				1			1			0				1			2		3
7	(14) Mattia Cavicchioli	1				0			0			1				0			0		0
Placing	Pair / Rider Name	Total	1	2	3	4	5	6	7	8	9	10	11	12	13	14	15	16	17	18	19	20	21

m - exclusion for exceeding two minute time allowance • t - exclusion for touching the tapes • x - other exclusion • e - retired or mechanical failure • f - fell
ns - non-starter • nc - non-classify

gate A - inside	gate B	gate C	gate D - outside

=== The Final ===
- (Germany) Stralsund
- 18 September 2010
- Referee: Wojciech Grodzki
- Jury President: C. Bergstrom
- References

Placing	Pair / Rider Name	Total	1	2	3	4	5	6	7	8	9	10	11	12	13	14	15	16	17	18	19	20	21	22
1	Czech Republic	24							9							18							24
1	(7) Aleš Dryml, Jr.	13		1				3			3					3				2			1
1	(8) Lukáš Dryml	11+2		3				2*			2*					1				0			3
1	(18) Matěj Kůs	0
2	Germany	20 +3							5							11							20
2	(5) Martin Smolinski	1		0			1			-					-				-			-
2	(6) Tobias Kroner	14+1		2			2			3					2				2*			3		3
2	(17) Roberto Haupt	5								1					0				3			1
3	Croatia	20 +2							5							14							20
3	(11) Jurica Pavlic	13			0				2				3		3			3					2	2
3	(12) Dino Kovacic	7+2			2				1*				2*		1			1					0
4	Russia	19							5							14							19
4	(9) Simon Vlasov	1			1			-				-		-			0					-
4	(10) Renat Gafurov	9+1			-			1				2*		3			3					X
4	(19) Denis Gizatullin	9			3			0				3		1								2
5	Latvia	18							8							11							18
5	(1) Jevgēņijs Karavackis	10+1	3			2				2			1				1*			1
5	(2) Leonid Paura	8+2	2*			1*				R			0				2			3
6	Ukraine	15							6							9							15
6	(13) Andriy Karpov	13				3			3			1				2			1		3
6	(14) Aleksandr Boroday	2+1				0			0			0				0			0		2*
7	Poland	10							4							7							10
7	(3) Patryk Dudek	8	0				3				0			2				2			1
7	(4) Artur Mroczka	2	1				-				1			0				-			0
7	(16) Alan Marcinkowski	0					0											0
Placing	Pair / Rider Name	Total	1	2	3	4	5	6	7	8	9	10	11	12	13	14	15	16	17	18	19	20	21	22

m - exclusion for exceeding two minute time allowance • t - exclusion for touching the tapes • x - other exclusion • e - retired or mechanical failure • f - fell
ns - non-starter • nc - non-classify

gate A - inside	gate B	gate C	gate D - outside

== See also ==
- 2010 Individual Speedway European Championship
- 2010 in sports
