= 2020 European Pairs Speedway Championship =

European motorcycle speedway event

The 2020 European Pairs Speedway Championship was the 17th edition of the European Pairs Speedway Championship. the final was held at the Pista Olimpia Terenzano in Terenzano, Italy on 17 October.

The title was won by Poland for the eighth time.

== Final ==
Position	team	Riders	Points
1	Poland	Jakub Jamróg (17), Viktor Trofimov Jr. (8)	25
2	Latvia	Andžejs Ļebedevs (17), Oļegs Mihailovs (5), Jevgeņijs Kostigovs (1)	23
3	France	Dimitri Bergé (12), David Bellego (9)	21
4	Czech Republic	Daniel Klíma (10), Josef Franc (9), Zdeněk Holub (1)	20
5	Italy	Nicolás Covatti (12), Nicolas Vicentin (6), Michele Paco Castagna (0)	18
6	Hungary	Norbert Magosi (9), Roland Kovacs (3)	12
7	Slovakia	David Pacalaj (6), Jakub Valkovic (0)	6

== See also ==
- 2020 Speedway European Championship
