= 2004 European Pairs Speedway Championship =

Motorcycle racing competition

Seasons
- ← none 2005 →

The 2004 European Pairs Speedway Championship was the inaugural edition of the European Pairs Speedway Championship. The final was held in Debrecen, Hungary on 12 September. The Czech Republic won the first edition of the Championship.

== Semifinal 1 ==
- (Italy) Terenzano
- ?
- only 14 heats

Draw 1. (Norway) → (Italy) B

Placing	Pair / Rider Name	Total	1	2	3	4	5	6	7	8	9	10	11	12	13	14	15	16	17	18	19	20	21
1	Germany	17							10							17							17
1	(11) Martin Smolinski	10			2				2				3		3
1	(12) Thomas Stange	7			3				3				0		1
1	(20) Christian Hefenbrock	0
2	Poland	16							10							16							16
2	(7) Rafał Szombierski	8		2				3			1					2
2	(8) Krzysztof Kasprzak	8		3				2			2					1
2	(18) -	0
3	Slovenia	12							4							12							12
3	(3) Izak Šantej	6	0				0				3			3
3	(4) Jernej Kolenko	6	3				1				0			2
3	(16) Denis Štojs	0
4	Austria	11							6							11							11
4	(13) Fritz Wallner	9				3			1			2				3
4	(14) Manuel Hauzinger	2				2			0			0				0
4	(21) Mario Ozelt	0
5	France	11							4							8							11
5	(1) Stephane Trésarrieu	4	1			1				-			2
5	(2) Mathieu Trésarrieu	1	E			-				1			-
5	(15) Sebastien Trésarrieu	6				2				1							3
6	Italy	10							6							10							10
6	(5) Andrea Maida	3		1			2			E					0
6	(6) Daniele Tessari	0		0			-			-					-
6	(17) Simone Terenzani	7					3			2					2
7	Italy B	7							3							7							7
7	(9) Massimo Zambon	4			0							3		1
7	(10) Guglielmo Franchetti	2			1			1				0		-
7	(19) Mattia Carpanese	1						1						0
Placing	Pair / Rider Name	Total	1	2	3	4	5	6	7	8	9	10	11	12	13	14	15	16	17	18	19	20	21

m - exclusion for exceeding two minute time allowance • t - exclusion for touching the tapes • x - other exclusion • e - retired or mechanical failure • f - fell
ns - non-starter • nc - non-classify

gate A - inside	gate B	gate C	gate D - outside

== Semifinal 2 ==
- (Ukraine) Rivne Speedway Stadium, Rivne
- ?

Draw 1. (Netherlands) → (Ukraine) B
Draw 2. (Slovakia) → (Ukraine) C

Placing	Pair / Rider Name	Total	1	2	3	4	5	6	7	8	9	10	11	12	13	14	15	16	17	18	19	20	21
1	Russia	27							10							18							27
1	(5) Wladimir Dubinin	4		-			2			2					-				-			-
1	(6) Denis Gizatullin	9		2			3			-					0				1			3
1	(17) Renat Gafurov	14		3						3					3				3			2
2	Czech Republic	23							10							18							23
2	(11) Bohumil Brhel	12			3				2				2		2			3					F
2	(12) Aleš Dryml, Jr.	11			2				3				3		1			2					X
2	(20) -	0
3	Ukraine	22							6							14							22
3	(7) Viktor Gajdym	11		0				2			3					3				X			3
3	(8) Andrey Karpov	11		1				3			2					0				3			2
3	(18) -	0
4	Latvia	21							6							14							21
4	(13) Leonid Paura	7				2			0			2				1			0		2
4	(14) Kjasts Puodžuks	14				3			1			3				2			2		3
4	(21) -	0
5	Ukraine B	11							4							6							11
5	(1) Sergey Senko	11	3			1				1			1				3			2
5	(2) Lyubomir Vojtyk	0	F			N				0			0				X			N
5	(15) -	0
6	Croatia	10							2							6							10
6	(9) Marko Otto	2			0			0				0		0			1					1
6	(10) Ivan Vargek	8			1			1				1		3			2					0
6	(19) -	0
7	Ukraine C	9							4							8							9
7	(3) Aleksandr Pyatnichko	7	2				1				1			2				N			1
7	(4) Ivan Mironov	2	1				0				0			1				0			N
7	(16) -	0
Placing	Pair / Rider Name	Total	1	2	3	4	5	6	7	8	9	10	11	12	13	14	15	16	17	18	19	20	21

m - exclusion for exceeding two minute time allowance • t - exclusion for touching the tapes • x - other exclusion • e - retired or mechanical failure • f - fell
ns - non-starter • nc - non-classify

gate A - inside	gate B	gate C	gate D - outside

== Final ==
- Final
- 2004-09-12
- (Hungary) Debrecen
- Referee:

Placing	Pair / Rider Name	Total	1	2	3	4	5	6	7	8	9	10	11	12	13	14	15	16	17	18	19	20	21	22
1	Czech Republic	28							10							18							28
1	(9) Aleš Dryml, Jr.	12+3			2*			2*				3		1			2*					2*
1	(10) Bohumil Brhel	16			3			3				1		3			3					3
1	(19) Lukáš Dryml	0
2	Russia	20 +3							8							13							20
2	(13) Simon Vlasov	0				-			-			-				F			-		-
2	(14) Siergiej Filiushin	5				1			3			F				-			E		1
2	(21) Renat Gafurov	15+1				2			2*			2				3			3		3			3
3	Poland	20 +2							8							16							20
3	(1) Rafał Szombierski	9+1	3			3				-			2*				1			-				2
3	(2) Tomasz Gapiński	5+1	2*			-				0			3				0			E
3	(15) Robert Kościecha	6				E				3										3
4	Hungary	20 +1							6							13							20
4	(3) Sandor Tihanyi	13+1	1				3				2*			2				3			2			1
4	(4) Norbert Magosi	3	0				-				3			0				-			-
4	(16) Attila Stefani	4+2					2*											2*			0
5	Germany	16							6							10							16
5	(7) Mirko Wolter	7+1		2*				0			1					1				1			2
5	(8) Tobias Kroner	9+1		3				1			0					2				2			1*
6	Slovenia	12							2							8							12
6	(11) Izak Šantej	7			1				1				1		3			1					0
6	(12) Denis Štojs	5+1			0				E				0		2*			0					3
7	Ukraine	9							2							6							9
7	(5) Siergiej Senko	2+1		1			0			1*					E				N			N
7	(6) Igor Borisenko	7		E			1			2					1				2			1
Placing	Pair / Rider Name	Total	1	2	3	4	5	6	7	8	9	10	11	12	13	14	15	16	17	18	19	20	21	22

m - exclusion for exceeding two minute time allowance • t - exclusion for touching the tapes • x - other exclusion • e - retired or mechanical failure • f - fell
ns - non-starter • nc - non-classify

gate A - inside	gate B	gate C	gate D - outside

== See also ==
- 2004 Individual Speedway European Championship
