= European Pairs Speedway Championship =

European speedway event

European Pairs Championship
- Sport: Motorcycle speedway
- Founded: 2004
- Continent: Europe
- Most titles: Poland (10 times); Aleš Dryml, Jr. (4 times)

The European Pairs Speedway Championship is an annual speedway event held in different countries organised by the European Motorcycle Union (UEM) since 2004.

== Previous winners ==
Year	Venue	Winners	2nd place	3rd place
2004	(Hungary) Debrecen; Gázvezeték Complex	Czech Republic; Bohumil Brhel; Aleš Dryml Jr.	Russia; Renat Gafurov; Siergiej Filiushin; Simon Vlasov	Poland; Rafał Szombierski; Robert Kościecha; Tomasz Gapiński
2005	(Poland) Gdańsk; Stadion Wybrzeże	Poland; Krzysztof Kasprzak; Robert Kościecha; Janusz Kołodziej	Czech Republic; Aleš Dryml Jr. Bohumil Brhel	Slovenia; Matej Žagar; Izak Šantej
2006	(Slovenia) Lendava; Petišovci Stadium	Poland; Sebastian Ułamek; Wiesław Jaguś	Slovenia; Jernej Kolenko; Matej Žagar	Hungary; Norbert Magosi; László Szatmári
2007	(Italy) Terenzano; Pista Olimpia	Czech Republic; Lukáš Dryml; Aleš Dryml, Jr. Zdeněk Simota	Poland; Krzysztof Jabłoński; Sławomir Drabik; Adam Skórnicki	Russia; Renat Gafurov; Denis Gizatullin
2008	(Austria) Natschbach-Loipersbach; Speedway Stadium	Poland; Sebastian Ułamek; Karol Ząbik; Adam Skórnicki	Czech Republic; Lukáš Dryml; Adrian Rymel; Aleš Dryml, Jr.	Russia; Renat Gafurov; Roman Povazhny; Aleksiej Charczenko
2009	(Hungary) Miskolc; Borsod Volán Stadion	Czech Republic; Aleš Dryml, Jr. Lukáš Dryml	Russia; Renat Gafurov; Grigory Laguta; Artem Laguta	Poland; Daniel Jeleniewski; Robert Miśkowiak; Ronnie Jamroży
2010	(Germany) Stralsund; Paul Greifzu Stadium	Czech Republic; Aleš Dryml, Jr. Lukáš Dryml	Germany; Tobias Kroner; Roberto Haupt; Martin Smolinski	Croatia; Jurica Pavlic; Dino Kovacic
2011	(Poland) Piła; Polonia Piła Stadium	Poland; Jarosław Hampel; Przemysław Pawlicki; Piotr Pawlicki Jr.	Hungary; Norbert Magosi; József Tabaka	Russia; Renat Gafurov; Viktor Golubovsky
2012	(Ukraine) Rivne; Rivne Speedway Stadium	Ukraine; Andriy Karpov; Aleksandr Loktaev	Latvia; Kjasts Puodžuks; Andžejs Ļebedevs	Denmark; Kenni Larsen; Peter Kildemand
2013	(Germany) Herxheim; Sandbahn Rennen	Germany; Martin Smolinski; Kevin Wölbert	Poland; Sebastian Ułamek; Norbert Kościuch	Ukraine; Andriy Karpov; Stanislav Melnichuk; Aleksandr Loktaev
2014	(Czech Republic) Divišov; Divišov Speedway	Czech Republic; Václav Milík, Jr. Eduard Krčmář	Poland; Damian Baliński; Sebastian Ułamek	Russia; Denis Gizatullin; Vitalyi Belousov
2015	(Hungary) Debrecen; Gázvezeték Complex	Poland; Dawid Lampart; Damian Baliński; Sebastian Ułamek	Russia; Grigory Laguta; Vitaly Belousov	Czech Republic; Václav Milík Jr. Eduard Krčmář
2016	(Latvia) Riga; Riga Speedway Stadium	Italy; Nicolás Covatti; Nicolas Vicentin	Denmark; Michael Jepsen Jensen; Rasmus Jensen	Latvia; Kjasts Puodžuks; Andžejs Ļebedevs
2017	(Italy) Lonigo; Santa Marina Stadium	Poland; Tobiasz Musielak; Grzegorz Zengota	Russia; Artem Laguta; Andrey Kudriashov; Viktor Kulakov	France; David Bellego; Dimitri Bergé
2018	(Denmark) Brovst; Brovst Speedway Center	Poland; Grzegorz Zengota; Jakub Jamróg; Tobiasz Musielak	Denmark; Anders Thomsen; Michael Jepsen Jensen; Thomas Jørgensen	Italy; Nicolás Covatti; Michele Paco Castagna
2019	(Russia) Balakovo; Trud Stadium	Russia; Vladimir Borodulli; Viktor Kulakov; Grigory Laguta	Czech Republic; Václav Milík Jr. Eduard Krčmář	Latvia; Andžejs Ļebedevs; Oļegs Mihailovs
2020	(Italy) Terenzano; Pista Olimpia	Poland; Jakub Jamróg; Viktor Trofimov Jr.	Latvia; Andžejs Ļebedevs; Oļegs Mihailovs; Jevgeņijs Kostigovs	France; David Bellego; Dimitri Bergé
2021	(France) Mâcon; Circuit de la Grisière	France; David Bellego; Dimitri Bergé	Poland; Jakub Jamróg; Grzegorz Zengota	Latvia; Andžejs Ļebedevs; Jevgeņijs Kostigovs
2022	(Denmark) Slangerup; Speedway Center	Denmark; Rasmus Jensen; Michael Jepsen Jensen; Jonas Seifert-Salk	Czech Republic; Václav Milík Jr. Jan Kvěch	Poland; Grzegorz Zengota; Norbert Krakowiak
2023	(Poland) Opole; Marian Spychała Stadium	Poland; Przemysław Pawlicki; Szymon Woźniak	Denmark; Rasmus Jensen; Mads Hansen	Finland; Timo Lahti; Antti Vuolas; Jesse Mustonen
2024	(Italy) Lonigo; Santa Marina Stadium	Denmark; Rasmus Jensen; Frederik Jakobsen	Poland; Bartlomiej Kowalski; Mateusz Cierniak	Great Britain; Tom Brennan; Leon Flint; Dan Thompson
2025	(Latvia) Daugavpils; Stadium Lokomotīve	Denmark; Leon Madsen; Andreas Lyager	Latvia; Andžejs Ļebedevs; Daniils Kolodinskis; Jevgeņijs Kostigovs	Czech Republic; Jan Kvěch; Adam Bednar; Václav Milík Jr.
2026	(Latvia) Grudziadz; Grudziądz Speedway Stadium	Poland; Wiktor Przyjemski; Maksymilian Pawelczak; Kevin Malkiewicz	Latvia; Andžejs Ļebedevs; Francis Gusts; Daniils Kolodinskis	Czech Republic; Jan Kvěch; Václav Milík Jr. Daniel Klima

== Classification ==
Pos	National Team	Gold	Silver	Bronze
1.	Poland	10	5	3
2.	Czech Republic	5	4	3
3.	Denmark	3	3	1
4.	Russia	1	4	4
5.	Germany	1	1	
6.	France	1		2
7.	Ukraine	1		1
	Italy	1		1
9.	Latvia		4	3
10.	Hungary		1	1
	Slovenia		1	1
12.	Croatia			1
	Finland			1
	Great Britain			1
	Total	22	22	22
