= 2016 European Pairs Speedway Championship =

Motorcycle racing competition

Seasons
- ← 2015 2017 →

The 2016 European Pairs Speedway Championship was the 13th edition of the European Pairs Speedway Championship. The final was held at the Riga Speedway Stadium in Riga, Latvia on 13 August.

The title was won by Italy for the first time.

== Final ==
Position	team	Riders	Points
1	Italy	Nicolás Covatti (11), Nicolas Vicentin (3)	14
2	Denmark	Michael Jepsen Jensen (7), Rasmus Jensen (7)	14
3	Latvia	Kjasts Puodžuks (8), Andžejs Ļebedevs (6)	14
4	Poland	Szymon Woźniak (7), Kacper Gomólski (6)	13
5	Czech Republic	Václav Milík Jr. (11), Eduard Krčmář (1)	12
6	Russia	Andrey Kudriashov (5), Sergey Logachev (4), Grigory Laguta (3)	12
7	Germany	Valentin Grobauer (2), Sandro Wassermann (2)	4

== See also ==
- 2016 Speedway European Championship
