= 2010 European Speedway Club Champions' Cup =

European motorcycle speedway event

European Speedway Club Champions' Cup
- End date: 2 October

The 2010 European Speedway Club Champions' Cup was the 13th European Speedway Club Champions' Cup season. It was organised by the European Motorcycle Union (UEM). The final took place on 2 October 2010 in Miskolc, Hungary.

The competition was primarily for Eastern European teams and only featured Polish teams from three of the 'Big four' leagues, with the British, Swedish and Danish leagues choosing not to compete.

The Cup was won by Russian SK Turbina Balakovo.

== Summary ==
- (Hungary) Miskolc
- 2 October 2010

Pos.	Club	Pts.
1	(Russia) SK Turbina Balakovo	51
2	(Hungary) Speedway Miskolc	30
3	(Poland) Falubaz Zielona Góra	24
4	(Ukraine) Shakhtar Chervonograd	15

== Final ==
- 2 October 2010
- (Hungary) Borsod Volán Stadion, Miskolc
- Referee and Jury President: Anthony Steele

Placing	Team / Rider name	Total	1	2	3	4	5	6	7	8	9	10	11	12	13	14	15	16	Pts	17	18	19	20
1	(Russia) SK Turbina Balakovo	51	2	4	6	8	11	14	14	16	19	22	24	27	30	33	36	39		42	45	48	51
1	(1) Andreas Jonsson	13				2				2				3				3	10		3
1	(2) Grzegorz Walasek	10			2				R				2				3		7	3
1	(3) Denis Gizatullin	14		2				3				3			3				11			3
1	(4) Roman Povazhny	14	2				3				3					3			11				3
1	(17) Rafał Szombierski	0																	0
2	(Hungary) Speedway Miskolc	30	3	4	7	7	8	8	10	13	15	15	18	20	21	22	24	25		27	29	29	30
2	(13) Rune Holta	5		1					2		2							-	5			R
2	(14) Norbert Magosi	9	3							3		Fx					2		8				1
2	(15) Maciej Kuciapa	6			3			Fx						-		1			4	2
2	(16) József Tabaka	7				-	1						3		1				5		2
2	(20) Nicki Pedersen	3				0								2				1	3
3	(Poland) Falubaz Zielona Góra	24	0	3	4	5	7	9	12	12	12	14	15	15	15	17	17	19		19	20	22	24
3	(5) Niels Kristian Iversen	7	F					2					1					2	5			2
3	(6) Mateusz Kowalczyk	6		3			2							X			0		5		1
3	(7) Grzegorz Zengota	10				1			3			2				2			8				2
3	(8) Łukasz Sówka	1			1					0	0				0				1	0
4	(Ukraine) Shakhtar Chervonograd	15	1	1	1	4	4	5	6	7	8	9	9	10	12	12	13	13		14	14	15	15
4	(9) Aleksandr Loktaev	2			R		0					1						R	1	1
4	(10) Zbigniew Suchecki	6				3		1			1						1		6				0
4	(11) Kirił Cukanow	1		X						1			0			0			1		0
4	(12) Rafał Trojanowski	6	1						1					1	2				5			1
Placing	Team / Rider name	Total	1	2	3	4	5	6	7	8	9	10	11	12	13	14	15	16	Pts	17	18	19	20

M - exclusion for exceeding two-minute time allowance • T - exclusion for touching the tapes • X - other exclusion • E - retired or mechanical failure • F - fell

Helmet colours were permanent for each team (Red, Blue, White and Yellow/Black). Colours in diagrams indicate gate positions:
gate A – inside	gate B	gate C	gate D – outside

== See also ==
- 2010 in sports
