= 2019 European Pairs Speedway Championship =

Motorcycle racing competition

The 2019 European Pairs Speedway Championship was the 16th edition of the European Pairs Speedway Championship. The final was held at the Trud Stadium in Balakovo, Russia on 29 August.

The title was won by Russia for the first time.

== Final ==
- Trud Stadium, Balakovo

Position	team	Riders	Points
1	Russia	Vladimir Borodulli (9), Viktor Kulakov (9), Grigory Laguta (8)	26
2	Czech Republic	Václav Milík Jr. (16), Eduard Krčmář (6)	22
3	Latvia	Andžejs Ļebedevs (17), Oļegs Mihailovs (3)	20
4	France	David Bellego (11), Dimitri Bergé (5)	16
5	Poland	Tobiasz Musielak (12), Norbert Kosciuch (2), Kacper Gomólski (2)	16
6	Young Europe	Aleksandr Kajbuszev (9), Ričards Ansviesulis (5), Patryk Rolnicki (0)	14
7	Italy	Michele Paco Castagna (8), Nicolas Vicentin (4)	12

== See also ==
- 2019 Speedway European Championship
