= 2018 European Pairs Speedway Championship =

Motorcycle racing competition

The 2018 European Pairs Speedway Championship was the 15th edition of the European Pairs Speedway Championship. The final was held at the Brovst Speedway Center in Brovst, Denmark on 1 September.

The title was won by Poland for the seventh time.

== Final ==
| Position | team | Riders | Points |
|---|---|---|---|
| 1 | Poland | Grzegorz Zengota (16), Jakub Jamróg (5), Tobiasz Musielak (3) | 24 |
| 2 | Denmark | Anders Thomsen (13), Michael Jepsen Jensen (8), Thomas Jørgensen (1) | 22 |
| 3 | Italy | Nicolás Covatti (16), Michele Paco Castagna (5) | 21 |
| 4 | Sweden | Oliver Berntzon (13), Linus Sundström (7) | 20 |
| 5 | Russia | Viktor Kulakov (10), Sergey Logachev (6) | 16 |
| 6 | Germany | Ronny Weis (10), Valentin Grobauer (0) | 10 |
| 7 | Latvia | Rudolfs Sprogis (7), Ričards Ansviesulis (2) | 9 |

== See also ==
- 2018 Speedway European Championship
