= Antonio Miranda Circuit =

Stadium in Bahía Blanca, Argentina

- Location: Bermúdez 6000, Bahía Blanca, Provincia de Buenos Aires, Argentina
- Coordinates: 38°40′46″S 62°10′14″W
- Operator: Automoto Club Bahía Blanca

Antonio Miranda Circuit is a motorcycle speedway stadium on the eastern outskirts of Bahía Blanca. It is located on Bermúdez 6000, adjacent (on the eastern side) of Autódromo Ezequiel Crisol. It is operated by the Automoto Club Bahía Blanca, who operate under the Federation called the Confederacion Argentina de Motociclismo Deportivo.

== History ==
In 2012, the stadium hosted arguably its most significant event to date, when it held the final two rounds of the 2012 Speedway Under-21 World Championship on the 3 and 10 November respectively.

The stadium also hosts rounds of both versions of the Argentine Individual Speedway Championship; the Campeonato Argentino de Speedway (the winter national championships) and the Campeonato Internacional Argentino (the summer International Championships).

The popularity of speedway in the area has increased since 2020, which has led to the construction of two large stands on the home and back straights.
