= 2017 European Pairs Speedway Championship =

Motorcycle racing competition

The 2017 European Pairs Speedway Championship was the 14th edition of the European Pairs Speedway Championship. The final was held at the Santa Marina Stadium in Lonigo, Italy on 30 September.

The title was won by Poland for the sixth time.

== Final ==
| Position | team | Riders | Points |
|---|---|---|---|
| 1 | Poland | Tobiasz Musielak (17), Grzegorz Zengota (10)) | 27 |
| 2 | Russia | Artem Laguta (10), Andrey Kudriashov (7), Viktor Kulakov (4), | 21 |
| 3 | France | David Bellego (13), Dimitri Bergé (7) | 20 |
| 4 | Denmark | Mikkel B. Andersen (11), Rasmus Jensen (4) | 15 |
| 5 | Italy | Nicolás Covatti (12), Guglielmo Franchetti (2), Michele Paco Castagna (1) | 15 |
| 6 | (United Kingdom) Great Britain | Steve Worrall (12), Ellis Perks (2) | 14 |
| 7 | Latvia | Oļegs Mihailovs (9), Jevgeņijs Kostigovs (4) | 13 |

== See also ==
- 2017 Speedway European Championship
