= 2011 European Speedway Club Champions' Cup =

European motorcycle speedway event

European Speedway Club Champions' Cup
- End date: 5 October

The 2011 European Speedway Club Champions' Cup was the 14th and last motorcycle speedway championship for clubs competing in Europe. It was organised by the European Motorcycle Union (UEM).

The competition failed following the withdrawal of the Polish teams from the competition. Throughout the 14-year history of the competition the Polish league had been the only one of the 'Big four' leagues represented, with the British, Swedish and Danish leagues choosing not to compete.

Vostok Vladivostok won the championship. SK Turbina Balakovo took part as a guest team and were not classified.

== Final ==
Pos.	Team	Pts.	Scorers
1	(Russia) Vostok Vladivostok	43	Grigory Laguta 14, Troy Batchelor 12, Artem Laguta 11, Renat Gafurov 4, Vadim Tarasenko 2
2	(Ukraine) Shakhtar Chervonograd	23	Denis Gizatullin 11, Andriy Karpov 6, Kirill Tsukanov 3, Daniil Ivanov 3
3	(Latvia) Lokomotive Daugavpils	11	Andžejs Ļebedevs 6, Vjačeslavs Giruckis 2 Jevgēņijs Karavackis 3, Kjasts Puodžuks 0
4	(Russia) SK Turbina Balakovo	43	Emil Sayfutdinov 13, Roman Povazhny 11, Magnus Zetterström 10, Ilya Chalov 9 Andrey Kudriashov ns
5	(Poland) Unia Leszno	X	withdrew
