= 2015 European Pairs Speedway Championship =

Motorcycle racing competition

Seasons
- ← 2014 2016 →

The 2015 European Pairs Speedway Championship was the 12th edition of the European Pairs Speedway Championship. The final was held at the Gázvezeték Street Sports Complex in Debrecen, Hungary on 26 September.

The title was won by Poland for the fifth time.

== Final ==
Position	team	Riders	Points
1	Poland	Dawid Lampart (14), Damian Baliński (10), Sebastian Ułamek (2)	26
2	Russia	Grigory Laguta (15), Vitaly Belousov (7)	22
3	Czech Republic	Václav Milík Jr. (16), Eduard Krčmář (4), Zdenek Holub (0)	20
4	Germany	Kai Huckenbeck (13), Valentin Grobauer (5), Tobias Busch (1)	19
5	Hungary	József Tabaka (12), Norbert Magosi (6), Sándor Tihanyi (0)	18
6	Austria	Dany Gappmaier (8), Alexander Schaaf (4)	12
7	Latvia	Oļegs Mihailovs (7), Deniss Zvorigins (1)	8

== See also ==
- 2015 Speedway European Championship
