= National Tenants' Organization (Denmark) =

Danish tenant association

- Lejernes Landsorganisation
- Abbreviation: LLO
- Formation: 30 October 1966; 59 years ago
- Headquarters: Copenhagen, Denmark
- Region served: Denmark
- Services: Housing tenants
- Chairman: Helene Toxværd
- Website: llo.dk

The National Tenants' Organization (in Danish: Lejernes Landsorganisation, abbreviated LLO) is a Danish association for residential and commercial tenants.

== History ==
In 1966, significant changes were made to housing legislation that affected tenants. It opened up the possibility of apartment subdivisions and rent increases. Previously, tenants were organized in two competing tenant organizations: the Cooperative Danish Tenants' Associations (founded 28 January 1917) and the Danmarks Lejerforbund (founded in 1941).

The attacks on the tenants' interests contributed to the two organizations coming together in 1966 and forming the Tenants' Union (LLO). This happened on 29 - 30 October 1966 at a unity congress held in Frederiksberg. The chairman of the Danish Tenants' Union, Hans Halvorsen, Frederiksberg, was elected chairman of the new joint organization. Arne Christiansen from the Cooperative Danish Tenants' Unions became deputy chairman.

The Danish Tenants' Union is a nationwide organization with local branches around the country. The organization is active in housing policy issues nationally and locally. In addition, individual tenants can seek advice and assistance regarding tenancy conditions.

In 1996, the branches in Odense, Svendborg, and Munkebo withdrew from LLO due to dissatisfaction with, among other things, top management from Copenhagen.

In 2000, the organization lost about 5,000 members due to internal disputes in the capital. They led to the establishment of the organization Bosam.

From August 2015 to January 2016 the Central Board of the LLO expelled several shop stewards from the Jutland-Funen branches, because according to the Central Board they acted against the organization's laws and statutes. The Jutland-Funen branches did not believe this. They formed the organization "Danish Tenants", which believes that the LLO violated several of the organization's own statutes. They threatened the existence of the branches' membership services in Jutland-Funen in recent years.

Prior to the congress on 27-28 October 2018, four branches of the LLO, Aarhus, Randers/Djursland, Esbjerg and Slagelse, decided to withdraw from the organization due to fears of centralizations that had been proposed before the congress. The withdrawals took effect from 1 January 2019.

At a general board meeting on 5 September 2020, the Tenants' Union excluded their branch in Næstved. Næstved was historically one of the strongest market town branches affiliated with the Tenants' Union.

An LLO director said internationals were paying too much in rent.

== External references ==
- Official website (in Danish)
