= Marcin Rempała =

Polish speedway rider

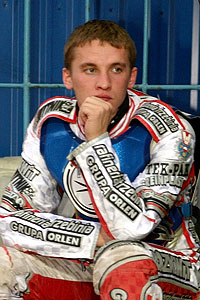
- Born: 20 November 1984 (age 42); Tarnów, Poland
- Nationality: Polish

Career history

Poland
- 2001, 2020: Rzeszów
- 2002–2008, 2010: Tarnów
- 2009: Rybnik
- 2011–2013, 2017: Opole
- 2014–2016, 2018–2019: Krosno

Sweden
- 2005: Vetlanda
- 2006: Rospiggarna

Great Britain
- 2007: Ipswich
- 2010: Berwick

Denmark
- 2010: Esbjerg

Individual honours
- 2005 - 5th place: World Under-21 Championship

Team honours
- 2005: Under-21 World Cup
- 2006: European Pairs Champion

Marcin Rempała (born 20 November 1984 in Tarnów) is a Polish former motorcycle speedway rider. He earned one international cap for the Poland national speedway team.

== Career ==
Rempała won the Team Under 21 World Championship in 2005.

Rempała first rode in Britain for the Ipswich Witches during the 2007 Elite League speedway season. Three years later, he rode for Berwick Bandits.

== Family ==
Rempała's older brothers, Jack, Grzegorz and Tomasz Rempała were also speedway riders.

== Results ==
=== World Championships ===
- Team World Championship (Speedway World Cup)
  - 2004 - (England) Poole - 4th place (7 points)
- Individual World U-21 Championship
  - 2005 - (Austria) Wiener Neustadt - 5th place (6 points)
- Team U-21 World Championship (Under-21 World Cup)
  - 2005 - (Czech Republic) Pardubice - World Champion (8 points)

=== European Championships ===
- Individual European Championship
  - 2004 - (Denmark) Holsted - 17th place (1 points as track reserve)
- European Pairs Championship
  - 2006 - (Slovenia) Lendava - European Champion (track reserve in Final)
- European Under-19 Championship
  - 2003 - (Germany) Pocking - 5th place (9 points)

=== Domestic competitions ===
- Individual Polish Championship
  - 2009 - 11th place in Quarter-Final 1
- Silver Helmet (U-21)
  - 2005 - 3rd place

== See also ==
- Poland national speedway team
