= Munkebo Speedway Center =

Motorcycle speedway stadium in Munkebo, Denmark

- Location: Garbækstoften 20, 5330 Munkebo, Denmark
- Coordinates: 55°27′32″N 10°32′12″E
- Opened: 14 August 1976 (50cc); 11 May 1985 (500cc)
- Length: 0.292 km

Munkebo Speedway Center is a motorcycle speedway facility in Munkebo, Denmark. The facility is located on the western outskirts of the town, on the Garbækstoften road, just off Garbæksvej. The center hosts the speedway team Munkebo Speedway Club, who race in the Danish Speedway League system. In addition to a standard 500cc oval track, there is a smaller 80cc track (measuring 196 metres) adjacent to the main one.

== History ==
Munkebo Motor Sport was founded on 1 December 1975 and a few months later they opened a 196-metre mini 50cc speedway track, near the Lindøj Shipyard. The first meeting held there was the 50cc Danish Moped Speedway Championship on 14 August 1976. Plans to build a 500cc track had first been explored as early as 1978 but countless issues (from funding to noise objections) had been encountered. In 1983, the 50cc track became 80cc and finally in 1984, work started on construction adjacent to the existing mini speedway set up.

The 500cc track was opened by the mayor of Munkebo, on 11 May 1985, one year before the creation of the professional Danish Speedway League or Superliga. In 1988, Munkebo Motor Sport became Munkebo Speedway Club (MSC) and in 1996 a new clubhouse was built.

In 1999, the track was selected to host the final of the Danish Individual Speedway Championship.

In 2012, the semi-finals of the European Pairs Speedway Championship were held at the track.
