= 2005 Speedway Under-21 World Championship =

European motorcycle speedway event

World Under-21 Championship
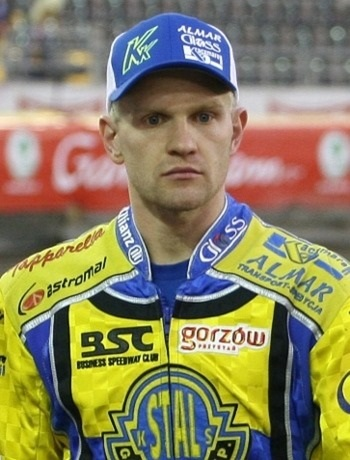
- Krzysztof Kasprzak
- Venue: Stadion Wiener Neustadt
- Location: Wiener Neustadt, Austria
- Start date: 17 September 2005

The 2005 Individual Speedway Junior World Championship was the 29th edition of the World motorcycle speedway Under-21 Championships.

The final was won by Krzysztof Kasprzak of Poland, after the meeting was stopped early after just 12 heats due to heavy rain and dangerous track conditions. Kasprzak and Tomáš Suchánek both finished on 8 points after three rides and Kasprzak was declared the winner after coin flipping. Freddie Lindgren took the bronze medal from Paweł Hlib by virtue of having two race wins from his three races.

== World final ==
- 17 September 2005
- (Austria) Stadion Wiener Neustadt, Wiener Neustadt
- only 12 heats

Placing	Rider	Total	1	2	3	4	5	6	7	8	9	10	11	12	13	14	15	16	17	18	19	20	Pts	Pos
1	(Poland) (6) Krzysztof Kasprzak	8		3				3			2												8	1
2	(Czech Republic) (15) Tomáš Suchánek	8				3			2			3											8	2
3	(Sweden) (4) Freddie Lindgren	7	1							3				3									7	3
4	(Poland) (16) Paweł Hlib	7				2				2	3												7	4
5	(Poland) (11) Marcin Rempała	6			2				3		1												6	5
6	(Sweden) (14) Antonio Lindbäck	6				1		2					3										6	6
7	(England) (8) James Wright	5		2						1			2										5	7
8	(England) (3) Edward Kennett	4	2						1				1										4	8
9	(England) (1) Daniel King	3	0				3				E												3	9
10	(Poland) (2) Krystian Klecha	3	3					0				F											3	10
11	(Sweden) (9) Jonas Davidsson	3			3		0						F										3	11
12	(Germany) (5) Thomas Stange	3		1			1					1											3	12
13	(Germany) (10) Christian Hefenbrock	3			1			1						1									3	13
14	(Poland) (12) Adrian Miedziński	2			0					F		2											2	14
15	(Germany) (13) Martin Smolinski	2				E	2							X									2	15
16	(Austria) (7) Friedrich Wallner	0		E					X					E									0	16
R1	(Germany) (R1) Mathias Schultz	0																					0	R1
R2	(Denmark) (R2) Morten Risager	0																					0	R2
Placing	Rider	Total	1	2	3	4	5	6	7	8	9	10	11	12	13	14	15	16	17	18	19	20	Pts	Pos

m - exclusion for exceeding two minute time allowance • t - exclusion for touching the tapes • x - other exclusion • e - retired or mechanical failure • f - fell • ns - non-starter • nc - non-classify

gate A - inside	gate B	gate C	gate D - outside
