= 2014 Speedway World Cup final =

2014 FIM Speedway World Cup Final
Information
- Date: 2 August 2014
- City: Bydgoszcz
- Event: 4 of 4

Stadium details
- Stadium: Polonia Stadium
- Capacity: 22,000
- Track: speedway track

SWC Results
Winner		Denmark - 38 pts
Runner-up		Poland - 37 pts
3rd place		Australia - 36 pts
4th place		Great Britain - 16 pts

The 2014 Monster Energy FIM Speedway World Cup Final was the last and final race of the 2014 edition of the Speedway World Cup. It was staged on August 2 at the Polonia Stadium in Bydgoszcz, Poland. It was won by Denmark. They beat hosts and defending champions Poland by a single point, with Australia a further point back in third.

Denmark were led to success by a stunning performance from three-time world champion Nicki Pedersen, who scored 17 of his country's 38 points. Niels-Kristian Iversen, Peter Kildemand and Mads Korneliussen completed the successful line-up. Poland and Denmark were level on 35 points apiece heading into the final heat 20 and initially Janusz Kołodziej held the advantage for the hosts, however Iversen passed him on the last corner of the last lap to steal the title for Denmark.

== Results ==
Pos.	National team	Pts.
1	Denmark	38
2	Poland	37
3	Australia	36
4	Great Britain	16

== Scores ==
(Denmark)	DENMARK	38
No	Rider Name	Pts.	Heats
1	Nicki Pedersen	17	2,3,6,3,1,2
2	Peter Kildemand	7	2,0,2,2,1
3	Mads Korneliussen	3	1,0,2,0
4	Niels-Kristian Iversen	11	2,3,2,2,2

(Poland)	POLAND	37
No	Rider Name	Pts.	Heats
1	Piotr Protasiewicz	9	3,2,2,2,0
2	Krzysztof Kasprzak	11	3,2,3,1,2
3	Janusz Kołodziej	6	3,1,1,0,1
4	Jarosław Hampel	11	3,1,1,3,3

(Australia)	AUSTRALIA	36
No	Rider Name	Pts.	Heats
1	Chris Holder	11	1,6,3,0,1
2	Darcy Ward	10	0,1,2,1,3,3
3	Jason Doyle	13	1,3,0,3,3,3
4	Troy Batchelor	2	0,2,0

(United Kingdom)	GREAT BRITAIN	16
No	Rider Name	Pts.	Heats
1	Tai Woffinden	12	2,2,1,2,3,2
2	Simon Stead	0	0,0,0,0
3	Chris Harris	4	1,1,0,1,1
4	Danny King	0	0,0,0,0,0

== See also ==
- 2014 Speedway Grand Prix
