= Viktor Trofimov Jr. =

Ukrainian speedway rider

- Born: 30 September 1999 (age 27); Rivne, Ukraine
- Nationality: Ukrainian/Polish

Career history

Ukraine
- 2015–2017: Rivne

Poland
- 2017, 2019–2020: Lublin
- 2018: Rawicz
- 2021: Rybnik
- 2022: Gdańsk
- 2023: Zielona Góra
- 2024: Piła

Individual honours
- 2015: Ukraine national champion

Team honours
- 2020: European Pairs champion
- 2020: World U21 team champion

Viktor Trofimov Jr. (born 30 September 1999) is an international motorcycle speedway rider from Ukraine and later Poland. He was the champion of Ukraine in 2015.

== Speedway career ==
Trofimov was born in Rivne, Ukraine, the son of Vladimir Trofimov and grandson Viktor Trofimov (his sporting hero).

Trofimov pursued a career in speedway following in the footsteps of his father and grandfather, who were born in the Soviet Union but had significant links with Ukraine since the dissolution of the Soviet Union, riding for the Rivne speedway team. Trofimov was the champion of Ukraine, winning the national championship in 2015. In 2016, he joined Kraków Speedway.

In 2017, Trofimov started riding in the Team Speedway Polish Championship, eventually moving to live in Leszno and taking out a Polish licence.

In 2020, Trofimov won the World U21 team championship with Poland at the Outrup Speedway Center in Denmark and then just one month later won the gold medal with Poland at the European Pairs Speedway Championship with Jakub Jamróg at the Pista Olimpia in Terenzano.

In 2023, Trofimov was involved in a serious racing crash that left him with a broken arm.
