= Mototrek Hirnyk =

Stadium in Chervonohrad, Ukraine

- Location: Chervonohrad, Lviv Oblast, Ukraine
- Coordinates: 50°22′56″N 24°14′24″E
- Length: 0.366 km

Chervonohrad Speedway Stadium or Mototrek Hirnyk is a motorcycle speedway stadium in the east of Chervonohrad. It is located on the Pushkina Street. It is one of three active tracks in Ukraine, along with SKA Stadium and Rivne Speedway Stadium.

== History ==
The venue hosted the speedway team Shakhtar Chervonograd who competed in several European Speedway Club Champions' Cup events.

The stadium has hosted significant speedway events including semi-finals of the 2010 Team Speedway Junior European Championship and 2011 Team Speedway Junior European Championship, a qualifying round of the 2011 Speedway Under-21 World Championship, a semi final of the 2012 Speedway Under-21 World Championship and a semi-final of the 2013 Speedway European Championship.

In 2023, the track hosted an event to celebrate Coal Miner's Day in Ukraine and support the Armed Forces of Ukraine engaged in action against the Russian invasion of Ukraine.

== Shakhtar Chervonograd ==
The speedway team Shakhtar Chervonograd competed in the European Speedway Club Champions' Cup in 2010 and 2011. The team also participated in the 2008 Russian Team Speedway Championship.

League competition

- 2010 - 4th place
- 2011 - runner-up
