= Guglielmo Franchetti =

Italian speedway rider (born 1985)

- Born: 5 October 1985 (age 41); Terenzano, Italy

Career history
- 2008-2009: Berwick Bandits
- 2011-2012: Plymouth Devils

Individual honours
- 2009, 2012: Italian National Champion

Guglielmo Franchetti or Gino Franchetti (born 5 October 1985) is an Italian former motorcycle speedway rider.

== Career ==
Franchetti was a member of Italy national speedway team, earning five international caps and was twice Italian National Champion in 2009 and 2012.

Franchetti rode in the British leagues for Berwick Bandits during the 2008 Premier League speedway season and 2009 Premier League speedway season. He then rode for the Plymouth Devils in 2011 and 2012.

In 2017, Franchetti led the Argentine Individual Speedway Championship standings and finished fourth in the Italian Championship.

== Honours ==
=== World Championships ===
- Team World Championship (Speedway World Cup)
  - 2006 - 4th place in Qualifying round 2 (3 points)
  - 2007 - 4th place in Qualifying round 2 (8 points)
  - 2009 - 3rd place in Qualifying round 1 (7 points)
  - 2010 - 4th place in Qualifying round 2 (7 points)

=== European Championships ===
- Individual European Championship
  - 2007 - 14th place in Semi-Final A (4 points)
  - 2009 - 12th place in Qualifying Round 3
- European Pairs Championship
  - 2004 - 7th place in Semi-Final 1 (2 points)
  - 2007 - (Italy) Terenzano - 7th place (3 points)
  - 2009 - 3rd place in Semi-Final
- European Club Champions' Cup
  - 2007 - 2nd place in Semi-Final 1 (8 points)

=== Italian Championships ===
  - 2009 Italian Speedway Championship' - 1st place
  - 2012 Italian Speedway Championship' - 1st place

== See also ==
- Italy national speedway team
- Speedway Grand Prix of Italy
