= Michele Castagna =

Australian disability advocate (1944–2016)

Michele Winifred Castagna OAM (1944 – 17 September 2016) was an Australian disability advocate who made a significant contribution to disability services in Alice Springs; for which she received an Order of Australia medal. She is also a former alderman with Alice Springs Town Council and served from 1984–1992.

== Early life ==
Castagna was born in Italy and she migrated to Australia with her parents in 1947. In Australia the Castagna family worked on a remote mica mine, approx. 250 km from Alice Springs. The family were very poor and slept head-to-toe in the same bed.

In 1952, when boarding at the Our Lady of the Sacred Heart Convent School, Castagna contracted polio and was the first case of polio to be admitted to the Alice Springs Hospital, although an epidemic of the virus would follow, and she was soon transferred to Adelaide by the Royal Flying Doctor Service. Polio caused Castagna to become a Quadriplegic.

Following her recovery from the virus, Castagna was placed in the 'Somerton Crippled Home' where she would stay for seven years; her only regular visit hear was her grandfather once a fortnight while, due to the expense, her parents were only able to visit every two years. Her care in this home was impersonal and she felt isolated and this gave her a passion for disability advocacy.

It was intended that Castagna would remain in care for the rest of her life, she was regularly told that she would die before she turned 30, but, with the intervention of Don Broad, her physiotherapist she was allowed to come back to Central Australia, where her family were now living in Alice Springs to live with them.

== Career ==
Upon returning to Alice Springs Castagna started working at the Sunny Centre (now known as Acacia Hill School), which caters for students with intellectual and physical disabilities. Castagna worked with children with Down Syndrome. A local club, the Quota Club, assisted Castagna and organised volunteers to drive her to and from work. The Quota Club was eventually able to give her a motorised wheelchair; Castagna said this was life changing:

That's when life began, when I got the motorised chair. It was the beginning for me, of a new life. It was my first motorised vehicle - a very primitive chair in terms of what chairs are capable of doing today, but it was a freedom machine which opened up a new vista, a new life. It also challenged me to use a lot of skills I had but didn't know I had or that I was capable of.

— Michele Castagna, Icons of the Territory

Castagna spent five years working at the Sunny Centre before being appointed the Coordinator of disability services for the Northern Territory in 1983.

In addition to her coordinator role, Castagna became an Alice Springs Town Council in 1984 and served until 1992, when she decided not to run again. She was the first alderman with a disability elected and following being an alderman continued to serve on the Council's Access Advisory Committee.

Castagna also served on a number of other boards and community groups; including:

- Being Chairperson of the Multicultural Community Services
- Convener of the Catholic Church of Refugees; aiming to bring Sudanese refugees to Australia
- Chaired the Arts Access Central Australia
- Chairperson for InCite (Alice Springs)
- Founding member of ACROD, and from 1992 the chair or what was now called the NDS NT Committee
- Chairperson of the Australian Catholic Disability Council

Throughout her life Castagna remained a strong catholic and, in Alice Springs, was an active member of Our Lady of the Sacred Heart parish; where she sang in the choir

== Later life ==
Castagna died in 2016, at the age of 72, and was mourned by many.

== Awards ==
- In 1988 Castagna received the Order of Australia Medal (OAM) for services to people with disabilities in Alice Springs.
- In 2014 Castagna was awarded a Certificate of Recognition from Arts Access Australia.
- In 2015 Castagna was a state finalist to become Senior Australian of the Year.
- In 2016 Castagna was awarded the NT Arts Access Award for Excellence in Inclusive Arts Practice.
