= Facundo Albin =

Argentine speedway rider

- Born: 27 October 1992 (age 34); Daireaux, Buenos Aires Province
- Nationality: Argentinian

Career history

Great Britain
- 2013: Sheffield Tigers

Poland
- 2019: Kolejarz Rawicz

Individual honours
- 2018: Argentinian Champion

Facundo Albin (born 27 October 1992) is an Argentine speedway rider who was Argentinian Champion in 2018.

== Career ==
Albin was born in Daireaux, Buenos Aires Province in 1992. He took up speedway at the age of eight, initially riding 50cc bikes, and going on to become a junior champion in the 200cc class.

After moving up to the senior levels, Albin won a round in the Argentine championship in 2011.

Albin competed in the World Under-21 Championship in 2012, getting a wildcard to compete in the two rounds held in Argentina, and finishing in 21st place overall. Due to his commitments riding in Europe, he missed the first four of nine rounds of the Argentine championship in 2012, but still finished in fifth place overall.

In 2012, Albin moved to Berwick-upon-Tweed, England in an attempt to further his career in Europe, and signed a pre-contract agreement with Berwick Bandits, although he didn't get a place in their 2013 team and was released from the contract.

In December 2012, Albin signed for and rode for Sheffield Tigers in the 2013 British Premier League season.

In 2018, Albin won the Argentine Championship. In 2019, he rode for Kolejarz Rawicz in the Polish Speedway Second League.
