= Munkebo =

- Town
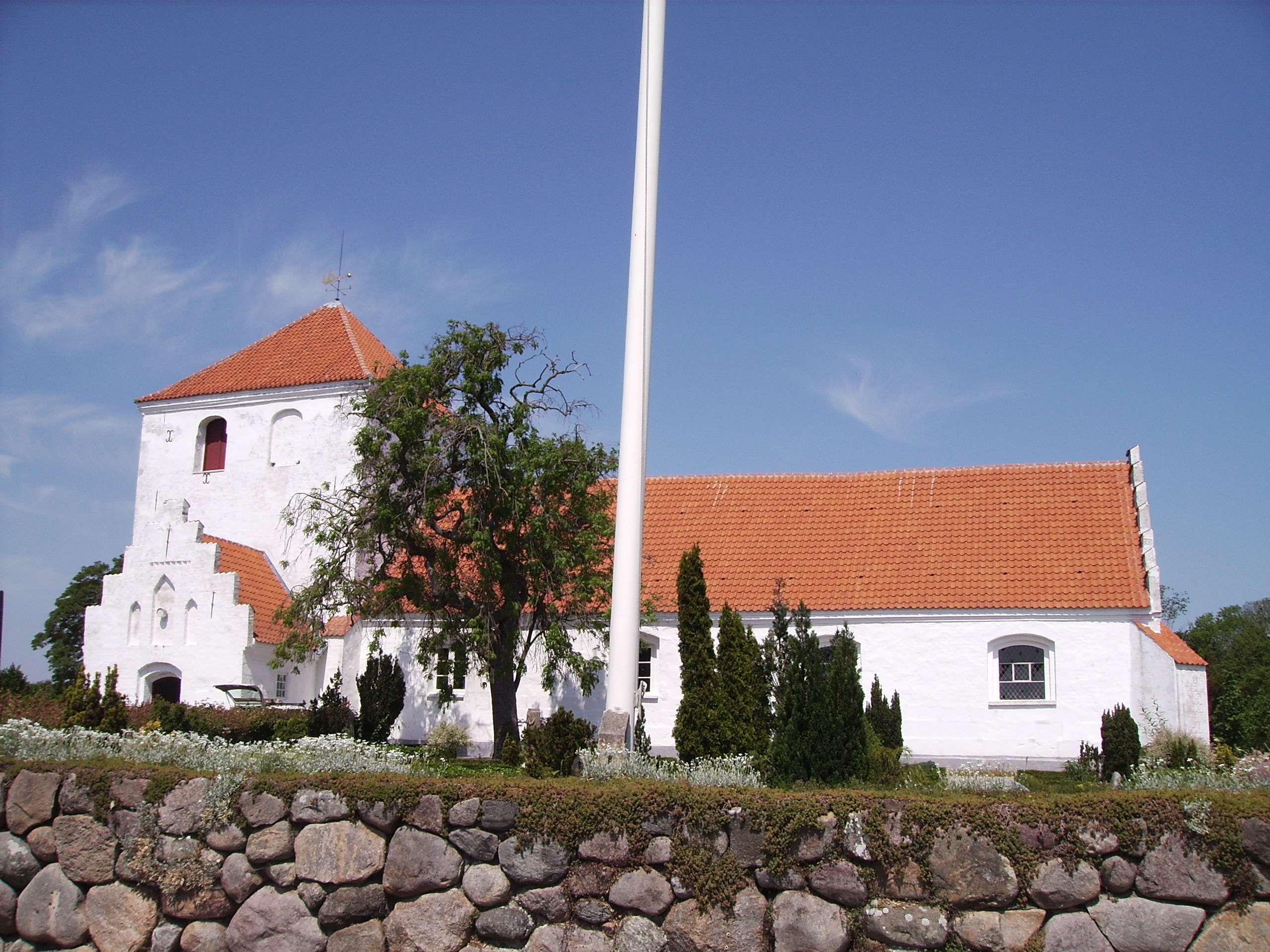
- Munkebo Church, Munkebo Parish, Bjerge Herred, Odense County, Denmark (Danish Church)

- Location in Denmark Munkebo (Region of Southern Denmark)
- Coordinates: 55.4602°N 10.5560°E
- Country: Denmark
- Region: Southern Denmark
- Municipality: Kerteminde

Area
  - Urban: 3.84 km^{2} (1.48 sq mi)

Population (2026)
  - Urban: 5,538
  - Urban density: 1,440/km^{2} (3,740/sq mi)
  - Gender: 2,816 males and 2,722 females
- Time zone: UTC+1 (CET)
  - Summer (DST): UTC+2 (CEST)
- Postal code: DK-5330 Munkebo

Munkebo is a town in central Denmark, located in Kerteminde Municipality in the Region of Southern Denmark on the island of Funen. It was also the site of the municipal council of the abolished Munkebo Municipality. The town had a population of 5,538 as of 1 January 2026.

== Trade ==
Odense Steel Shipyard was located in Munkebo.

== Sport ==
Munkebo Speedway Club is a motorcycle speedway club located at the Munkebo Speedway Center, on the western outskirts of Munkebo, on Garbækstoften 20.

== Notable people ==
- Morten Lindberg (born 1965 in Munkebo–2019) also known as "Master Fatman", was a Danish media personality, comedian, disc jockey, film director, and singer
- Casper Christensen (born 1968 in Munkebo) a Danish comedian.
