= Trud Stadium (Balakovo) =

Stadium in Balakovo, Russia

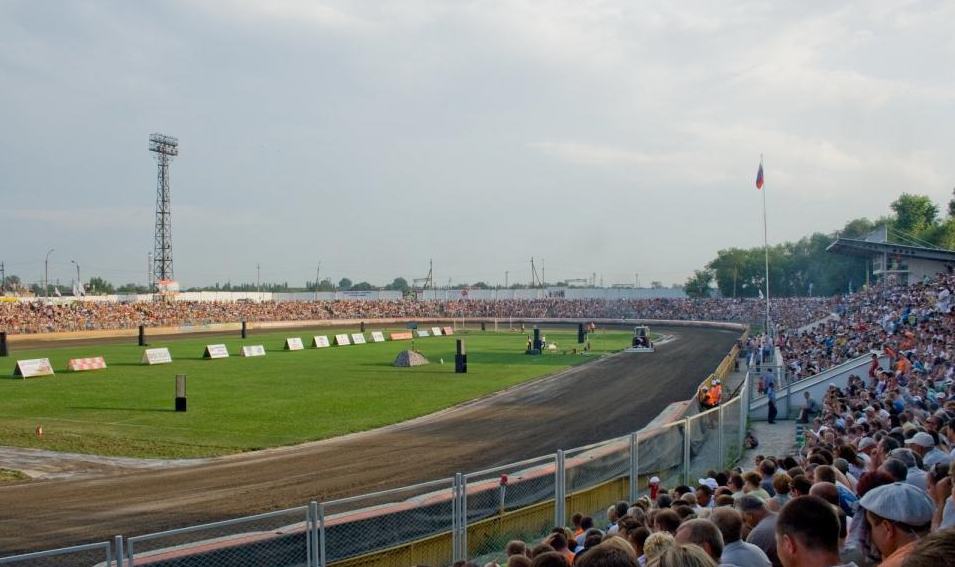
- Location: Sovetskaya Ulitsa, Balakovo, Saratov Oblast, Russia, 413855
- Coordinates: 52°00′37″N 47°45′52″E
- Opened: 1963
- Length: 0.38 km (0.24 mi)

Trud Stadium (Russian: Стадион Труд) is a sports stadium in Balakovo. It is located south west of the centre of the city, on the south side of the Volga. The stadium is primarily used for motorcycle speedway and the Speedway Club Turbina Balakovo race at the stadium. The track circumference is 380 metres.

== History ==
The stadium opened in 1963 and was the venue for qualifying rounds of the Speedway World Championship in 1966 and 1967 and the qualifying round of the Speedway World Team Cup in 1973 and 1975. The venue was also chosen for multiple Russian Individual Speedway Championship finals.

More recently the stadium held the final of the 2011 Team Speedway Junior World Championship, a 2018 European Championship qualifier and the final of the 2019 European Pairs Speedway Championship In preparation for the 2019 event, new floodlights were installed.

Since 2022, the stadium has been restricted to domestic use following the Fédération Internationale de Motocyclisme ban on Russian motorcycle riders, teams, officials, and competitions, as a result of the 2022 Russian invasion of Ukraine.

== Turbina Balakovo ==
The speedway team Turbina Balakovo race in the Russian league and also competed in the European Speedway Club Champions' Cup in 2010 and 2011. They won the competition in 2010.
