= Argentine Individual Speedway Championship =

Motorcycle speedway championship

- Sport: Motorcycle speedway
- Founded: 1930
- Most titles: Horacio Ceferino Ilacqua (10)

The Argentine Individual Speedway Championship is a motorcycle speedway championship held each year to determine the Argentine national champion. The event is held in the winter and also known as the Winter Championships.

An additional championship takes place where overseas riders participate and is called the International Championship Series. The event is held in the summer and also known as the Summer Championships.

== Winners ==
Year	National Championship (Campeonato Argentino de Speedway); Winter championships	International Championship (Campeonato Internacional Argentino); Summer championships
1930	Robert Sigrand	
1931	Juan Pagano	
1934	Juan Pagano	
1936	Juan Salatino	
1937	Juan Salatino	
1938	Juan Salatino	
1939	Juan Salatino	
1947	José Milosi	
1948	José Milosi	
1949	Oscar Santostefano	
1950	Oscar Santostefano	
1951	José Neubauer (Aut)	
1952	Oscar Santostefano	
1953	José Neubauer (Aut)	
1954	Oscar Santostefano	
1955	José Neubauer (Aut)	
1956	Hector Santin	
1957	Hector Santos Ilacqua	
1958	Edgar Castellanos	
1960	Raul Sarda	
1962	Edgar Castellanos	
1966	José Vallonel	
1967	Antonio Miranda	
1968	Horacio Ceferino Ilacqua	
1969	Horacio Ceferino Ilacqua	
1970	Horacio Ceferino Ilacqua	
1971	Horacio Ceferino Ilacqua	
1972	Horacio Ceferino Ilacqua	
1973	Horacio Ceferino Ilacqua	
1974	Horacio Ceferino Ilacqua	
1975	Horacio Ceferino Ilacqua	
1976	Horacio Ceferino Ilacqua	
1977	Horacio Ceferino Ilacqua	
1979	Juan Carlos Curzio	
1980	Juan Carlos Curzio	
1981	Giuseppe Marzotto (Ita)	
1982		Walter Grussmuller (Aut)
1983		Juan Carlos Curzio
1984		Matias Ferreras
1985		Juan Carlos Curzio
1986		Heinrich Schatzer (Aut)
1987		Peter Hehlert (Ger)
1988		Louis Alberto Vallejos
1989		Louis Alberto Vallejos
1990		Louis Alberto Vallejos
1991		Louis Alberto Vallejos
1992		Heinrich Schatzer (Aut)
1993		Louis Alberto Vallejos
1994		Louis Alberto Vallejos
1995		Louis Alberto Vallejos
1996		Zoltán Adorján (Hun)
1997		Marcel Gerhard (Swi)
1998		Louis Alberto Vallejos
1999		Armando Castagna (Ita)
2000		Emiliano Sanchez
2001		Antonín Šváb Jr. (Cze)
2002		Emiliano Sanchez
2003		Carlos Silva
2004	Lisandro Husman	Louis Alberto Vallejos
2005	Mario Arriaga	Lisandro Husman
2006	Lucas Allende	Lisandro Husman
2007	Alejandro Ruiz	Manuel Hauzinger (Aut)
2008	Matias Lopez	Nicolás Covatti
2009	Matias Lopez	Kyle Legault (Can)
2010	Martin Albanese	Adrian Rymel (Cze)
2011	Facundo Albin	Norbert Magosi (Hun)
2012	Wilson Fanfliet	Emiliano Sanchez
2013	Matias Lopez	Nicolás Covatti
2014	Jonathan Iturre	Nicolás Covatti
2015		Jakub Jamróg (Pol)
2016		Nicolás Covatti
2017		Dawid Stachyra (Pol)
2018		Facundo Albin
2019	Cristian Zubillaga	Nicolás Covatti
2020		Coty Garcia
2021	not held due to Covid-19	
2022	Coty Garcia	Paco Castagna (Ita)
2023	Oct - Nov 2023	Patryk Wojdyło (Pol)
2024	Oct - Nov 2024	Patryk Wojdyło (Pol)
