= Tomáš Suchánek =

Czech speedway rider

- Born: 7 April 1984 (age 42); Pardubice, Czechoslovakia
- Nationality: Czech

Career history

Czech Republic
- 2002, 2006: ZP Pardubice

Great Britain
- 2003: King's Lynn
- 2005: Isle of Wight
- 2005: Poole
- 2006, 2010: Redcar
- 2006: Wolverhampton
- 2007: Somerset
- 2007: Mildenhall
- 2008: Reading

Poland
- 2002, 2007: Łódź
- 2004: Lviv
- 2006: Lublin
- 2009: Miskolc

Individual honours
- 2002, 2003: Czech Under-21 Champion
- 2005: World U21 silver

Team honours
- 2001, 2002, 2004 2005, 2013, 2014 2015, 2016: Czech Div One Champion

Tomáš Suchánek (born 7 April 1984) is a Czech former motorcycle speedway rider. He earned three international caps for the Czech Republic national speedway team.

== Career ==
Suchánek was born on 7 April 1984 in Pardubice, Czechoslovakia. He first rode in the United Kingdom for the King's Lynn Stars in the Premier League in 2003 and first rode in Poland in 2002 for TŻ Łódź.

Suchánek narrowly lost out on becoming the 2005 Speedway Under-21 World Champion after the meeting was stopped early after just 12 heats due to heavy rain and dangerous track conditions. Suchánek and Krzysztof Kasprzak both finished on eeight points after three rides and Kasprzak was declared the winner after coin flipping.

Suchánek is a Czech international, representing them in the Speedway World Cup in 2005 and 2006.

In 2006, Suchánek signed for Redcar Bears, but his season was ended in September after he broke his leg riding for ZP Pardubice in a Czech Republic league match.

In 2008, Suchánek signed for the Reading Racers, before returning to Redcar Bears in 2010.
