= Nicolas Vicentin =

Italian motorcycle speedway rider

- Born: 2 May 1994 (age 32); Italy
- Nationality: Italian

Career history

Italy
- 2024: MC Lonigo

Team honours
- 2016: European Pairs Speedway Championship

Nicolas Vicentin (born 2 May 1994) is a motorcycle speedway rider from Italy. He has earned multiple international caps for the Italy national speedway team and has competed for them at the Speedway World Cup.

== Biography ==
Vicentin, came to prominence as a 17-year-old, when representing Italy during the 2011 European Pairs Speedway Championship.

Vicentin has continued to represent Italy and recorded his best success in 2016, after he won the gold medal with Nico Covatti during the 2016 European Pairs Speedway Championship.

Vicentin is an eight-time medalist of the Italian Individual Speedway Championship : silver (2013) and seven times bronze (2014, 2015, 2017, 2019, 2020, 2021, 2023). In addition, he is a two-time silver medalist of the Italian Youth Championships (2011, 2012) and a bronze medalist of the Italian Pairs Championships (2012). He also competed in the final of the Speedway Under-21 World Championship from 2012 to 2015.

Vicentin represented Italy during the 2024 Speedway of Nations.
