= Czech Republic national speedway team =

Czech Republic national motorcycle speedway team

Czech Republic
- Association: Autoklub of the Czech Republic; Autoklub České republiky
- FIM code: ACCR
- Nation colour: White, Red and Blue
- SWC wins: 0 Best result 1999 World team cup silver medal

The Czech Republic national speedway team is one of the major teams in international motorcycle speedway.

== History ==
=== As Czechoslovakia ===
The Czechoslovakia speedway team (which consisted predominantly of Czech Republic riders) competed in the inaugural Speedway World Team Cup during the 1960 Speedway World Team Cup and won the bronze medal after finishing third in the final. Throughout the history of World Team Cup, the team were regular World Cup contenders from 1960 until their final World Cup in 1992. They reached the final on fourteen occasions, winning the silver medal in 1963 and two more bronze medals in 1977 and 1979. In addition to the four medals at the World Cup, the team won a bronze medal at the Speedway World Pairs Championship.

Following the Dissolution of Czechoslovakia at the end of 1992, the riders then competed for their new speedway nations of the Czech Republic and Slovakia.

=== As the Czech Republic ===
The Czech Republic national team competed in their first World Team Cup in the 1993 Speedway World Team Cup, finishing in 7th place. The team continued to compete at the highest level, reaching the World Team Cup finals in 1997 and 1998 and winning a silver medal in 1999. From 2001, the competition was rebranded the Speedway World Cup and the Czech Republic reached their fourth and fifth finals in 2002 and 2013.

The team also won the European Pairs Speedway Championship on five occasions and have since reached the finals of the 2020 Speedway of Nations and 2022 Speedway of Nations.

== Major world medals ==
=== World Cup ===
Year	Venue	Standings (Pts)	Riders	Pts
1999	(Czech Republic); Pardubice	1. Australia (51); 2. Czech Republic (35); 3. United States (29); 4. England (29)	Aleš Dryml Jr.	10
1999	(Czech Republic); Pardubice	1. Australia (51); 2. Czech Republic (35); 3. United States (29); 4. England (29)	Bohumil Brhel	9
1999	(Czech Republic); Pardubice	1. Australia (51); 2. Czech Republic (35); 3. United States (29); 4. England (29)	Michal Makovský	8
1999	(Czech Republic); Pardubice	1. Australia (51); 2. Czech Republic (35); 3. United States (29); 4. England (29)	Antonín Kasper Jr.	8
1999	(Czech Republic); Pardubice	1. Australia (51); 2. Czech Republic (35); 3. United States (29); 4. England (29)	Antonín Šváb Jr.	0

=== European Pairs titles ===
- 2004 (Bohumil Brhel & Aleš Dryml Jr.)
- 2007 (Aleš Dryml Jr., Lukáš Dryml & Zdeněk Simota)
- 2009 (Aleš Dryml Jr. & Lukáš Dryml)
- 2010 (Aleš Dryml Jr. & Lukáš Dryml)
- 2014 (Václav Milík Jr. & Eduard Krčmář)

== International caps ==
Since the advent of the Speedway Grand Prix era, international caps earned by riders is largely restricted to international competitions, whereas previously test matches between two teams were a regular occurrence. This means that the number of caps earned by a rider has decreased in the modern era.

Rider	Caps
Bednář, Adam	
Brhel, Bohumil	15
Chlupáč, Petr	
Dryml Jr., Aleš	23
Dryml, Lukáš	20
Franc, Josef	8
Jirout, Marián	5
Kasper Jr., Antonín	15
Klíma, Daniel	
Krčmář, Eduard	
Kůs, Matěj	10
Kvěch, Jan	
Makovský, Michal	3
Milík, Jr., Václav	
Milík, Sr., Václav	
Rymel, Adrian	8
Simota, Zdeněk	5
Šitera, Filip	3
Suchánek, Tomáš	3
Šváb Jr., Antonín	4
Tomíček Jr., Luboš	4
Topinka, Tomáš	16
Vandírek, Petr	1

== See also ==
Czech Republic Individual Speedway Championship
