= Croatia national speedway team =

Croatian national motorcycle speedway team

Croatia
- Association: Croatian Motorcycle Federation; Hrvatski Motociklisticki Savez
- FIM code: HMS
- Nation colour: Red, White and Blue
- SWC wins: 0

The Croatia national speedway team are one of the teams that compete in international team motorcycle speedway.

== History ==
=== As Yugoslavia ===
The Yugoslavian speedway team (which featured riders from Croatia) first competed in the Speedway World Team Cup during the 1962 Speedway World Team Cup, finishing second in the central European round. Throughout the history of World Team Cup, the team were regular World Cup competitors from 1962 until their final World Cup in 1992. However, they were one of the weaker nations and failed to reach the latter stages of the competition. Following the breakup of Yugoslavia, the riders then competed for their new speedway nations, primarily Slovenia and Croatia.

=== As Croatia ===
The Croatian speedway team first competed in the World Team Cup at the 1995 Speedway World Team Cup, finishing in fourth place in Group C (the third tier of the World Cup).

Since 2001, Croatia have failed to qualify for the rebranded World Cup or the Speedway of Nations (introduced in 2018) and have been overshadowed by their neighbours Slovenia. Their best international result was a bronze medal at the European Pairs Speedway Championship in 2010, achieved by Dino Kovacic and Jurica Pavlič.

== International caps (as of 2022) ==
Since the advent of the Speedway Grand Prix era, international caps earned by riders is largely restricted to international competitions, whereas previously test matches between two teams were a regular occurrence. This means that the number of caps earned by a rider has decreased in the modern era.

Rider	Caps
Cvetko, Renato	
Feher, Željko	
Ilias, Jasmin	
Kovacic, Dino	
Kržnarič, Zlatko	
Kušter, Renato	
Otto, Marko	
Pavlič, Jurica	1
Radic, Tomislav	
Vargek, Ivan	
Vlah, Marko	
Žganec, Krunoslav	
