= Ukraine national speedway team =

Ukraine national motorcycle speedway team

Ukraine
- Nation colour: Blue and Yellow
- SWC Wins: 0 Best result 10th (1997, 1998)

The Ukraine national speedway team are one of the nations who compete in international motorcycle speedway.

== History ==
=== As the Soviet Union ===
The Soviet Union speedway team (which consisted predominantly of Russian riders but also Ukrainian, Latvian and Belarus riders) first competed in the 1961 edition of the Speedway World Team Cup, where they finished second in the East European round. Throughout the history of World Team Cup, the team were regular World Cup contenders from 1961 until their final World Cup in 1983. They reached the final on 12 occasions, winning the silver medal five times, in 1964, 1966, 1971, 1972, 1975 and the bronze medals three times, in 1967, 1969 and 1973.

=== As the Ukraine ===
Following the Dissolution of the Soviet Union at the end of 1991, the riders then competed for their new speedway nations of Russia, Latvia and Ukraine.

Ukraine national team first competed in the World Team Cup at the 1993 Speedway World Team Cup, finishing 4th in Group D (the fourth tier of the World Cup). In 1995, they reached Group A for the first time and finished in 12th place and in 1997 improved to 10th place, which is their best international result to date, although they repeated it in 1998.

In 2001, the World Team Cup was rebranded the Speedway World Cup and Ukraine struggled to qualify and did not enter a team due to the lack of riders available from 2001 to 2010. In 2011, they returned to World Cup and Speedway of Nations (introduced in 2018) action but have yet to make a final.

As one of the smaller speedway nations the team take part in the European Pairs Speedway Championship and won the gold medal at the 2012 European Pairs Speedway Championship, with Andriy Karpov and Aleksandr Loktaev.

== International caps ==
Since the advent of the Speedway Grand Prix era, international caps earned by riders is largely restricted to international competitions, whereas previously test matches between two teams were a regular occurrence. This means that the number of caps earned by a rider has decreased in the modern era.

Rider	Caps
Borisenko, Igor	
Fedik, Petro	
Grezin, Dmitry	
Karpov, Andrey	
Kobrin, Andriy	
Kolody, Vladimir	
Levishyn, Marko	
Loktaev, Aleksandr	
Lyatosinsky, Aleksandr	
Lysak, Vitalii	
Marko, Igor	
Melnichuk, Stanislav	
Ogorodnik, Stanislav	
Poliuhovich, Yaroslav	
Rozaliuk, Andrii	
Senko, Serhiy	
Trofimov, Vladimir	
Tsukanov, Kyryl	
Yepifanov, Igor	
Zverev, Igor	
