= Borsod Volán Stadion =

Stadium in Miskolc, Hungary

- Location: Miskolc, Budai József u. 1, 3529 Hungary
- Coordinates: 48°05′43″N 20°47′38″E
- Capacity: 7,000
- Length: 0.367 km (0.228 mi)

Borsod Volán Stadion is an association football ground and former motorcycle speedway track, located in the centre of Miskolc.

== Football ==
Miskolci AK played their football matches at the stadium but now Borsod Volán SE play there.

== Speedway ==
The stadium hosted the Speedway Miskolc speedway team that competed in the Hungarian leagues before moving to the Team Speedway Polish Championship from 2006 to 2010.

The stadium hosted a large number of major events, including nine rounds of the Speedway World Team Cup and the Speedway World Cup in 1974, 1977, 1979, 1982, 1984, 1987, 2006, 2008 and 2013 respectively. It has also staged rounds of the Speedway World Pairs Championship in 1976, 1980 and 1993 and the Continental Speedway final in 1995.
