= Jakub Jamróg =

Polish speedway rider

- Born: 24 June 1991 (age 35); Tarnów, Poland
- Nationality: Polish
- Website: Official website

Career history

Poland
- 2009–2012, 2017-2018: Tarnów
- 2013–2016: Łódź
- 2019: Wrocław
- 2020: Lublin
- 2021-2022: Gdańsk
- 2024: Rybnik
- 2025: Krosno

Sweden
- 2015: Masarna
- 2019: Vetlanda
- 2021-2022: Piraterna
- 2024: Rospiggarna
- 2025: Smederna

Great Britain
- 2015: Coventry

Denmark
- 2013: Outrup
- 2017: Slangerup
- 2018: Holsted
- 2023: Esbjerg

Individual honours
- 2015: Argentinian Champion

Jakub Jamróg (born 24 June 1991) is a Polish speedway rider.

== Career ==
Born in Tarnów, Jamróg began his career with local team Unia Tarnów who he rode for between 2009 and 2012, before signing for Orzeł Łódź in 2013.

In 2015, Jamróg won the Argentine Championship and later signed to ride for Coventry Bees in the Elite League, although he was dropped before the season started after disappointing performances in pre-season meetings.

Jamróg also rode for Masarna in the Swedish Elitserien and AK Slaný in the Czech league. In 2002, he rode for Piraterna.
