= Aleksandr Loktaev =

Ukrainian speedway rider

- Born: January 10, 1994 (age 32); Balakovo, Russia
- Nationality: Ukrainian

Career history

Russia
- 2009: Balakovo
- 2011: Togliatt

Poland
- 2010, 2012, 2014-2016: Zielona Góra
- 2011: Rybnik
- 2013, 2025: Bydgoszcz
- 2017–2018, 2020–2021: Łódź
- 2019: Ostrów
- 2023–2024: Poznań

Denmark
- 2010–2013: Holstebro
- 2019: Fjelsted
- 2021: Region Varde

Sweden
- 2012: Örnarna
- 2013: Hammarby
- 2014: Dackarna
- 2019: Masarna
- 2021: Smederna

Individual honours
- 2025: Criterium of Aces

Aleksandr Dmitrievich Loktaev or Oleksandr Dmytrovych Loktaev (Ukrainian: Олександр Дмитрович Локтаєв, born 10 January 1994) is a motorcycle speedway rider from Ukraine.

== Career ==
Loktaev first rode in Poland for Falubaz Zielona Góra in the 2010 Polish speedway season. In 2010, he qualified for the 2010 Individual Speedway Junior World Championship Semi-Final One but one week before the Semi-Final, Loktaev was injured in a Danish Speedway League match between Holstebro and Vojens. He was replaced by track reserve Simon Nielsen.

In 2011, Loktaev represented Ukraine national speedway team during the 2011 Speedway World Cup Qualification and then competed in two more World Cups in 2012 and 2013. He was also part of Ukraine team that returned to the international stage to compete in the 2018 Speedway of Nations and has since ridden in the 2021 Speedway of Nations.

Loktaev had ridden in Poland every year since 2010, with the exception of 2022. For the 2023 season he joined PSŻ Poznań. In 2024, Loktaev was unable to join his Swedish team Vetlanda because he was stuck in Ukraine due to the Russian invasion of Ukraine.

In 2025, Loktaev joined Polonia Bydgoszcz who he had ridden for in 2013 and secured a shock victory by winning the Criterium of Aces.

== Results ==
=== World team Championships ===
- 2011 Speedway World Cup - qualification round
- 2012 Speedway World Cup - qualification round
- 2013 Speedway World Cup - qualification round
- 2018 Speedway of Nations - Race off
- 2021 Speedway of Nations - 2nd semi final

=== U-21 World Championship ===
- 2010 World U21 Championships - injured before the Semi-Final One

=== Domestic competitions ===
- Team Polish Championship (Polish league)
  - 2010 - for Zielona Góra
- Individual Under-21 Russian Championship
  - 2009 - (Russia) Tolyatti - Runner-up (14 pts)
- Individual Under-21 Ukrainian Championship
  - 2009 - three events - 4th placed (23 pts in two events only)

== See also ==
- Ukraine national under-21 speedway team
