= Slovenia national speedway team =

Slovenian national motorcycle speedway team

Slovenia
- Nation colour: Red, White and Green
- SWC Wins: 0 Best result European Pairs silver medal

The Slovenia national speedway team are one of the teams that compete in international team motorcycle speedway.

== History ==
=== As Yugoslavia ===
The Yugoslavian speedway team (which featured riders from Slovenia) first competed in the Speedway World Team Cup during the 1962 Speedway World Team Cup, finishing second in the central European round. Throughout the history of World Team Cup, the team were regular World Cup competitors from 1962 until their final World Cup in 1992. However, they were one of the weaker nations and failed to reach the latter stages of the competition. Following the breakup of Yugoslavia, the riders then competed for their new speedway nations, primarily Croatia and Slovenia.

=== As Slovenia ===
The Slovenian speedway team first competed in the World Team Cup at the 1994 Speedway World Team Cup, winning Group C (the third tier of the World Cup). In 1997, they gained promotion to Group A and just missed out on their first World final.

Since 2001, Slovenia have performed well in the World Cup and the Speedway of Nations (introduced in 2018) but have yet to qualify for their first final. Their best international result to date has been winning two medals at the European Pairs Speedway Championship (a bronze in 2005 and a silver in 2006), the medallists were Matej Žagar, Izak Šantej and Jernej Kolenko respectively.

== International caps (as of 2022) ==
Since the advent of the Speedway Grand Prix era, international caps earned by riders is largely restricted to international competitions, whereas previously test matches between two teams were a regular occurrence. This means that the number of caps earned by a rider has decreased in the modern era.

Rider	Caps
Čonda, Aleksander	6
Doilnar, Aleš	
Duh, Matija	
Ferjan, Matej	8
Gregorič, Maks	7
Grmek, Anže	
Ivačič, Matic	
Klenovsek, Primoz	
Klimkovsky, Primož	
Kolenko, Jernej	11
Kovacić, Ziga	
Kraljic, Ales	
Legan, Primož	
Leske, Gerhard	
Omerzel, Krešo	
Pečnik, Jernej	
Peterca, Martin	5
Pintar, Gregor	
Šantej, Izak	
Škorja, Nick	
Štojs, Denis	
Šustersič, Tomas	
Voldrih, Matic	
Žagar, Matej	16

== See also ==
- Slovenian Individual Speedway Championship
- Speedway Grand Prix of Slovenia
