= Latvia national speedway team =

Latvian national motorcycle speedway team

Latvia
- SWC Wins: 0 Best result World Cup/Speedway of Nations; 6th place (2013, 2017, 2021)

The Latvia national speedway team is one of the nations that compete in international motorcycle speedway.

== History ==
=== As the Soviet Union ===
The Soviet Union speedway team (which was composed predominantly of Russian riders but also Ukrainian, Latvian and Belarus riders) first competed in the 1961 edition of the Speedway World Team Cup, where they finished second in the East European round. Throughout the history of World Team Cup, the team were regular World Cup contenders from 1961 until their final World Cup in 1983. They reached the final on 12 occasions, winning the silver medal five times, in 1964, 1966, 1971, 1972, 1975 and the bronze medals three times, in 1967, 1969 and 1973.

=== As Latvia ===
Following the Dissolution of the Soviet Union at the end of 1991, the riders then competed for their new speedway nations of Russia, Ukraine and Latvia.

The Latvian national team first competed in the World Team Cup at the 1992 Speedway World Team Cup, finishing 4th in Group D (the fourth tier of the World Cup). In 1994, they progressed to Group B for the first time and in 1997, competed in Group A for the first time. In 1998, they finished in 9th place, was their best international result at the time.

In 2001, the World Team Cup was rebranded the Speedway World Cup and Latvia struggled to progress to the main round. However in 2013, they finally progressed to the main round after winning their qualifying round group and being eliminated in the race off, which meant a sixth place finish. They repeated the feat in 2017.

In 2021, Latvia reached their first major final at the Speedway of Nations and as one of the smaller speedway nations the team take part in the European Pairs Speedway Championship, where they have won two silver medals (2012, 2020) and three bronze medals (2016, 2019, 2021).

== Major world finals ==
=== Speedway of Nations ===
| Year | Venue | Standings (Pts) | Riders | Pts |
|---|---|---|---|---|
| 2021 | (England); Manchester; National Speedway Stadium | 1. (United Kingdom) Great Britain (64+6+5); 2. Poland (74+4); 3. Denmark (68+3); 4. Australia (49); 5. France (47); 6. Latvia (42); 7. Sweden (30) | | |
| 2021 | (England); Manchester; National Speedway Stadium | 1. (United Kingdom) Great Britain (64+6+5); 2. Poland (74+4); 3. Denmark (68+3); 4. Australia (49); 5. France (47); 6. Latvia (42); 7. Sweden (30) | Andžejs Ļebedevs | 32 |
| 2021 | (England); Manchester; National Speedway Stadium | 1. (United Kingdom) Great Britain (64+6+5); 2. Poland (74+4); 3. Denmark (68+3); 4. Australia (49); 5. France (47); 6. Latvia (42); 7. Sweden (30) | Oļegs Mihailovs | 8 |
| 2021 | (England); Manchester; National Speedway Stadium | 1. (United Kingdom) Great Britain (64+6+5); 2. Poland (74+4); 3. Denmark (68+3); 4. Australia (49); 5. France (47); 6. Latvia (42); 7. Sweden (30) | Francis Gusts | 2 |
| 2024 | (England); Manchester; National Speedway Stadium | 1. (United Kingdom) Great Britain (35+5+7); 2. Australia (36+2); 3. Sweden (27+4); 4. Germany (26); 5. Poland (24); 6. Denmark (21); 7. Latvia (20) | Andžejs Ļebedevs | 12 |
| 2024 | (England); Manchester; National Speedway Stadium | 1. (United Kingdom) Great Britain (35+5+7); 2. Australia (36+2); 3. Sweden (27+4); 4. Germany (26); 5. Poland (24); 6. Denmark (21); 7. Latvia (20) | Daniils Kolodinskis | 6 |
| 2024 | (England); Manchester; National Speedway Stadium | 1. (United Kingdom) Great Britain (35+5+7); 2. Australia (36+2); 3. Sweden (27+4); 4. Germany (26); 5. Poland (24); 6. Denmark (21); 7. Latvia (20) | Jevgeņijs Kostigovs | 2 |

== International caps ==
Since the advent of the Speedway Grand Prix era, international caps earned by riders is largely restricted to international competitions, whereas previously test matches between two teams were a regular occurrence.

| Rider | Caps |
|---|---|
| Biznya, Aleksandr | |
| Bogdanovs, Maksims | |
| Brauceys, Yury | |
| Giruckis, Vjačeslavs | |
| Gusts, Francis | |
| Ivanov, Aleksandrs | |
Karavackis, Jevgēņijs
| Kokin, Nikolajs | |
| Koroļevs, Andrejs | |
| Kostigovs, Jevgeņijs | |
| Kurmis, Davis | |
| Ļebedevs, Andžejs | |
| Mihailovs, Oļegs | |
| Paura, Leonīds | |
| Paura, Stanislav | |
| Puodžuks, Kjasts | 9 |
| Popovičs, Denis | |
| Sokolov, Valery | |
Voronkov, Vladimir
