= Eduard Krčmář =

Czech speedway rider

- Born: 26 March 1996 (age 30); Slaný, Czech Republic
- Nationality: Czech

Career history

Czech Republic
- 2022–2024: Slaný

Great Britain
- 2015: Swindon Robins

Poland
- 2014: Rawicz
- 2015–2016: Gdańsk
- 2017–2018: Gniezno
- 2019: Poznań
- 2020: Krosno
- 2022–2023: Rzeszów

Individual honours
- 2020: Czech champion

Eduard Krčmář (born 26 March 1996) is a Czech motorcycle speedway rider. He is a member of the Czech Republic national speedway team

== Speedway career ==
Krčmář began riding in Poland in 2014 for Kolejarz Rawicz.

Krčmář rode in the top tier of British Speedway riding for the Swindon Robins in the 2015 Elite League. He is a three-time finalist in the 2014 Individual Speedway Junior World Championship, 2016 Individual Speedway Junior World Championship and 2017 Individual Speedway Junior World Championship.

Krčmář was champion of the Czech Republic after winning the Czech Republic Championship in 2020 and rode for the Czech Republic during the 2024 Speedway of Nations (world team championship).
