= Nicolás Covatti =

Argentine-Italian motorcycle speedway rider

- Born: 19 June 1988 (age 38); Coronel Pringles, Argentina
- Nationality: Argentinian & Italian

Career history

Great Britain
- 2012–2014: Birmingham
- 2014: Sheffield
- 2015–2018, 2020: Ipswich
- 2018–2019: Somerset
- 2019: Poole
- 2020: Kent
- 2024: Plymouth

Denmark
- 2015: Fjelsted
- 2024: Region Varde

Individual honours
- 2008, 2013 2014, 2016 2019: Argentine National Champion
- 2013, 2015 2016, 2019 2020, 2021 2023: Italian National Champion

Team honours
- 2019: SGB Championship Fours

Nicolás Covatti (born 19 June 1988) is an Argentine and Italian motorcycle speedway rider. He rides under an Italian licence and qualifies for the Italian national team and is a seven times national champion of Italy and five times national champion of Argentina.

== Biography ==
Born in Coronel Pringles, Argentina, Covatti first came to the attention of the speedway public when he raced in the 2012 Speedway Grand Prix of Italy and was then signed up to ride for the Birmingham Brummies in the Elite League just days later. He continued to ride for Birmingham the following year in the Elite League but suffered a broken wrist while riding as a wildcard in the Italian Grand Prix and lost his place; He was not included in the team for the 2014 season. After the team made a poor start to the season, Covatti returned to Birmingham in May, replacing the British rider Edward Kennett. With the Brummies folding during the season, Covatti joined Premier League team Sheffield Tigers in August.

Also in 2014, Covatti represented Italy in the Speedway World Cup. He was given a wildcard entry to the GP Challenge in Lonigo, and narrowly missed out on qualification for the 2015 SGP series, finishing in fifth place.

A third consecutive Italian Championship was denied in 2017 after a second place finish.

In 2018, Covatti signed again for the Ipswich Witches at the beginning of the season and then later in the season, he signed for Somerset Rebels after the controversial departure of Charles Wright. He was part of the Somerset team that won the SGB Championship Fours, which was held on 23 June 2019, at the East of England Arena.

In 2023, Covatti won his seventh individual national championship. He joined the Plymouth Gladiators for the 2024 season but suffered a serious setback after breaking his leg and arm in the 2024 Argentinian International Speedway Championship. He did however represent Italy during the 2024 Speedway of Nations.

== See also ==
- Italy national speedway team
- List of Speedway Grand Prix riders
