= Hungarian Individual Speedway Championship =

Annual Hungarian motorcycle speedway individual national championship

- Sport: Motorcycle speedway
- Founded: 1949
- Most titles: Zoltán Adorján (13)

The Hungarian Individual Speedway Championship is the annual motorcycle speedway individual championship organised by the HZM.

== Past Winners ==
Year	Winners	Runner-up	3rd place
1949	János Kesjár	Károly Domján	Károly Gutschy
1950	Károly Domján	András Krampfhardt	István Veres
1951	Sándor Lévai		
1952	Sándor Lévai		
1953	Sándor Lévai		
1954	Sándor Lévai		
1955	Sándor Lévai		
1956	Sándor Lévai		
1957	László Nándori	Lajos Vörös	Tibor Heger
1958	Lajos Vörös	Aurél Zeke	László Nándori
1959	Lajos Vörös	István Dajka	István Pásztor
1960	Lajos Vörös	József Perge	Pál Bato
1961	István Dajka	István Pásztor	Pál Perényi
1962	István Dajka	Ferenc Radácsi	István Pásztor
1963	Ferenc Radácsi	István Pásztor	Pál Perényi
1964	Ferenc Radácsi	Barnabás Gyepes	István Pásztor
1965	Pál Perényi	Barnabás Gyepes	Zoltán Nagyváradi
1966	Barnabás Gyepes	István Pásztor	Zoltán Nagyváradi
1967	Barnabás Gyepes	Pál Perényi	Ferenc Radácsi
1968	Barnabás Gyepes	István Regőczi	Ferenc Radácsi
1969	Barnabás Gyepes	Ferenc Radácsi	János Szőke
1970	Barnabás Gyepes	Ferenc Radácsi	Sándor Csathó
1971	János Szőke	Barnabás Gyepes	Ferenc Radácsi
1972	János Szőke	Barnabás Gyepes	Pál Perényi
1973	Barnabás Gyepes	Sándor Csathó	János Berki
1974	Sándor Csathó	János Szőke	István Sziráczki
1975	István Sziráczki	János Szőke	Pál Perényi
1976	István Sziráczki	László Mészáros	János Jakab
1977	István Sziráczki	László Mészáros	János Szőke
1978	István Sziráczki	János Oresko	Lajos Baksan
1979	László Mészáros	János Jakab	Zoltán Hajdu
1980	István Sziráczki	Zoltán Hajdu	János Oresko
1981	István Sziráczki	Péter Berecz	Zoltán Hajdu
1982	Zoltán Hajdu	Zsolt Pap	József Petrikovics
1983	Zoltán Adorján	Zoltán Hajdu	Sándor Tihanyi
1984	Zoltán Adorján	Zoltán Hajdu	Sándor Tihanyi
1985	Zoltán Adorján	József Petrikovics	Barnabás Gyepes II
1986	Zoltán Adorján	József Petrikovics	Antal Kocso
1987	Zoltán Adorján	József Petrikovics	László Bódi
1988	Zoltán Adorján	Antal Kocso	Róbert Nagy
1989	Zoltán Adorján	Sándor Tihanyi	József Petrikovics
1990	Zoltán Adorján	Zoltán Hajdu	József Petrikovics
1991	Zoltán Adorján	Sándor Tihanyi	József Petrikovics
1992	József Petrikovics	Zoltán Hajdu	Zsolt Böszörményi
1993	Róbert Nagy	Antal Kocso	József Petrikovics
1994	Zoltán Adorján	László Bódi	Róbert Nagy
1995	Zoltán Adorján	László Bódi	Csaba Hell
1996	Zoltán Adorján	Csaba Hell	Sándor Tihanyi
1997	Zoltán Adorján	Norbert Magosi	Sándor Tihanyi
1998	Róbert Nagy	Sándor Tihanyi	Sándor Fekete
1999	Sándor Tihanyi	Attila Stefáni	Zoltán Adorján
2000	Róbert Nagy	Attila Stefáni	Zoltán Adorján
2001	Róbert Nagy	Norbert Magosi	Attila Stefáni
2002	Attila Stefáni	Sándor Tihanyi	László Szatmári
2003	(Slovenia) Matej Ferjan	Sándor Tihanyi	Norbert Magosi
2004	(Slovenia) Matej Ferjan	Sándor Tihanyi	Attila Stefáni
2005	Sándor Tihanyi	(Poland) Rafał Wilk	(Slovenia) Matej Ferjan
2006	(Slovenia) Matej Ferjan	(Poland) Maciej Kuciapa	(Poland) Paweł Miesiąc
2007	(Slovenia) Matej Ferjan	László Szatmári	Sándor Tihanyi
2008	(Slovenia) Matej Ferjan	(Slovenia) Maks Gregoric	László Szatmári
2009	(Slovenia) Matej Ferjan	Norbert Magosi	József Tabaka
2010	József Tabaka	Roland Benkő	Róbert Nagy
2011	Norbert Magosi	László Szatmári	József Tabaka
2012	József Tabaka	Roland Benkő	László Szatmári
2013	Not held		
2014	Norbert Magosi	Sándor Fekete	Sándor Tihanyi
2015	Norbert Magosi	József Tabaka	Roland Benkő
2016	Not held		
2017	József Tabaka	Norbert Magosi	Roland Benkő
2018	Norbert Magosi	Roland Benkő	Roland Kovács
2019	(Czech Republic) Josef Franc	(Poland) Stanisław Burza	(Ukraine) Stanislav Melnychuk
2020	Not held		
2021	Denis Fazekas	Roland Kovács	(Bulgaria) Milen Manev
2022	Denis Fazekas	Norbert Magosi	Richárd Füzesi
2023	Norbert Magosi (Note: Jakub Jamróg won the open classification, while Magosi was the highest-placed Hungarian rider and therefore won the national title.)	Roland Kovács	Márk Bárány
2024	Not held		
2025	Not held		

== See also ==
- Hungary national speedway team
- Hungarian Team Speedway Championship
