= 2004 Speedway World Cup Qualification =

2004 Speedway World Cup

Seasons
- ← 2003 2005 →

The 2004 Speedway World Cup Qualification (SWC) was a two events of motorcycle speedway meetings used to determine the two national teams who qualify for the 2004 Speedway World Cup. According to the FIM rules the top six nations (Sweden, Australia, Denmark, Poland, Great Britain and Czech Republic) from the 2003 Speedway World Cup were automatically qualified.

== Results ==
- Qualifying round 1
- (Italy) Lonigo

Pos.	National team	Pts.
1	Italy	54
2	Germany	47
3	Finland	31
4	Latvia	18

- Qualifying round 2
- (Hungary) Gyula

Pos.	National team	Pts.
1	Hungary	51
2	Slovenia	47
3	Russia	42
4	Austria	10

== Heat details ==
=== Lonigo (1) ===
- Qualifying round 1
- 10 July 2004
- (Italy) Lonigo, Santa Marina Stadium
- Referee: ?

Placing	Team / Rider name	Total	1	2	3	4	5	6	7	8	9	10	11	12	13	14	15	16	17	18	19	20	21	22	23	24	25
1	Italy	54	2	3	6	7	10	12	15	15	18	21	22	24	25	28	31	32	33	36	38	40	42	45	48	51	54
1	(1) Paolo Salvatelli	11	2								3				1							2		3
1	(2) Armando Castagna	11		1								3				3		1							3
1	(3) Emiliano Sanchez	12			3			2									3		1							3
1	(4) Simone Terenzani	11				1			3				1							3							3
1	(5) Andrea Maida	9					3			0				2							2		2
2	Germany	47	3	6	7	9	10	11	13	16	17	18	21	24	27	29	31	33	35	36	39	42	43	43	43	45	47
2	(1) Mirko Wolter	10	3						2								2				3				0
2	(2) Martin Smolinski	14		3						3			3									3				2
2	(3) Matthias Schultz	9			1						1			3				2									2
2	(4) Christian Hefenbrock	9				2						1			3				2				1
2	(5) Thomas Stange	5					1	1								2				1				F
Placing	Team / Rider name	Total	1	2	3	4	5	6	7	8	9	10	11	12	13	14	15	16	17	18	19	20	21	22	23	24	25
3	Finland	31	1	3	3	3	5	8	9	10	12	12	14	14	16	16	16	19	22	24	24	24	27	29	31	31	31
3	(1) Kai Laukkanen	15	1					3					2					3	3				3
3	(2) Tero Aarnio	5		2					1					0					-					2
3	(3) Kauko Nieminen	7			N					1					2					2					2
3	(4) Tomi Reima	2				X					2					0					T					0
3	(5) Juha Hautamäki	2					2					0					E					0					0
4	Latvia	18	0	0	2	5	5	5	5	7	7	9	9	10	10	11	12	12	12	12	13	14	14	15	16	17	18
4	(1) Kasts Poudzuks	4	0							2						1			0								1
4	(2) Leonid Paura	1		0							0						1			F			0
4	(3) Nikolaj Kokin	6			2							2	0								1			1
4	(4) Andrejs Koroļevs	6				3		0						1								1			1
4	(5) Alexander Biznia	1					0		0						0			E								1
Placing	Team / Rider name	Total	1	2	3	4	5	6	7	8	9	10	11	12	13	14	15	16	17	18	19	20	21	22	23	24	25

M - exclusion for exceeding two minute time allowance • T - exclusion for touching the tapes • X - other exclusion • E - retired or mechanical failure • F - fell

Helmet colours were permanent for each team (red, blue, white and yellow/black). Colours in tables show gate positions:
gate A – inside	gate B	gate C	gate D – outside

=== Gyula (2) ===
- Qualifying round 2
- 10 July 2004
- (Hungary) Christián László Municipal Sports Complex, Gyula

Placing	Team / Rider name	Total	1	2	3	4	5	6	7	8	9	10	11	12	13	14	15	16	17	18	19	20	21	22	23	24	25
1	Hungary	51	2	2	5	7	10	11	14	17	19	22	24	27	28	31	32	33	36	37	40	42	42	44	46	48	51
1	(1) Sándor Tihanyi	14	2							3						3			3								3
1	(2) Szabolcs Vida	4		0							2						1			1			0
1	(3) Norbert Magosi	13			3							3	2								3			2
1	(4) Attila Stefani	10				2		1						3								2			2
1	(5) Laszlo Szatmari	10					3		3						1			1								2
2	Slovenia	47	3	6	8	9	10	13	13	15	18	20	20	20	23	25	28	28	28	31	33	36	38	41	42	45	47
2	(1) Matej Žagar	18	3								3				3					3		3		3
2	(2) Jernej Kolenko	10		3								2				2		0			2				1
2	(3) Izak Šantej	13			2			3									3		0				2			3
2	(4) Primoz Legan	3				1			0				0							-							2
2	(5) Ales Kraljic	3					1			2				0							-		-
Placing	Team / Rider name	Total	1	2	3	4	5	6	7	8	9	10	11	12	13	14	15	16	17	18	19	20	21	22	23	24	25
3	Russia	42	1	2	3	6	8	10	11	12	13	14	17	19	21	22	24	27	29	31	32	33	36	37	40	41	42
3	(1) Denis Saifutdinov	5	1						1								2				1				-
3	(2) Roman Ivanov	10		1						1			3									1			3	1
3	(3) Victor Golubovsky	8			1						1			2				3									1
3	(4) Ilja Bondarenko	11				3						1			2				2				3
3	(5) Sergey Eroshin	8					2	2								1				2				1
4	Austria	10	0	2	2	2	2	2	4	4	4	4	5	6	6	6	6	8	9	9	9	9	10	10	10	10	10
4	(1) Fritz Wallner	4	0					0					1					2					1
4	(2) Manuel Hauzinger	6		2					2					1					1					0
4	(3) Norbert Grogletz	0			0					0					0					0					0
4	(4) Mario Ozelt	0				0					0					0					0					0
4	(5) Oliver Ozelt	0					0					0					0					0					0
Placing	Team / Rider name	Total	1	2	3	4	5	6	7	8	9	10	11	12	13	14	15	16	17	18	19	20	21	22	23	24	25

M - exclusion for exceeding two minute time allowance • T - exclusion for touching the tapes • X - other exclusion • E - retired or mechanical failure • F - fell

Helmet colours were permanent for each team (red, blue, white and yellow/black). Colours in tables show gate positions:
gate A – inside	gate B	gate C	gate D – outside

== See also ==
- 2004 Speedway World Cup
