= 2001 Speedway World Cup Qualification =

2001 FIM Speedway World Cup

Seasons
- ← none 2002 →

The 2001 Speedway World Cup Qualification (SWC) was two events of motorcycle speedway meetings used to determine the four national teams who qualify for the 2001 Speedway World Cup.

== Results ==
- Preliminary round 1
- (Slovenia) Ljubljana

Pos.	National team	Pts.
1	Slovenia	48
2	Russia	45
3	Italy	25
4	Ukraine	1

- Preliminary round 2
- (Hungary) Debrecen

Pos.	National team	Pts.
1	Finland	48
2	Hungary	47
3	Norway	12
4	Latvia	10

== Heat details ==
=== Ljubljana (1) ===
- Preliminary round 1
- 3 June 2001
- (Slovenia) Ljubljana
- Referee: ?

Placing	Team / Rider name	Total	1	2	3	4	5	6	7	8	9	10	11	12	13	14	15	16	Pts	17	18	19	20
1	Slovenia	48	3	4	7	10	11	13	13	16	18	21	24	27	30	33	35	38		41	43	45	48
1	(1) Izak Šantej	14				3				3				3				3	12		2
1	(2) Jernej Kolenko	10			3				F				3				2		8			2
1	(3) Ales Dolinar	3		1				2				-			-				3				-
1	(4) Matej Žagar	6	-				1				2					-			3	3
1	(17) Matej Ferjan	15	3									3			3	3			12				3
2	Russia	45	2	5	7	9	11	14	17	19	22	24	26	28	30	32	35	37		39	42	45	45
2	(5) Sergey Darkin	12	2					3					2					2	9			3
2	(6) Roman Povazhny	10		3			2							2			3		10				E
2	(7) Rinat Mardanshin	11				2			3			2				2			9	2
2	(8) Eduard Shaihullin	12			2					2	3				2				9		3
3	Italy	25	1	3	4	5	8	9	11	12	13	14	15	16	17	18	19	20		21	22	23	25
3	(9) Alessandro Dalla Valle	8			1		3					1						1	6				2
3	(10) Simone Tadiello	4				1		1			1						-		3	1
3	(11) Andrea Maida	6		2						1			1			1			5			1
3	(12) Armando Castagna	6	1						2					1	1				5		1
3	(19) Christian Miotello	1															1		1
4	Ukraine	1	0	0	0	0	0	0	1	1	1	1	1	1	1	1	1	1		1	1	1	1
4	(13) Aleksander Lyatosinsky	1		0					1		0							E	1				M
4	(14) Petro Fedik	0	0							0		0					0		0	E
4	(15) Igor Borisenko	0			0			0						0		0			0		0
4	(16) Igor Yepifanov	0				E	0						0		0				0			0
Placing	Team / Rider name	Total	1	2	3	4	5	6	7	8	9	10	11	12	13	14	15	16	Pts	17	18	19	20

M - exclusion for exceeding two-minute time allowance • T - exclusion for touching the tapes • X - other exclusion • E - retired or mechanical failure • F - fell

Helmet colours were permanent for each team (Red, Blue, White and Yellow/Black). Colours in diagrams indicate gate positions:
gate A – inside	gate B	gate C	gate D – outside

=== Debrecen (2) ===
- Preliminary round 2
- 3 June 2001
- (Hungary) Debrecen
- Referee: ?

Placing	Team / Rider name	Total	1	2	3	4	5	6	7	8	9	10	11	12	13	14	15	16	Pts	17	18	19	20
1	Finland	48	3	6	9	11	13	15	18	20	23	26	28	31	33	36	38	40		42	45	46	48
1	(13) Kai Laukkanen	12		3					3		3							2	11			1
1	(14) Kauko Nieminen	13	3							2		3					2		10		3
1	(15) Joonas Kylmäkorpi	13			3			2						3		3			11				2
1	(16) Tomi Reima	6				2	2						2		-				6	-
1	(20) Petri Kokko	4													2				2	2
2	Hungary	47	2	4	5	6	9	12	14	17	18	20	23	25	28	30	33	36		39	41	44	47
2	(5) Róbert Nagy	14	2					3					3					3	11				3
2	(6) Norbert Magosi	13		2			3							2			3		10			3
2	(7) Gábor Szegvári	10				1			2			2				2			7	3
2	(8) László Szatmári	10			1					3	1				3				8		2
2	(18) Zsolt Bence	0																	0
3	Norway	12	1	2	4	7	7	8	8	9	11	11	11	11	11	11	12	12		12	12	12	12
3	(9) Rune Holta	2			2		N					N						N	2
3	(10) Brojn Gundel Hansa	7				3		1			2						1		7				0
3	(11) Pierre Mullen	2		1						1			0			0			2		0
3	(12) Eivind Rappen	1	1						0					0	N				1
4	Latvia	10	0	0	0	0	1	1	2	2	2	2	3	4	5	6	6	7		7	7	9	10
4	(1) Denis Popovich	3				0				0				1				1	2				1
4	(2) Leonid Paura	4			0				1				1				0		2			2
4	(3) Stanislav Paura	1		N				0				N			1				1	0
4	(4) Aleksandr Ivanov	2	N				1				0					1			2		0
Placing	Team / Rider name	Total	1	2	3	4	5	6	7	8	9	10	11	12	13	14	15	16	Pts	17	18	19	20

M - exclusion for exceeding two-minute time allowance • T - exclusion for touching the tapes • X - other exclusion • E - retired or mechanical failure • F - fell

Helmet colours were permanent for each team (Red, Blue, White and Yellow/Black). Colours in diagrams indicate gate positions:
gate A – inside	gate B	gate C	gate D – outside

== See also ==
- Motorcycle speedway
