= 2001 Individual Speedway European Championship =

Motorcycle racing competition

Seasons
- ← none 2002 →

The 2001 Individual Speedway European Championship

== Qualification ==
- Qualifying Round:
  - June 4, 2001
  - (Germany) Abensberg

Pos.	Rider	Points	Details
1	(Czech Republic) Aleš Dryml, Jr.	15	(3,3,3,3,3)
2	(Slovenia) Izak Šantej	13	(3,3,2,3,2)
3	(Russia) Sergej Kuzin	12	(3,3,3,3,0)
4	(Croatia) Zlatko Krżnarić	11	(2,2,2,3,2)
5	(Germany) Herbert Rudolph	10	(3,1,1,2,3)
6	(Germany) Joachim Kugelmann	10	(2,1,3,2,2)
7	(Czech Republic) Lubomir Batelka	9	(2,2,1,1,3)
8	(Germany) Martin Smolinski	8	(X,3,3,1,1)
9	(Slovakia) Vladimir Visvader	8	(1,2,2,2,1)
10	(Netherlands) Jim Groen	7	(1,2,2,2,0)
11	(France) Cyril Thomas	5	(0,1,0,1,3)
12	(Ukraine) Petro Fedyk	4	(1,N,1,1,1)
13	(Latvia) Aleksandrs Bizņa	3	(2,1,0,Fx,N)
14	(Netherlands) UIlke Kooistra	2	(1,0,1,0,0)
15	(Italy) Alessandro Dalla Valle	0	(X,Fx,N,N,N)
16	(Hungary) Csaba Hell	—	—

- Semi-Final A:
  - July 29, 2001
  - (Ukraine) Lviv

Pos.	Rider	Points	Details
1	(Poland) Artur Pietrzyk	14	(2,3,3,3,3)
2	(Hungary) Róbert Nagy	12+3	(3,2,2,2,3)
3	(Czech Republic) Bohumil Brhel	11	(3,3,3,0,2)
4	(Russia) Roman Povazhny	11	(2,2,2,3,2)
5	(Croatia) Zlatko Krżnarić	10	(1,3,2,3,1)
6	(Czech Republic) Aleš Dryml, Jr.	10	(3,2,1,1,3)
7	(Poland) Tomasz Jędrzejak	9	(1,3,3,2,0)
8	(Hungary) Gabor Szegvári	8+3	(1,2,1,2,2)
9	(Latvia) Nikolajs Kokins	8+X	(2,1,1,2,2)
10	(Ukraine) Ihor Marko	7	(2,X,0,3,2)
11	(Ukraine) Ihor Borysenko	5	(0,2,1,1,1)
12	(Czech Republic) Pavel Ondrasík	5	(1,1,2,1,X)
13	(Poland) Remigiusz Wronkowski	4	(0,1,2,0,1)
14	(Russia) Oleg Kurguskin	2	(2,-,-,-,-)
15	(Ukraine) Serhiy Senko	2	(1,0,0,1)
16	(Slovakia) Vladimir Visvader	1	(F,0,0,1,0)
17	(Ukraine) Petro Fedyk	0	(0,-,-,-,-)
18	(Ukraine) Ihor Jepifanov	0	(X,X,X,X,X)

- Semi-Final B:
  - August 12, 2001
  - (Slovenia) Lendava

Pos.	Rider	Points	Details
1	(Slovenia) Matej Ferjan	14+3	(3,2,3,3,3)
2	(Poland) Krzysztof Cegielski	14+2	(3,3,3,3,2)
3	(Poland) Mariusz Staszewski	13	(2,3,3,2,3)
4	(Poland) Piotr Winiarz	12	(2,3,2,3,2)
5	(Slovenia) Izak Šantej	10	(3,1,2,1,3)
6	(Russia) Sergey Kuzin	10	(1,2,3,1,3)
7	(Czech Republic) Lubomir Batleka	9+3	(1,3,2,2,1)
8	(Germany) Joachim Kugelmann	9+X	(0,2,2,3,2)
9	(Italy) Christian Miotello	6	(3,2,1,0,0)
10	(Slovenia) Joze Koren	6	(2,1,1,Fx,2)
11	(Germany) Thomas Stange	5	(1,0,1,2,1)
12	(Slovenia) Jernej Kolenko	4	(2,2,X)
13	(Netherlands) Jim Groen	3	(1,1,0,1,0)
14	(Germany) Rene Schafer	2	(0,X,1,1,T)
15	(Netherlands) Emil Groen	2	(0,1,0,0,1)
16	(Belgium) Jan Hendrik	0	(T,0,0,0,0)
17	(Croatia) Ivan Vargek	0	(0,0,X,-,-)

== Final ==
- August 26, 2001
- (Belgium) Heusden Zolder

Placing	Rider	Total	1	2	3	4	5	6	7	8	9	10	11	12	13	14	15	16	17	18	19	20	Pts	Pos
1	(Czech Republic) (4) Bohumil Brhel	14	3							3				3				2				3	14	1
2	(Poland) (12) Mariusz Staszewski	13			3					2		3			2						3		13	2
3	(Poland) (5) Krzysztof Cegielski	12		3			2					2					3					2	12	3
4	(Russia) (7) Sergey Kuzin	12		2					2					2	3					3			12	4
5	(Croatia) (15) Zlatko Krznaric	9				3			3			0						1	2				9	5
6	(Poland) (3) Piotr Winiarz	8	1						E				3				2				2		8	6
7	(Russia) (2) Roman Povazhny	8	0					2				1				3				2			8	7
8	(Germany) (13) Joachim Kugelmann	7				2	3							1		1					0		7	8
9	(Hungary) (1) Robert Nagy	7	2				0				1				1				3				7	9
10	(Czech Republic) (14) Aleš Dryml, Jr.	7				1		3					2		0							1	7	10
11	(Slovenia) (9) Matej Ferjan	7			2		1						0					3		1			7	11
12	(Poland) (11) Artur Pietrzyk	6			0				1		3					2						F	6	12
13	(Poland) (6) Tomasz Jędrzejak	5		1				1			2							0			1		5	13
14	(Slovenia) (10) Izak Šantej	3			1			0						0			1		1				3	14
15	(Hungary) (16) Gábor Szegvári	1				0				1	E						E			-			1	15
16	(Czech Republic) (8) Lubomír Batelka	1		E						0			1			0			0				1	16
R1	(Czech Republic) (17) Pavel Ondrašík	0																		0			0	R1
Placing	Rider	Total	1	2	3	4	5	6	7	8	9	10	11	12	13	14	15	16	17	18	19	20	Pts	Pos

m - exclusion for exceeding two minute time allowance • t - exclusion for touching the tapes • x - other exclusion • e - retired or mechanical failure • f - fell • ns - non-starter • nc - non-classify

gate A - inside	gate B	gate C	gate D - outside
