= 2006 Speedway World Cup Qualification =

2006 Speedway World Cup

Seasons
- ← 2005 2007 →

The 2006 Speedway World Cup Qualification (SWC) were two motorcycle speedway events used to determine the two national teams who qualify for the 2006 Speedway World Cup. According to the FIM rules the top six nations (Poland, Sweden, Denmark, Great Britain, Australia and Czech Republic) from the 2005 Speedway World Cup were automatically qualified.

== Results ==
- Qualifying round 1
- (Latvia) Daugavpils

Pos.	National team	Pts.
1	Finland	42
2	Germany	39+3
3	Russia	39+2
4	Latvia	30

- Qualifying round 2
- (Hungary) Miskolc

Pos.	National team	Pts.
1	United States	59
2	Slovenia	41
3	Hungary	25+3
4	Italy	25+2

== Heat details ==
=== Daugavpils (1) ===
- Qualifying round 1
- 27 May 2005
- (Latvia) Daugavpils, Latvijas Spidveja Centrs
- Referee: ?

Placing	Team / Rider name	Total	1	2	3	4	5	6	7	8	9	10	11	12	13	14	15	16	17	18	19	20	21	22	23	24	25	26
1	Finland	42	3	5	5	6	7	9	12	15	15	17	19	22	23	25	25	28	28	28	31	34	35	36	38	40	42
1	(1) Kai Laukkanen (c)	11	3						3								E				3				2
1	(2) Joonas Kylmäkorpi	12		2						3			2									3				2
1	(3) Kauko Nieminen	8			0						0			3				3									2	style="background-color:" |
1	(4) Juha Hautamäki	5				1						2			1				0				1
1	(5) Tomi Reima	6					1	2								2				0				1
2	Germany	39	2	5	8	8	8	9	11	12	13	13	14	16	19	20	22	24	27	30	31	33	36	38	39	39	39
2	(1) Martin Smolinski (c)	9	2					1					1					2					3
2	(2) Christian Hefenbrock	12		3					2					2					3					2				3
2	(3) Thomas Stange	11			3					1					3					3					1
2	(4) Stephan Katt	3				0					1					1					1					0
2	(5) Tobias Kroner	4					0					X					2					2					-
Placing	Team / Rider name	Total	1	2	3	4	5	6	7	8	9	10	11	12	13	14	15	16	17	18	19	20	21	22	23	24	25	26
3	Russia	39	1	2	3	6	9	9	9	11	13	16	19	19	19	22	25	25	26	28	30	30	32	32	35	36	39
3	(1) Denis Gizatullin (c)	13	1							2						3			1						3		3	2
3	(2) Siemen Wlasow	10		1							2						3			2			2
3	(3) Sergey Darkin	9			1							3	3								2			0
3	(4) Renat Gafurov	3				3		X						N								N			-
3	(5) Ilia Bondarenko	4					3		0						E			0								1
4	Latvia	30	0	0	2	4	6	9	10	10	13	14	14	15	17	17	18	19	21	22	22	23	23	26	26	29	30
4	(1) Andrejs Koroļevs	10	0								3				2			1				1		3
4	(2) Vjačeslavs Giruckis	1		0								1				0		-							0
4	(3) Ķasts Poudžuks	11			2			3									1		2							3
4	(4) Maksims Bogdanovs (c)	5				2			1				0							1							1	style="background-color:" |
4	(5) Nikolajs Kokins	3					2			0				1							0		0
Placing	Team / Rider name	Total	1	2	3	4	5	6	7	8	9	10	11	12	13	14	15	16	17	18	19	20	21	22	23	24	25	26

M - exclusion for exceeding two minute time allowance • T - exclusion for touching the tapes • X - other exclusion • E - retired or mechanical failure • F - fell

Helmet colours were permanent for each team (red, blue, white and yellow/black). Colours in tables show gate positions:
gate A – inside	gate B	gate C	gate D – outside

=== Miskolc (2) ===
- Qualifying round 2
- 28 May 2005
- (Hungary) Miskolc
- Referee: ?

Placing	Team / Rider name	Total	1	2	3	4	5	6	7	8	9	10	11	12	13	14	15	16	17	18	19	20	21	22	23	24	25	26
1	United States	59	2	5	7	10	13	16	18	20	21	24	27	30	32	34	36	39	42	43	46	49	52	55	55	57	59
1	(1) Greg Hancock (c)	14	2					3					3					3					3
1	(2) Billy Janniro	14		3					2					3					3					3
1	(3) Ronnie Correy	7			2					2					2					1					0
1	(4) Sam Ermolenko	11				3					1					2					3					2
1	(5) Billy Hamill	13					3					3					2					3					2	style="background-color:" |
2	Slovenia	41	3	5	8	8	9	9	12	15	17	17	18	18	21	22	25	25	25	28	30	31	32	32	35	38	41
2	(1) Matej Žagar (c)	17	3						3						3		3				2				3
2	(2) Jernej Kolenko	10		2						3			1									1				3
2	(3) Izak Šantej	8			3						2			0				T									3	style="background-color:" |
2	(4) Maks Gregorič	1				T						X			-				0				1
2	(5) Denis Štojs	5					1	0								1				3				0
Placing	Team / Rider name	Total	1	2	3	4	5	6	7	8	9	10	11	12	13	14	15	16	17	18	19	20	21	22	23	24	25	26
3	Hungary	25	1	1	2	4	4	5	5	6	6	8	10	11	11	14	14	16	18	20	21	21	21	23	25	25	25
3	(1) Norbert Magosi	9	1							1						3		2	2	?							0	style="background-color:" |
3	(2) Zsolt Bencze	0		0							0						0			-			0
3	(3) Laszlo Szatmari (c)	10			1							2	2		X			?		2	1			2				3
3	(4) Sándor Tihanyi	6				2		1						1								0			2
3	(5) Jozsef Tabaka	0					0		0						-			-								0
4	Italy	25	0	1	1	2	4	6	7	7	10	11	11	13	14	14	15	16	17	17	17	19	21	22	23	24	25
4	(1) Mattia Carpanese (c)	7	0								3				1					0		2		1				2
4	(2) Guglielmo Franchetti	3		1								1				X		1							-
4	(3) Daniele Tessari	5			0			2									1		1							1
4	(4) Christian Miotello	3				1			1				0							-							1	style="background-color:" |
4	(5) Simone Terenzani	7					2			0				2							0		2		1
Placing	Team / Rider name	Total	1	2	3	4	5	6	7	8	9	10	11	12	13	14	15	16	17	18	19	20	21	22	23	24	25	26

M - exclusion for exceeding two minute time allowance • T - exclusion for touching the tapes • X - other exclusion • E - retired or mechanical failure • F - fell

Helmet colours were permanent for each team (red, blue, white and yellow/black). Colours in tables show gate positions:
gate A – inside	gate B	gate C	gate D – outside

== See also ==
- 2006 Speedway World Cup
