= 1973 Speedway World Pairs Championship =

4th official edition of the World motorcycle speedway Pairs Championship

1973 World Pairs Championship

Seasons
- ← 1972 1974 →

The 1973 Speedway World Pairs Championship was the fourth official FIM Speedway World Pairs Championship. The final took place in Borås, Sweden. The championship was won by the host country Sweden (24 points). The silver medal was won by Denmark who beat Poland after a run-off (both 21 points).

== Semifinal 1 ==
- (Poland) Polonia Bydgoszcz Stadium, Bydgoszcz
- 13 May

Placing	Pair / Rider Name	Total	1	2	3	4	5	6	7	8	9	10	11	12	13	14	15	16	17	18	19	20	21	22
1	Poland	30							10							20							30
1	(1) Zenon Plech	13	3			2				2			2				2			2
1	(2) Henryk Glücklich	17	2			3				3			3				3			3
2	(Soviet Union) USSR	22 +3							6							13							22
2	(3) Vladimir Gordeev	12	1				3				3			0				2			3			3
2	(4) Anatoly Kuzmin	10	0				2				2			2				3			1
3	(Czechoslovakia) CSK	22 +2							10							16							22
3	(9) Jiří Štancl	12			3			2				2		1			1					3		2
3	(10) Petr Ondrašík	10			2			3				X		3			E					2
4	Hungary	11							6							8							11
4	(7) Tibor Danka	4		2				1			1					0				0			0
4	(8) Sandor Domokos	7		3				0			E					1				1			2
5	(Socialist Federal Republic of Yugoslavia) Yugoslavia	6							2							4							6
5	(5) Drasko Orsic	0		0			0			E					0				0			E
5	(6) Stefan Kekec	6		1			1			1					1				1			1
6	Austria	5							2							4							5
6	(11) Gunther Walla	2			1				1				0		-			-					-
6	(12) Josef Haider	3			0				0				0		2			0					1
-	Poland B	22							6							15							22
-	(13) Stanislaw Kasa	11				0			2			1				3			3		2
-	(14) Marian Zaranek	11				1			3			3				2			2		0
-	(Poland) track reserve	7							0							3							7
-	(15) Andrzej Koselski	7
-	(16) -	0
Placing	Pair / Rider Name	Total	1	2	3	4	5	6	7	8	9	10	11	12	13	14	15	16	17	18	19	20	21	22

m - exclusion for exceeding two minute time allowance • t - exclusion for touching the tapes • x - other exclusion • e - retired or mechanical failure • f - fell
ns - non-starter • nc - non-classify

gate A - inside	gate B	gate C	gate D - outside

== Semifinal 2 ==
- (England) Poole Stadium, Poole
- 23 May

Placing	Pair / Rider Name	Total	1	2	3	4	5	6	7	8	9	10	11	12	13	14	15	16	17	18	19	20	21	22
1	Denmark	23 +3							6							14							23
1	(1) Ole Olsen	18	3			3				3			3				3			3				3
1	(2) Kurt Bøgh	5	0			0				2			0				2			1
2	New Zealand	23 +2							7							15							23
2	(3) Ivan Mauger	17	2				3				3			3				3			3			2
2	(4) Graeme Stapleton	6	1				1				1			1				2			0
3	Norway	22							7							15							22
3	(13) Reidar Eide	12				2			3			0				3			3		1
3	(14) Dag Lövaas	10				1			1			3				2			1		2
4	England	19							7							15							19
4	(11) Terry Betts	9			3				E				2		3			0					1
4	(12) Ray Wilson	10			2				2				1		2			1					2
5	Sweden	18							10							13							18
5	(7) Christer Löfqvist	6		2				2			0					E				2			0
5	(8) Bernt Persson	12		3				3			2					1				X			3
6	Scotland	11							2							7							11
6	(9) George Hunter	6			1			1				2		E			0					2
6	(10) Bobby Beaton	5			0			0				1		2			1					1
7	Australia	10							3							5							10
7	(5) John Boulger	7		1			X			1					0				2			3
7	(6) John Titman	3		0			2			0					1				0			X
-	(England) track reserve	0							0							0							0
-	(15) Bobby Collins	0
-	(16) -	0
Placing	Pair / Rider Name	Total	1	2	3	4	5	6	7	8	9	10	11	12	13	14	15	16	17	18	19	20	21	22

m - exclusion for exceeding two minute time allowance • t - exclusion for touching the tapes • x - other exclusion • e - retired or mechanical failure • f - fell
ns - non-starter • nc - non-classify

gate A - inside	gate B	gate C	gate D - outside

== World final ==
- (Sweden) Ryavallen, Borås
- 8 June 1973

Placing	Pair / Rider Name	Total	1	2	3	4	5	6	7	8	9	10	11	12	13	14	15	16	17	18	19	20	21
1	Sweden	24							10							18							24
1	(13) Anders Michanek	15				2			3			3				2			3		2
1	(14) Tommy Jansson	9				3			2			2				1			0		1
2	Denmark	21							6							13							21
2	(3) Ole Olsen	18+3	3				3				3			3				3			3
2	(4) Kurt Bøgh	3	0				0				0			1				2			0
3	Poland	21							9							15							21
3	(7) Zenon Plech	14+2		3				3			2					3				X			3
3	(8) Zbigniew Marcinkowski	7		1				2			1					E				2			1
4	Soviet Union	20							5							12							20
4	(5) Vladimir Gordeev	10		2			2			0					2				1			3
4	(6) Anatoly Kuzmin	10		0			1			2					3				2			2
5	Norway	17							4							11							17
5	(1) Reidar Eide	9	1			1				1			3				3			E
5	(2) Dag Lövaas	8	2			0				3			0				0			3
6	Czechoslovakia	11							4							7							11
6	(9) Jiří Štancl	9			2			1				1		2			2					1
6	(10) Petr Ondrašík	2			1			0				0		0			1					0
7	New Zealand	10							4							7							10
7	(11) Ivan Mauger	8			3				1				2		X			X					2
7	(12) Graeme Stapleton	2			0				0				1		X			1					0
Placing	Pair / Rider Name	Total	1	2	3	4	5	6	7	8	9	10	11	12	13	14	15	16	17	18	19	20	21

m - exclusion for exceeding two minute time allowance • t - exclusion for touching the tapes • x - other exclusion • e - retired or mechanical failure • f - fell
ns - non-starter • nc - non-classify

gate A - inside	gate B	gate C	gate D - outside

== See also ==
- 1973 Individual Speedway World Championship
- 1973 Speedway World Team Cup
- motorcycle speedway
- 1973 in sports
