= Slovenia national under-21 speedway team =

Slovenia
- Association: Automobile Association of Slovenia; Avto-Moto Zveza Slovenija
- FIM code: AMZS
- Team manager: Franci Kalin ^{(2010)}
- Team captain: Aljosa Remih ^{(2010)}

World Championships
Team U-21	—	—	—
Individual U-21	—	—	2
- Best result: 3rd - Matej Ferjan (1998) and Matej Žagar (2004)

The Slovenia national under-21 speedway team is the national under-21 motorcycle speedway team of Slovenia and is controlled by the Automobile Association of Slovenia. The team has never qualify to the Under-21 World Cup finals. Two Slovenian riders, Matej Ferjan and Matej Žagar has won bronze medal of the Individual U-21 World Championship.

== Competition ==
Team Speedway Junior World Championship
Year	Place	Pts.	Riders
2005	—	—	4th place in Qualifying Round One; Maks Gregorič (1), Matic Voldrih (0) and three Hungarian riders (2)
2006–2007			Did not enter
2008	—	—	4th place in Qualifying Round Two; Aleksander Čonda (1), Matija Duh (1), Aljosa Remih (1), Dalibor Bot (1), Matic Voldrih (0)
2009	—	—	3rd place in Qualifying Round Two; Matic Voldrih (12), Ladislav Vida (2) and three Croatian riders (5)
2010	—	—	4th place in Qualifying Round Two; Matija Duh (8), Aleksander Čonda (6), Aljosa Remih (3), Samo Kukovica (2), Nejc Malesic (1)
2011	—	—	3rd place in Qualifying Round; Aleksander Čonda (12), Nejc Malesic (8), Matic Ivacic (4), Ladislav Vida (2), Ziga Radkovic (1)

== See also ==
- Slovenia national speedway team
