= 2009 Speedway World Cup squads =

This article lists the confirmed national speedway squads for the 2009 Speedway World Cup tournament held between 11 and 18 July 2009. Squads for the tournament consisted of 10 riders, same as the previous tournament in 2008. Each participating national association had to confirm its 10-rider until one month before first tournament meeting.

== Australia ==
Manager: (Australia) Craig Boyce

Rider	DoB	Age	Clubs
Leigh Adams #6	1971-08-28	38	(Poland) Leszno, (United Kingdom) Swindon, (Sweden) Lejonen,
Ryan Sullivan	1975-01-20	34	(Poland) Toruń, (Sweden) Rospiggarna,
Jason Crump #2	1975-08-06	34	(Poland) Wrocław, (Sweden) Elit Vetlanda,
Adam Shields	1977-02-08	32	(Poland) Leszno, (United Kingdom) Lakeside, (Sweden) Vargarna,
Davey Watt	1978-01-06	31	(Poland) Wrocław, (United Kingdom) Eastbourne, (Sweden) Lejonen,
Travis McGowan	1981-01-13	28	(Poland) Ostrów Wlkp., (United Kingdom) Swindon,
Rory Schlein	1984-09-01	25	(Poland) Grudziądz, (United Kingdom) Coventry, (Sweden) Dackarna,
Cameron Woodward	1985-01-08	24	(Poland) Rzeszów, (United Kingdom) Eastbourne, (Sweden) Valsarna,
Troy Batchelor	1987-08-29	22	(Poland) Leszno, (United Kingdom) , (Sweden) Smederna,
Chris Holder	1987-09-24	22	(Poland) Toruń, (United Kingdom) Poole, (Sweden) Lejonen,
Darcy Ward	1992-05-04	17	(Poland) Toruń, (United Kingdom) King's Lynn Stars, (Germany) AC Landshut,

== Czech Republic ==
Manager: (Czech Republic) Milan Špinka

Rider	DoB	Age	Clubs
Tomáš Topinka	1974-06-05	35	(United Kingdom) King's Lynn Stars, (Czech Republic) PDK Mseno,
Adrian Rymel	1975-10-30	34	(United Kingdom) Workington, (Czech Republic) Olymp Prague, (Hungary) Speedway Miskolc,
Josef Franc	1979-01-18	30	(Poland) Krosno, (United Kingdom) Berwick, (Czech Republic) Olymp Prague,
Aleš Dryml, Jr.	1979-10-19	30	(Poland) Rzeszów, (United Kingdom) Peterborough, (Czech Republic) Zlata Prilba Pardubice,
Lukáš Dryml	1981-04-16	28	(Poland) Rzeszów, (United Kingdom) Eastbourne, (Czech Republic) Zlata Prilba Pardubice,
Jan Jaros	1984-11-11	25	(Poland) Krosno, (Czech Republic) PDK Mseno,
Luboš Tomíček, Jr.	1986-03-14	23	(Poland) Lublin, (Sweden) Rospiggarna, (Denmark) Slangerup, (Czech Republic) Olymp Prague, (Italy) Lonigo,
Hynek Štichauer	1987-06-17	22	(Poland) Lublin, (United Kingdom) Wolverhampton, (Denmark) Fjelsted, (Czech Republic) Zlata Prilba Pardubice,
Filip Šitera	1988-04-18	21	(Poland) Gniezno, (Sweden) Griparna, (Czech Republic) PDK Mseno,
Matěj Kůs	1989-07-11	20	(Poland) Toruń, (Sweden) Vargarna, (Czech Republic) Olymp Prague, (Italy) MC La Favorita Sarego,

== Denmark ==
Manager: (Denmark) Jan Stæchmann

Rider	DoB	Age	Clubs
Nicki Pedersen #1	1977-04-02	32	(Poland) Częstochowa, (Sweden) Lejonen, (Denmark) Holsted,
Jesper B. Monberg	1977-10-14	32	(Poland) Tarnów, (Sweden) Indianerna, (Denmark) Slangerup, (Czech Republic) Zlata Prilba Pardubice,
Bjarne Pedersen	1978-07-12	31	(Poland) Tarnów, (United Kingdom) Poole, (Sweden) Västervik, (Denmark) Holstebro,
Charlie Gjedde	1979-12-28	30	(Poland) Rzeszów, (United Kingdom) Belle Vue, (Sweden) Rospiggarna, (Denmark) Grindsted,
Hans N. Andersen #5	1980-11-03	29	(Poland) Gdańsk, (United Kingdom) Poole, (Sweden) Dackarna, (Denmark) Slangerup,
Niels Kristian Iversen	1982-06-20	27	(Poland) Zielona Góra, (United Kingdom) Peterborough, (Sweden) Västervik, (Denmark) Esbjerg,
Mads Korneliussen	1983-06-15	26	(Poland) Ostrów Wlkp., (United Kingdom) Peterborough, (Denmark) Esbjerg, (Germany) MSC Brokstedt,
Kenneth Bjerre #12	1984-05-24	25	(Poland) Gdańsk, (United Kingdom) Peterborough, (Sweden) Dackarna, (Denmark) Vojens, (Czech Republic) Zlata Prilba Pardubice,
Morten Risager	1987-09-30	22	(Poland) Gniezno, (Sweden) Hammarby, (Denmark) Slangerup,
Patrick Hougaard	1989-05-23	20	(Poland) Tarnów, (United Kingdom) Belle Vue, (Sweden) Elit Vetlanda, (Denmark) Holsted,

== Great Britain ==
Manager: (United Kingdom) Rob Lyon

Rider	DoB	Age	Clubs
Joe Screen	1972-11-27	37	(United Kingdom) Poole, (Sweden) Vargarna, (Hungary) Speedway Miskolc,
Scott Nicholls #9	1978-04-16	31	(Poland) Wrocław, (United Kingdom) Coventry, (Sweden) Vargarna,
Lee Richardson	1979-04-25	30	(Poland) Częstochowa, (United Kingdom) Lakeside, (Sweden) Elit Vetlanda,
Simon Stead	1982-04-25	27	(Poland) Ostrów Wlkp., (United Kingdom) Swindon,
Oliver Allen	1982-05-27	27	(Poland) Grudziądz, (United Kingdom) Coventry, (Sweden) Griparna,
Chris Harris #11	1982-11-28	27	(Poland) Ostrów Wlkp., (United Kingdom) Coventry, (Sweden) Västervik,
Edward Kennett	1986-08-28	23	(United Kingdom) Coventry, (Sweden) Vargarna, (Denmark) Vojens,
Ben Barker	1988-03-10	21	(Poland) Wrocław, (United Kingdom) Coventry,
Lewis Bridger	1989-11-04	20	(Poland) Częstochowa, (United Kingdom) Eastbourne,
Tai Woffinden	1990-08-10	19	(Poland) Częstochowa, (United Kingdom) Wolverhampton, (Sweden) Vargarna, (Denmark) Vojens, (Czech Republic) Zlata Prilba Pardubice,

== Poland ==
Manager: (Poland) Marek Cieślak

Rider	DoB	Age	Clubs
Tomasz Gollob #3	1971-04-11	38	(Poland) Gorzów Wlkp., (Sweden) Västervik, (Denmark) Esbjerg,
Rune Holta #8	1973-08-29	36	(Poland) Gorzów Wlkp., (Sweden) Indianerna,
Piotr Protasiewicz	1975-01-21	34	(Poland) Zielona Góra, (Sweden) Indianerna, (Czech Republic) AK Slany,
Wiesław Jaguś	1975-09-13	34	(Poland) Toruń, (Sweden) Smederna,
Sebastian Ułamek #14	1975-11-20	34	(Poland) Tarnów, (Sweden) Lejonen, (Denmark) Fjelsted,
Grzegorz Walasek #13	1976-08-29	33	(Poland) Zielona Góra, (Sweden) Indianerna,
Rafał Dobrucki	1976-08-29	33	(Poland) Zielona Góra, (Sweden) Piraterna, (Denmark) Brovst,
Jarosław Hampel	1982-04-17	27	(Poland) Leszno, (United Kingdom) Ipswich, (Sweden) Elit Vetlanda,
Krzysztof Kasprzak	1984-07-18	25	(Poland) Leszno, (United Kingdom) Belle Vue, (Sweden) Smederna,
Adrian Miedziński	1985-08-20	24	(Poland) Toruń, (Sweden) Vargarna, (Denmark) Brovst,

== Russia ==
Manager: (Russia) Oleg Kurguskin

Rider	DoB	Age	Clubs
Sergey Darkin	1973-06-18	36	(Russia) Tolyatti, (Hungary) Speedway Miskolc,
Roman Povazhny	1976-10-23	33	(Russia) Balakovo, (Latvia) Daugavpils,
Renat Gafurov	1982-10-08	27	(Poland) Gdańsk, (Sweden) Indianerna, (Russia) Vladivostok,
Denis Gizatullin	1983-03-11	26	(Poland) Rybnik, (Sweden) Hammarby, (Russia) Balakovo,
Roman Ivanov	1984-03-19	25	(Poland) Opole, (Russia) Tolyatti, (Ukraine) Rivne,
Grigory Laguta	1984-04-09	25	(Sweden) Västervik, (Russia) Vladivostok, (Latvia) Daugavpils,
Daniil Ivanov	1986-09-23	23	(Russia) Tolyatti, (Latvia) Daugavpils, (Ukraine) Lviv,
Emil Sayfutdinov #15	1989-10-26	20	(Poland) Bydgoszcz, (Sweden) Piraterna, (Denmark) Vojens, (Russia) Balakovo,
Artem Laguta	1990-11-13	19	(Sweden) Västervik, (Russia) Vladivostok, (Latvia) Daugavpils,
Artem Vodyakov	1991-07-23	18	(Poland) Zielona Góra, (Russia) Balakovo,

== Slovenia ==
Manager: (Slovenia) Tomaz Pozrl

Rider	DoB	Age	Clubs
Izak Šantej	1973-08-26	36	(Slovenia) Krsko,
Denis Štojs	1978-01-23	31	(Slovenia) Lendava, (Hungary) Speedway Miskolc, (Italy) Terenzano,
Matej Žagar	1983-04-03	26	(Poland) Gorzów Wlkp., (Slovenia) Ljubljana,
Ales Kraljic	1984-12-20	25	(Slovenia) Ljubljana,
Maks Gregorič	1985-08-26	24	(Poland) Rawicz, (Slovenia) Ljubljana,
Matic Voldrih	1986-04-17	23	(Poland) Rawicz, (Slovenia) Ljubljana,
Samo Kukovica	1989-02-02	20	(Slovenia) Krsko,
Matija Duh	1989-04-03	20	(Poland) Łódź, (Slovenia) Krsko,
Aleksander Čonda	1990-08-26	19	(Poland) Krosno, (Slovenia) Krsko, (Italy) Lonigo,
Aljosa Remih	1992-03-19	17	(Slovenia) Krsko,

== Sweden ==
Manager: (Sweden) Tobias Johansson

Rider	DoB	Age	Clubs
Magnus Zetterström	1971-12-09	38	(Poland) Gdańsk, (Sweden) Smederna,
Daniel Nermark	1977-07-30	32	(Poland) Ostrów Wlkp., (Sweden) Piraterna,
David Ruud	1980-01-21	29	(Poland) Gorzów Wlkp., (Sweden) Lejonen,
Andreas Jonsson #7	1980-09-03	29	(Poland) Bydgoszcz, (Sweden) Dackarna, (Denmark) Grindsted,
Peter Ljung	1982-10-30	27	(Poland) Gniezno, (Sweden) Elit Vetlanda,
Jonas Davidsson	1984-08-07	25	(Poland) Bydgoszcz, (United Kingdom) Lakeside, (Sweden) Piraterna,
Antonio Lindbäck	1985-05-05	24	(Poland) Bydgoszcz, (Sweden) Piraterna,
Fredrik Lindgren #10	1985-09-15	24	(Poland) Zielona Góra, (United Kingdom) Wolverhampton, (Sweden) Dackarna, (Czech Republic) Zlata Prilba Pardubice,
Sebastian Aldén	1985-11-07	24	(Poland) Rawicz, (Sweden) Valsarna,
Thomas H. Jonasson	1988-11-27	21	(Poland) Gorzów Wlkp., (United Kingdom) Belle Vue, (Sweden) Elit Vetlanda,

== See also ==
- 2009 Speedway World Cup
- 2009 Speedway Grand Prix
