= Hungary national under-21 speedway team =

Youth motorcycle speedway team representing Hungary

Hungary
- Association: Hungarian Motorcycle Sport Federation; Magyar Motorsport Szövetség
- FIM code: MAMS

World Championships
Team U-21	—	—	—
Individual U-21	—	—	—

The Hungary national under-21 speedway team is the national under-21 motorcycle speedway team of Hungary and is controlled by the Hungarian Motorcycle Sport Federation. The team was started in the Under-21 World Cup twice and they did not qualify to the final. In 2005 Hungarian riders started with Slovenian riders as a one team.

== Competition ==
Team Speedway Junior World Championship
Year	Place	Pts.	Riders
2005	—	—	4th place in Qualifying Round One; Jozsef Tabaka (2), Mate Szegedi (0), Roland Kovacs (0) and two Slovenian riders (1)
2006			Did not enter
2007	—	—	4th place in Qualifying Round Two; Jozsef Tabaka (6), Roland Kovacs (2), Attila Lörincz (1), Tamas Sike (—)
2008–2009			Did not enter

== See also ==
- Hungary national speedway team
