= 1972 Polish speedway season =

Motorcycle racing competition

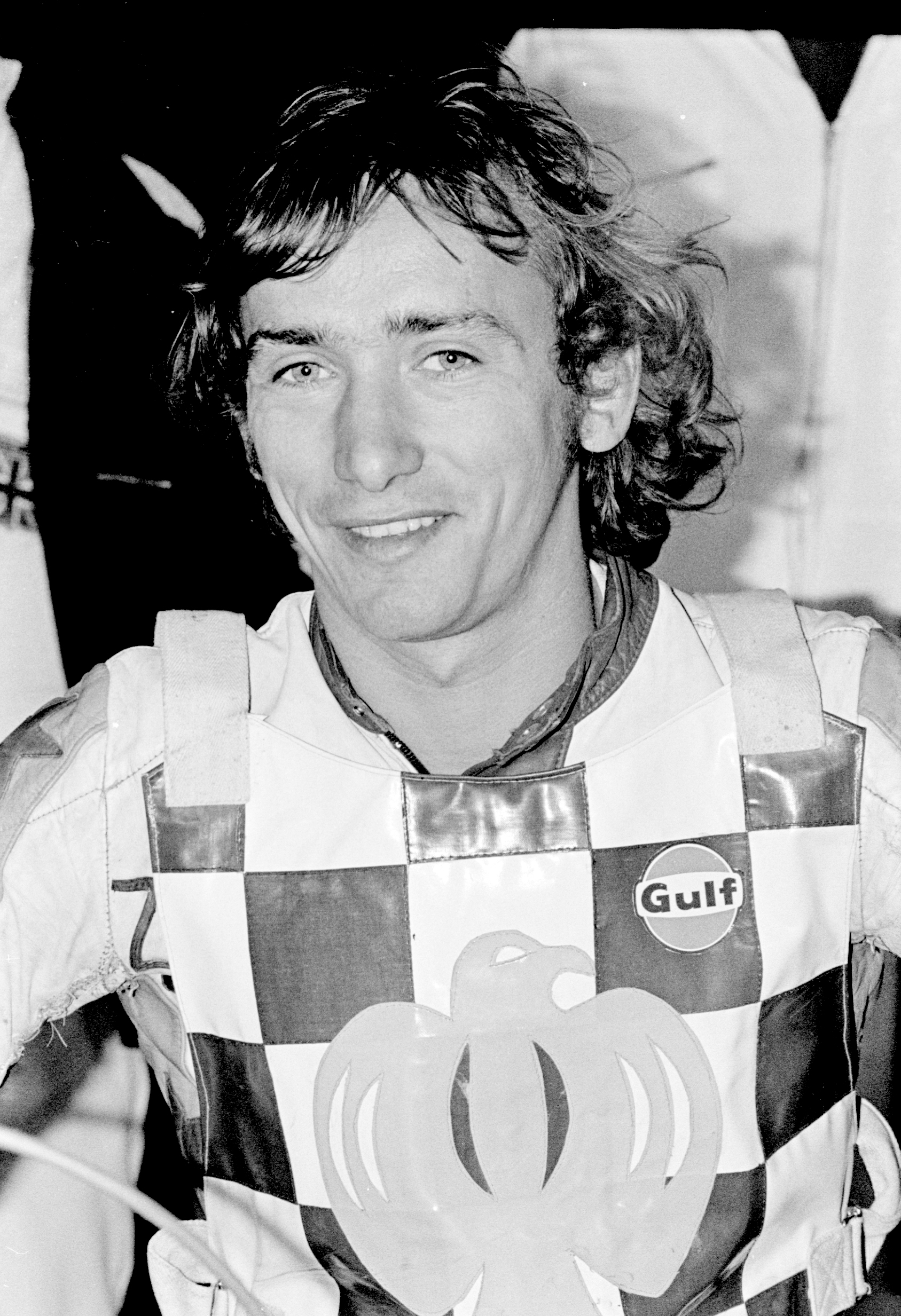
- Zenon Plech (1972 Polish champion)

The 1972 Polish Speedway season was the 1972 season of motorcycle speedway in Poland.

== Individual ==
=== Polish Individual Speedway Championship ===
The 1972 Individual Speedway Polish Championship final was held on 1 October at Bydgoszcz.

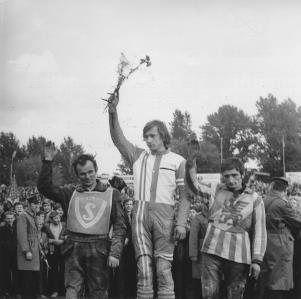
1972 Polish Championship Podium

Pos.	Rider	Club	Total	Points
1	Zenon Plech	Stal Gorzów Wlkp.	14	(3,2,3,3,3)
2	Paweł Waloszek	Śląsk Świętochłowice	13	(3,1,3,3,3)
3	Henryk Glücklich	Polonia Bydgoszcz	12	(3,3,3,3,d)
4	Henryk Żyto	Wybrzeże Gdańsk	11	(1,2,2,3,3)
5	Bogdan Szuluk	Stal Toruń	9	(2,–,3,1,3)
6	Marek Cieślak	Włókniarz Częstochowa	9	(2,3,u,2,2)
7	Jerzy Gryt	Rybnik	9	(3,2,1,1,2)
8	Stanisław Skowron	Kolejarz Opole	7	(0,3,1,1,2)
9	Stanisław Kasa	Polonia Bydgoszcz	7	(2,u,2,2,1)
10	Józef Jarmuła	Śląsk Świętochłowice	6	(1,3,2,d,d)
11	Andrzej Tkocz	ROW Rybnik	6	(u,2,2,0,2)
12	Piotr Bruzda	Sparta Wrocław	6	(2,0,1,2,1)
13	Zbigniew Marcinkowski	Zgrzeblarki Z. Góra	6	(1,1,1,2,1)
14	Andrzej Jurczynski	Włókniarz Częstochowa	1	(w,1,–,–,–)
15	Zdzisław Dobrucki	Unia Leszno	0	(u,–,–,–,–)
16	Jerzy Kowalski	Unia Leszno	0	(u,–,–,–,–)
17	Jan Mucha (res)	Śląsk Świętochłowice		(ns)

=== Golden Helmet ===
The 1972 Golden Golden Helmet (Polish: Turniej o Złoty Kask, ZK) organised by the Polish Motor Union (PZM) was the 1972 event for the league's leading riders.

Calendar

Date	Venue	Winner
13 IV	Częstochowa	Marek Cieślak (Częstochowa)
20 IV	Gorzów Wlkp.	Paweł Waloszek (Świętochłowice)
25 IV	Opole	Edward Jancarz (Gorzów Wlkp.)
8 VII	Bydgoszcz	Henryk Glücklich (Bydgoszcz)
8 VI	Chorzów	Marek Cieślak (Częstochowa)
10 VIII	Poznań	Jerzy Gryt (Rybnik)
16 VIII	Wrocław	Marek Cieślak (Częstochowa)
17 IX	Zielona Góra	Edward Jancarz (Gorzów Wlkp.)

Final classification Note: Result from final score was subtracted with two the weakest events.

Pos.	Rider	Club	Total	CZE	GOR	OPO	BYD	CHO	POZ	WRO	ZIE
1	Edward Jancarz	Stal Gorzów Wlkp.	80	13	13	15	13	3	11	12	14
2	Henryk Glücklich	Polonia Bydgoszcz	78	14	13	11	15	8	12	13	6
3	Marek Cieślak	Włókniarz Częstochowa	72	14	5	10	6	13	9	15	11
4	Zenon Plech	Stal Gorzów Wlkp.	68	-	10	6	9	12	13	12	12
5	Paweł Waloszek	Śląsk Świętochłowice	63	8	14	10	6	12	7	-	12
6	Jerzy Gryt	ROW Rybnik	60	12	6	-	11	-	14	7	10
7	Zdzisław Dobrucki	Unia Leszno	43	10	7	6	9	-	5	4	6
8	Zbigniew Marcinkowski	Zgrzeblarki Zielona Góra	40	4	4	6	8	5	7	7	8
9	Antoni Woryna	ROW Rybnik	37	4	5	8	3	9	5	5	5
10	Piotr Bruzda	Sparta Wrocław	34	4	6	5	-	3	4	10	5

=== Junior Championship ===
- winner - Bernard Jąder

=== Silver Helmet ===
- winner - Andrzej Tkocz

== Team ==
=== Team Speedway Polish Championship ===
The 1972 Team Speedway Polish Championship was the 1972 edition of the Team Polish Championship.

KS ROW Rybnik won the gold medal. The team included Antoni Woryna, Jerzy Gryt and Andrzej Wyglenda.

=== First League ===
Pos	Club	Pts	W	D	L	+/−
1	ROW Rybnik	23	11	1	2	+241
2	Polonia Bydgoszcz	16	8	0	6	+31
3	Śląsk Świętochłowice	16	7	2	5	+4
4	Włókniarz Częstochowa	15	7	1	6	–54
5	Stal Gorzów Wielkopolski	14	7	0	7	+15
6	Kolejarz Opole	11	5	1	8	–21
7	Zgrzeblarki Zielona Góra	9	4	1	9	–60
8	Sparta Wrocław	8	4	0	10	–156

=== Second League ===
Pos	Club	Pts	W	D	L	+/−
1	Unia Leszno	24	12	0	2	+182
2	Wybrzeże Gdańsk	18	9	0	5	+161
3	Stal Toruń	16	8	0	6	+24
4	Unia Tarnów	14	7	0	7	+89
5	Stal Rzeszów	14	7	0	7	–78
6	Motor Lublin	12	6	0	8	–84
7	Start Gniezno	8	4	0	10	–179
8	Gwardia Łódź	6	3	0	11	–115
