= Sándor Lévai =

Hungarian speedway rider

- Born: 16 July 1935; Debrecen, Hungary
- Died: 5 October 2009 (aged 74)
- Nationality: Hungarian

Career history
- 1963: Stoke Potters
- 1964: Norwich Stars
- 1965–1968: Belle Vue Aces
- 1969–1971: Newport Wasps
- 1972–1973: Ipswich Witches
- 1974–1975: Cradley United

Individual honours
- 1951, 1952 1953, 1954 1955, 1956: Hungarian Champion

Katalin Sándor Lévai (16 July 1935 – 5 October 2009) was a Hungarian international motorcycle speedway rider. He earned 1 cap for the Hungary national speedway team and one cap for the England national speedway team.

== Speedway career ==
Lévai was a six-time champion of Hungary, winning the Hungarian Championship for six consecutive years from 1951 to 1956. He fled Hungary during the Hungarian Revolution of 1956.

Lévai rode in the top tiers of British Speedway from 1963 to 1975, riding for various clubs.

After spells at Stoke Potters and Norwich Stars, Lévai joined Belle Vue Aces and stayed with them for four seasons. After Belle Vue, he joined Newport Wasps and rode as their number one rider.

Lévai had the unusual distinction of being the only non-Commonwealth rider capped by the England national speedway team.
