= József Tabaka =

Hungarian motorcycle speedway rider

- Born: 17 September 1989 (age 37); Debrecen, Hungary
- Nationality: Hungarian

Career history

Hungary
- 2006–2010: Speedway Miskolc

Great Britain
- 2010, 2012–2013: Edinburgh Monarchs

Poland
- 2011–2012: Kraków
- 2013: Krosno
- 2016: Rzeszów

Individual honours
- 2010, 2012, 2016, 2017: Hungarian Champion

Team honours
- 2013: Premier League Fours

József Tabaka (born 17 September 1989) is a Hungarian former motorcycle speedway rider. He earned 5 caps for the Hungary national speedway team.

== Career ==
Tabaka started racing in the British leagues during the 2010 Premier League speedway season, when riding for the Edinburgh Monarchs. He stayed with Edinburgh in 2012 and 2013 and was part of the Edinburgh team that won the Premier League Four-Team Championship, which was held on 14 July 2013, at the East of England Arena.

In 2017, Tabaka became the Hungarian national champion for the fourth time.

== Honours ==
=== World Championships ===
- Individual Under-21 World Championship
  - 2009 - (Croatia) Goričan - 13th place (3 pts), as track reserve rode in two heat
  - 2010 - 10th place in the Qualifying Round 1

== See also ==
- Hungary national speedway team
- U21
