= József Petrikovics =

Hungarian speedway rider

- Born: 5 October 1964 (age 62); Hungary
- Nationality: Hungarian

Career history

Poland
- 1991–1993: Krosno
- 1994: Grudziądz

Individual honours
- 1992: Hungarian Champion

József Petrikovics (born 5 October 1964) is a Hungarian former international speedway rider. He was a member of the Hungary national speedway team.

== Speedway career ==
Petrikovics was a member of the Hungarian national team that toured the United Kingdom in 1991.

Petrikovics was the champion of Hungary, winning the Hungarian Championship in 1992, and one year later competed in the last Speedway World Pairs Championship] at the 1993 Speedway World Pairs Championship in Vojens, Denmark.

== World final appearances ==
=== World Pairs Championship ===
- 1993 - (Denmark) Vojens, Speedway Center (with Antal Kocso / Zoltán Adorján) - 7th - 10pts
