= 1972 Speedway World Pairs Championship =

5th edition of the World motorcycle speedway Pairs Championship

1972 World Pairs Championship

Seasons
- ← 1971 1973 →

The 1972 Speedway World Pairs Championship was the third official FIM Speedway World Pairs Championship. The final took place in Borås, Sweden.

The championship was won by England (24 points) who beat New Zealand after Run-Off (24 points also) and Sweden B (22 points) who beat Sweden A after a run-off.

== Semifinal 1 ==
- (England) Wimbledon Stadium, London
- 11 May

| Pos. | Team | Rider | Points |
|---|---|---|---|
| 1st | New Zealand (27 pts) | Ivan Mauger | 15 |
| 1st | New Zealand (27 pts) | Ronnie Moore | 12 |
| 2nd | England (25 pts) | Ray Wilson | 14 |
| 2nd | England (25 pts) | Terry Betts | 11 |
| 3rd | Sweden (22 pts) | Anders Michanek | 11 |
| 3rd | Sweden (22 pts) | Bengt Jansson | 11 |
| 4 | Scotland (15 pts) | Jim McMillan | 9 |
| 4 | Scotland (15 pts) | George Hunter | 6 |
| 5 | Australia (14 pts) | Geoff Curtis | 7 |
| 5 | Australia (14 pts) | Garry Middleton | 7 |
| 6 | Denmark (9 pts) | Ole Olsen | 7 |
| 6 | Denmark (9 pts) | Paul Rosenkilde | 2 |
| 7 | Norway (9 pts) | Øyvind S. Berg | 6 |
| 7 | Norway (9 pts) | Reidar Eide | 3 |

== Semifinal 2 ==
- (Hungary) Gázvezeték Street Sports Complex, Debrecen
- 14 May

| Pos. | Team | Rider | Points |
|---|---|---|---|
| 1st | Poland (? pts) | Zbigniew Marcinkowski | ? |
| 1st | Poland (? pts) | Wiktor Jastrzębski | ? |
| 2nd | Hungary (? pts) | ? | ? |
| 2nd | Hungary (? pts) | ? | ? |
| 3rd | Czechoslovakia (21 pts) | Petr Ondrasik | 11 |
| 3rd | Czechoslovakia (21 pts) | Jan Verner | 10 |
| 4 | ? (? pts) | ? | ? |
| 4 | ? (? pts) | ? | ? |
| 5 | ? (? pts) | ? | ? |
| 5 | ? (? pts) | ? | ? |
| 6 | ? (? pts) | ? | ? |
| 6 | ? (? pts) | ? | ? |
| 7 | ? (? pts) | ? | ? |
| 7 | ? (? pts) | ? | ? |

== World final ==
- (Sweden) Ryavallen, Borås
- 1 June 1972

| Placing | Pair / Rider Name | Total | 1 | 2 | 3 | 4 | 5 | 6 | 7 | 8 | 9 | 10 | 11 | 12 | 13 | 14 | 15 | 16 | 17 | 18 | 19 | 20 | 21 |
| 1 | England | 24 | | | | | | | 6 | | | | | | | 14 | | | | | | | 24 |
| 1 | (11) Ray Wilson | 15+3 | | | 3 | | | | 1 | | | | 3 | | 3 | | | 2 | | | | | 3 |
| 1 | (12) Terry Betts | 9 | | | 2 | | | | 0 | | | | 1 | | 1 | | | 3 | | | | | 2* |
| 2 | New Zealand | 24 | | | | | | | 8 | | | | | | | 16 | | | | | | | 24 |
| 2 | (13) Ivan Mauger | 14+F | | | | 2 | | | 2 | | | 3 | | | | 1 | | | 3 | | 3 |
| 2 | (14) Ronnie Moore | 10 | | | | 1 | | | 3 | | | 2 | | | | 2 | | | 0 | | 2 |
| 3 | Sweden B | 22 | | | | | | | 8 | | | | | | | 16 | | | | | | | 22 |
| 3 | (7) Bernt Persson | 13+3 | | 2 | | | | 3 | | | 3 | | | | | 3 | | | | 2 | | | 0 |
| 3 | (8) Hasse Holmqvist | 9 | | 1 | | | | 2 | | | 2 | | | | | 0 | | | | 3 | | | 1 |
| 4 | Sweden A | 22 | | | | | | | 8 | | | | | | | 14 | | | | | | | 22 |
| 4 | (5) Anders Michanek | 15+2 | | 3 | | | 3 | | | 3 | | | | | 2 | | | | 1 | | | 3 |
| 4 | (6) Bengt Jansson | 7 | | 0 | | | 2 | | | 1 | | | | | 0 | | | | 2 | | | 2 |
| 5 | Poland | 15 | | | | | | | 6 | | | | | | | 10 | | | | | | | 15 |
| 5 | (1) Zbigniew Marcinkowski | 13 | 3 | | | 3 | | | | 2 | | | 2 | | | | 3 | | | F |
| 5 | (2) Wiktor Jastrzębski | 2 | 0 | | | 0 | | | | 0 | | | X | | | | 2 | | | X |
| 6 | Czechoslovakia | 12 | | | | | | | 4 | | | | | | | 10 | | | | | | | 12 |
| 6 | (3) Jan Holub I | 5 | 1 | | | | 0 | | | | 1 | | | 3 | | | | 0 | | | 0 |
| 6 | (4) Jiri Stancl | 7 | 2 | | | | 1 | | | | 0 | | | 2 | | | | 1 | | | 1 |
| 7 | Hungary | 6 | | | | | | | 2 | | | | | | | 4 | | | | | | | 6 |
| 7 | (9) Ferenc Radacsi | 6 | | | 1 | | | 1 | | | | 1 | | 1 | | | 1 | | | | | 1 |
| 7 | (10) Pal Perenyi | 0 | | | 0 | | | 0 | | | | 0 | | 0 | | | 0 | | | | | X |
| Placing | Pair / Rider Name | Total | 1 | 2 | 3 | 4 | 5 | 6 | 7 | 8 | 9 | 10 | 11 | 12 | 13 | 14 | 15 | 16 | 17 | 18 | 19 | 20 | 21 |

m - exclusion for exceeding two minute time allowance • t - exclusion for touching the tapes • x - other exclusion • e - retired or mechanical failure • f - fell
ns - non-starter • nc - non-classify

| gate A - inside | gate B | gate C | gate D - outside |

== See also ==
- 1972 Individual Speedway World Championship
- 1972 Speedway World Team Cup
- motorcycle speedway
- 1972 in sports
