= Attila Stefáni =

Hungarian speedway rider

Attila Stefáni (rode as Mark Frost)
- Born: 6 November 1973 (age 53)
- Nationality: Hungarian

Career history

Poland
- 1999: Kraków
- 2000–2001, 2005: Rawicz
- 2002–2003: Lublin
- 2006–2007: Miskolc

Denmark
- 2004: Outrup

Great Britain
- 1996: Oxford

Individual honours
- 2002: Hungarian national champion

Attila Stefáni alias Mark Frost (born 6 November 1973) is a former motorcycle speedway rider from Hungary. He earned eight caps for the Hungary national speedway team.

== Career ==
In 2002, Stefáni won the Hungarian title to become the Hungarian national champion.

Stefáni rode for the Oxford Cheetahs in 1996, under the assumed name Mark Frost also assuming a South African nationality. Frost had been recommended to Oxford by Paul Hurry following a tour of South Africa. He was released by Oxford the following season.

Stefáni first rode under his real name at the 1999 World Team Cup semi-final.

== Results ==
- Team World Championship (Speedway World Team Cup and Speedway World Cup)
  - 1999 - =9th place
  - 2000 - =13th place
  - 2001 - 10th place
  - 2002 - 10th place
  - 2004 - 8th place
  - 2005 - 3rd place in Qualifying round 2
  - 2007 - 4th place in Qualifying round 2
- Individual European Championship
  - 2003 - (Czech Republic) Slaný - 15th place (3 pts)
- European Pairs Championship
  - 2004 - (Hungary) Debrecen - 4th place (4 pts)
- European Club Champions' Cup
  - 2004 - (Slovenia) Ljubljana - 5th place (6 pts)

== See also ==
- Hungary national speedway team
