= 2003 Speedway World Cup Qualification =

2003 Speedway World Cup

Seasons
- ← 2002 2004 →

The 2003 Speedway World Cup Qualification (SWC) was a series of motorcycle speedway meetings used to determine the three national teams to qualify for the 2003 Speedway World Cup. According to the FIM rules the top nine nations from the 2002 Speedway World Cup were automatically qualified.

== Results ==
- Qualifying round
- LVA Daugavpils

Pos.	National team	Pts.
1	Germany	65
2	Slovenia	62+4
3	Latvia	62+3
4	Italy	39
5	Austria	19

== Heat details ==
- Qualifying round
- 11 May 2003
- LVA Daugavpils, Latvijas Spidveja Centrs

Placing	Team / Rider name	Total	1	2	3	4	5	6	7	8	9	10	11	12	13	14	15	16	17	18	19	20	21	22	23	24	25	26
1	Germany	65	3	7	9	13	16	18	20	24	25	28	29	30	34	38	41	44	48	48	51	54	54	57	59	61	65
1	(1) Mirko Wolter	19	3							4						4			4								4
1	(2) Thomas Stange	8		4							1						3			X			N
1	(3) Ronny Weis	12			2							3	1								3			3
1	(4) Matthias Schultz	12				4		2						1								3			2
1	(5) Christian Hefenbrock	14					3		2						4			3								2
2	Slovenia	62+4	0	3	6	8	12	15	19	22	26	26	30	34	34	35	35	39	41	44	46	47	51	55	58	61	62
2	(1) Matej Žagar	15	X					3					4					4					4					4
2	(2) Izak Šantej	17		3					4					4					2					4
2	(3) Jernej Kolenko	12			3					3					E					3					3
2	(4) Ales Dolinar	12				2					4					1					2					3
2	(5) Denis Stojs	6					4					E					X					1					1
3	Latvia	62+3	2	4	8	11	12	13	16	18	20	24	26	29	32	34	36	38	41	45	49	51	53	55	55	59	62
3	(1) Andrejs Koroļevs	17	2									4		3						4						4		3
3	(2) Vladimir Voronkov	13		2				1							3						4						3
3	(3) Nikolai Kokin	13			4				3							2						2	2
3	(4) Denis Popovich	11				3				2							2	2						2
3	(5) Alexander Biznya	8					1				2		2						3						0
4	Italy	39	4	4	5	5	7	11	11	11	11	12	15	17	18	21	25	25	26	28	28	28	31	32	36	37	39
4	(1) Armando Castagna	15	4						X				3				4				E				4
4	(2) Alessandro Dalla Valle	0		0						X			-									0				-
4	(3) Christian Miotello	5			1						0			2				N									2
4	(4) Simone Terenzani	7				X						1			1				1				3			1
4	(5) Emiliano Sanchez	12					2	4								3				2				1
5	Austria	19	1	2	2	3	3	3	4	5	8	10	10	10	12	12	13	13	13	13	14	18	18	18	19	19	19
5	(1) Friedrich Wallner	10	1								3				2							4		X
5	(2) Markus Pichler	5		1								2				X		E			1				1
5	(3) Ivan Nagar	1			0			E									1		E							N
5	(4) Rene Pfeiffer	2				1			1				E							E							N
5	(5) Olivier Ozelt	1					0			1				0							-		N
Placing	Team / Rider name	Total	1	2	3	4	5	6	7	8	9	10	11	12	13	14	15	16	17	18	19	20	21	22	23	24	25	26

M - exclusion for exceeding two minute time allowance • T - exclusion for touching the tapes • X - other exclusion • E - retired or mechanical failure • F - fell

Helmet colours were permanent for each team (red, blue, white, yellow/black and green). Colours in tables show gate positions:
gate A – inside	gate B	gate C	gate D	gate E – outside

== See also ==
- 2003 Speedway World Cup
