= 2002 Speedway World Cup Qualification =

2002 Speedway World Cup

Seasons
- ← 2001 2003 →

The 2002 Speedway World Cup Qualification (SWC) was an event of motorcycle speedway meetings used to determine the two national teams who qualify for the 2002 Speedway World Cup. According to the FIM rules the top ten nations from the 2001 Speedway World Cup were automatically qualified.

== Results ==
- Qualifying round
- GER Abensberg

Pos.	National team	Pts.
1	Slovenia	49
2	Germany	46
3	Latvia	17
4	Austria	8

== Heat details ==
- Qualifying round
- 20 May 2002
- GER Abensberg, Motorstadion

Placing	Team / Rider Name	Total
1	Slovenia	49
1	(1) Izak Šantej	12
1	(2) Jernej Kolenko	6
1	(3) Ales Dolinar	4
1	(4) Matej Ferjan	15
1	(5) Matej Žagar	12
2	Germany	46
2	(1) Robert Barth	12
2	(2) Matthias Kröger	12
2	(3) Joachim Kugelmann	11
2	(4) Jorg Pingel	11
2	(5) Mirko Wolter	0
3	Latvia	17
3	(1) Aleksander Biznya	3
3	(2) Nikolai Kokin	4
3	(3) Władimir Woronkow	4
3	(4) Aleksander Ivanow	1
3	(5) Leonid Paura	5
4	Austria	8
4	(1) Walter Nebel	3
4	(2) Manuel Hauzinger	0
4	(3) Fredrich Wallner	2
4	(4) Mario Ozelt	2
4	(5) Rene Pfeiffer	1

== See also ==
- 2002 Speedway World Cup
