= 1990 Speedway World Pairs Championship =

21st edition of the World motorcycle speedway Pairs Championship

1990 World Pairs Championship

Seasons
- ← 1989 1991 →

The 1990 Speedway World Pairs Championship was the twenty-first FIM Speedway World Pairs Championship.

The final took place at the Ellermühle Stadium in Landshut, Germany. The championship Final was dominated by favourites Denmark and the less fancied Australia. Danes Jan O. Pedersen and Hans Nielsen scored 43 points to narrowly beat Australians Todd Wiltshire and Leigh Adams who scored 41. Hungary (Zoltán Adorján and Sándor Tihanyi) finished a distant third on 33 points. Sweden (Jimmy Nilsen and Per Jonsson) also finished on 33 points, though as Hungary scored three heat wins to one for the Swedes they were awarded third place.

== Semifinal 1 ==
- (Austria) Stadion Wiener Neustadt, Wiener Neustadt
- 16 June

Pos.	Team	Rider	Points
1st	England - 45	Simon Cross - (4,4,4,3,5,4)	24
1st	England - 45	Kelvin Tatum - (5,5,5,5,x,1)	21
2nd	Sweden - 40	Per Jonsson - (3,3,4,4,3,3)	20
2nd	Sweden - 40	Jimmy Nilsen - (2,2,5,5,4,2)	20
3rd	Australia - 39	Todd Wiltshire - (4,5,4,2,5,5)	25
3rd	Australia - 39	Leigh Adams - (1,4,5,4,e,0)	14
4	New Zealand - 41*	Mitch Shirra - (3,5,3,3,5,5)	24
4	New Zealand - 41*	David Bargh - (5,4,2,x,2,4)	17
5	Austria - 28	Heinrich Schatzer - (3,3,3,2,3,3)	17
5	Austria - 28	Toni Pilotto - (2,2,1,1,4,1)	11
6	Italy - 20	Armando Dal Chiele - (2,1,1,2,3,2)	11
6	Italy - 20	Armando Castagna - (e,0,3,5,2,0)	9
7	Soviet Union - 27*	Rif Saitgareev - (1,3,0,4,4,5)	17
7	Soviet Union - 27*	Vladimir Trofimov - (0,2,2,3,e,3)	10
8	Yugoslavia - 14	Gregor Pintar - (0,0,2,1,1,4)	8
8	Yugoslavia - 14	Martin Peterca - (1,1,0,0,2,2)	6
9	Poland - 9	Piotr Świst - (5,f,-,-,-,-)	5
9	Poland - 9	Ryszard Dołomisiewicz - (4,x,-,-,-,-)	4

== Semifinal 2 ==
- (Czech Republic) Markéta Stadium, Prague
- 17 June

Pos.	Team	Rider	Points
1st	Denmark - 50	Hans Nielsen - (2,4,4,5,5,5)	25
1st	Denmark - 50	Jan O. Pedersen - (4,5,5,3,4,4)	25
2nd	United States - 44	Ronnie Correy - (5,4,4,3,5,3)	24
2nd	United States - 44	Kelly Moran - (3,3,3,5,4,2)	20
3rd	Hungary - 37	Zoltán Adorján - (5,5,1,5,5,1)	22
3rd	Hungary - 37	Sándor Tihanyi - (4,2,3,4,2,0)	15
4	Czechoslovakia - 38*	Roman Matoušek - (3,5,5,4,4,0)	21
4	Czechoslovakia - 38*	Antonín Kasper Jr. - (2,3,2,2,3,5)	17
5	Finland - 31	Olli Tyrväinen - (4,4,0,4,3,4)	19
5	Finland - 31	Kai Niemi - (5,2,2,0,2,1)	12
6	Norway - 24	Lars Gunnestad - (3,1,5,1,3,2)	15
6	Norway - 24	Arnt Førland - (0,0,4,0,2,3)	9
7	Bulgaria - 21	Nikolaj Manev - (1,2,0,3,1,5)	12
7	Bulgaria - 21	Zdravko Iordanov - (2,0,1,2,0,4)	9
8	Netherlands - 18	Ron Koppe - (x/2m,1,3,1,1,3)	9
8	Netherlands - 18	Rene Elzinga - (1,3,2,2,0,1)	9
9	France - 7	David Ochocki - (1,1,1,1,1,2)	7
9	France - 7	Patrice Blondy - (0,0,0,0,0,0)	0

== World final ==
- (West Germany) Ellermühle Stadium, Landshut
- 21 July
- Attendance: 10,000

Pos.	Team	Rider	Points
1st	Denmark - 43	Jan O. Pedersen - (4,4,2,5,5,4)	24
1st	Denmark - 43	Hans Nielsen - (X,2,5,4,3,5)	19
2nd	Australia (41 pts)	Todd Wiltshire - (5,5,3,4,5,3)	25
2nd	Australia (41 pts)	Leigh Adams - (3,1,4,2,4,2)	16
3rd	Hungary (33 pts)	Zoltán Adorján - (5,5,4,5,1,1)	21
3rd	Hungary (33 pts)	Sándor Tihanyi - (3,2,1,3,3,0)	12
4	Sweden (33 pts)	Jimmy Nilsen - (4,4,1,3,4,2)	17
4	Sweden (33 pts)	Per Jonsson - (2,2,3,2,5,1)	16
5	New Zealand (32 pts)	Mitch Shirra - (4,5,4,1,4,5)	23
5	New Zealand (32 pts)	David Bargh - (2,0,5,X,2,0)	9
6	United States (28 pts)	Ronnie Correy - (5,0,0,5,2,3)	15
6	United States (28 pts)	Kelly Moran - (1,3,3,1,1,4)	13
7	Czechoslovakia (21 pts)	Antonín Kasper Jr. - (0,3,2,3,0,3)	11
7	Czechoslovakia (21 pts)	Roman Matoušek - (1,1,0,2,1,5)	10
8	England (20 pts)	Kelvin Tatum - (3,4,5,1,4,3)	20
8	England (20 pts)	Simon Cross - (X,-,-,-,-,-)	0
9	West Germany (15 pts)	Klaus Lausch - (2,3,2,4,2,2)	15
9	West Germany (15 pts)	Gerd Riss - (F,-,-,-,-,-)	0

== See also ==
- 1990 Individual Speedway World Championship
- 1990 Speedway World Team Cup
- motorcycle speedway
- 1990 in sports
