= Zoltán Adorján =

Hungarian speedway rider (born 1961)

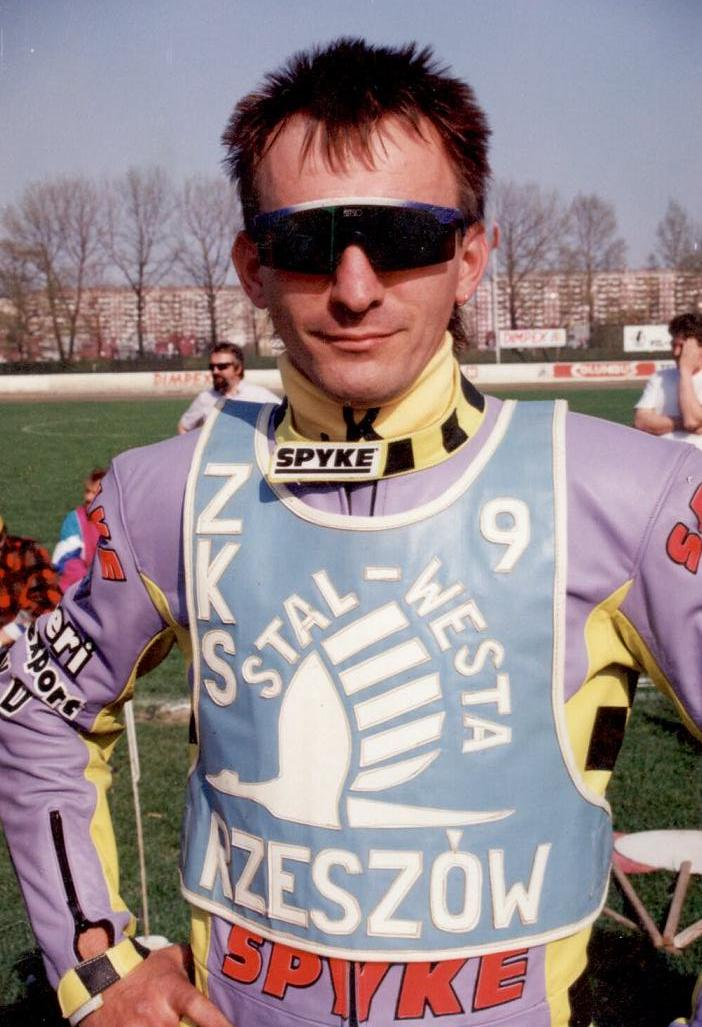
- Born: 15 November 1961 (age 65); Debrecen, Hungary
- Nationality: Hungarian

Career history

Poland
- 1991–1995: Rzeszów
- 1996: Kraków
- 1997: Grudziądz
- 1998–2000: Lublin

Individual honours
- 1989, 1995: Continental Champion
- 13 times: Hungarian champion
- 1991: German Champion
- 1996: Argentinian Champion

Team honours
- 1990: World Pairs Championship bronze

Zoltán Adorján (born 15 November 1961) is Hungarian former motorcycle speedway rider. He is a 13-time Hungarian national champion and earned 51 caps for the Hungary national speedway team.

== Career ==
Adorján came to prominence when he reached the 1985 Individual Speedway World Championship final. Four years later in 1989 he won the Continental Speedway Final on the way to reaching his second World final.

The following year, Adorján teamed up with Sándor Tihanyi to secure a first medal at world level for Hungary when they won a bronze at the 1990 Speedway World Pairs Championship in Germany. He was a member of the Hungarian national team that toured the United Kingdom in 1991 and competed in the last Speedway World Pairs Championship] at the 1993 Speedway World Pairs Championship in Vojens, Denmark.

On 30 July 1995, Adorján won the Continental Final, which formed part of the 1996 Speedway Grand Prix Qualification. It was the second time he had won the final having previously won it in 1989. In 1996, he won the Argentine Championship.

== World Final Appearances ==
=== Individual World Championship ===
- 1985 – (England) Bradford, Odsal Stadium – 14th – 2pts
- 1989 – (Germany) Munich, Olympiastadion – 15th – 4pts
- 1990 – (England) Bradford, Odsal Stadium – 16th – 2pts

=== World Pairs Championship ===
- 1988 – (England) Bradford, Odsal Stadium (with Antal Kocso) – 6th – 25pts
- 1989 – (Poland) Leszno, Alfred Smoczyk Stadium (with Antal Kocso) – 6th – 22pts
- 1990 – (West Germany) Landshut, Ellermühle Stadium (with Sándor Tihanyi) – 3rd – 37pts
- 1993 – (Denmark) Vojens, Speedway Center (with József Petrikovics / Antal Kocso) – 7th – 10pts

== See also ==
- Hungary national speedway team
