= Graeme Stapleton =

New Zealand speedway rider

- Born: 1 February 1946 (age 80); Christchurch, New Zealand
- Nationality: New Zealand

Career history
- 1971-1974, 1977-1978: Wimbledon Dons
- 1971: Canterbury Crusaders
- 1978-1979: Newcastle Diamonds
- 1979: Hull Vikings

Team honours
- 1973: World Pairs finalist
- 1974: London Cup

Graeme James Stapleton (born 1 February 1946) is a former international motorcycle speedway rider from New Zealand. He earned 20 caps for the New Zealand national speedway team.

== Speedway career ==
Stapleton competed in motocross in New Zealand in the 1960s and from mid 1967 to 1969 he lived in England and rode in motocross events in the UK and Europe. After returning to New Zealand he won the New Zealand 250cc motocross championship.

In November 1970, Stapleton began riding speedway at the Templeton track in Christchurch. The following year, he went to England and rode for the Canterbury Crusaders in the British League Division Two. He was a junior with Wimbledon Dons before making six appearances in 1971 and was a member of the team for the next three years. In 1975 and 1976, he did not ride in the British League because he was in New Zealand helping his business partner Ronnie Moore after he had a serious accident. Stapleton resumed riding in for Wimbledon in 1977 and 1978, and for the Newcastle Diamonds in 1978 and 1979, the latter after a spell riding in the United States. He also had two matches for the Hull Vikings in 1979.

Stapleton reached the final of the Speedway World Pairs Championship in the 1973 Speedway World Pairs Championship, and represented New Zealand in other team events from 1972 to 1976.

When he returned to New Zealand, Stapleton continued to ride at the Ruapuna speedway track in Christchurch until 1982. After this, he drove three quarter midget cars at the track for several seasons.

== World Final appearances ==
=== World Pairs Championship ===
- 1973 - (Sweden) Borås (with Ivan Mauger) - 7th - 10pts
