= 1993 Speedway World Pairs Championship =

24th and last edition of the World motorcycle speedway Pairs Championship

Speedway World Pairs Championship

The 1993 Speedway World Pairs Championship was the twenty-fourth and last FIM Speedway World Pairs Championship. The final took place in Vojens, Denmark. The championship was won by Sweden (26 points) who beat United States (23 points) and host team Denmark (21 points).

== Qualification round ==
- (Austria) Stadion Wiener Neustadt, Wiener Neustadt
- date ?

1st	2nd	3rd
Russia - 26; Rif Saitgareev - 15; Oleg Kurguskin - 11; Rinat Mardanshin - 0	Austria - 20+3; Andreas Bössner - 13+3; Toni Pilotto - 7	France - 20+2; Philippe Bergé - 15+2; Christophe Dubernard - 5

4th	5th	6th	7th
Latvia - 19; Nikolay Kokin - 9 Andrey Korolyov - 7 Vladimir Voronkov - 3	Ukraine - 18; Vladimir Trofimov - 13; Aleksandr Lyatosinskiy - 4 Vladimir Kolodiy - 1	Slovenia - 16; Gregor Pintar - 8 Martin Peterca - 4 Krešo Omerzel - 4	Netherlands - 2 Robert Steman - 1 Henk Bangma - 1

== Semifinal 1 ==
- (Poland) Polonia Bydgoszcz Stadium, Bydgoszcz
- 6 June

1st	2nd	3rd
England - 25+3; Andy Smith - 14; Joe Screen - 10+3; Gary Havelock - 1	Sweden - 25+2; Per Jonsson - 14+2; Tony Rickardsson - 11; Henrik Gustafsson - ns	Poland - 23; Tomasz Gollob - 17; Jacek Krzyżaniak - 5 Sławomir Drabik - 1

4th	5th	6th	7th
New Zealand - 16; Mitch Shirra - 11; Mark Thorpe - 5 Gary Allan - ns	Norway - 14; Lars Gunnestad - 10; Rune Holta - 3 Einar Kyllingstad - 1	Finland - 13; Vesa Ylinen - 12; Kai Laukkanen - 1 Roy Malminheimo - 0	Austria - 10; Andreas Bössner - 5 Heinrich Schatzer - 4 Franz Leitner - 1

== Semifinal 2 ==
- (Hungary) Borsod Volán Stadion, Miskolc
- 6 June

1st	2nd	3rd
United States - 25; Sam Ermolenko - 14; Ronnie Correy - 11; Greg Hancock - 0	Hungary - 23; Zoltán Adorján - 18; József Petrikovics - 4 Zoltan Hajdu - 4	Australia - 20; Leigh Adams - 11; Craig Boyce - 5 Jason Lyons - 4

4th	5th	6th	7th
Italy - 19; Armando Castagna - 17; Paolo Salvatelli - 1 Valentino Furlanetto - 1	Germany - 19; Gerd Riss - 13; Robert Barth - 6	Czech Republic - 10; Bohumil Brhel - 5 Roman Matoušek - 3 Vaclav Milik - 2	Russia - 10; Sergey Kuzin - 6 Flyur Kalimullin- 4

== Final ==
- (Denmark) Speedway Center, Vojens
- 1 August

Placing	Pair / Rider Name	Total	1	2	3	4	5	6	7	8	9	10	11	12	13	14	15	16	17	18	19	20	21	22
1	Sweden	26							7							16							26
1	(13) Tony Rickardsson	15				3			2			2				3			2		3
1	(14) Per Jonsson	5				1			-			1				-			3		-
1	(21) Henrik Gustafsson	6							1							3					2
2	(United States) USA	23							8							17							23
2	(5) Sam Ermolenko	9		1			2			2					1				1			2
2	(6) Ronnie Correy	14		2			3			3					3				0			3
2	(17) Greg Hancock	0
3	Denmark	21							8							15							21
3	(11) Hans Nielsen	14			2				3				2		2			3					2
3	(12) Tommy Knudsen	6			3				0				3		0			0					-
3	(20) Brian Karger	1																					1
4	England	17							4							13							17
4	(3) Joe Screen	9	1				-				3			3				2			0
4	(4) Martin Dugard	8	3				0				1			2				1			1
4	(16) Gary Havelock	0					1
5	Poland	15							5							9							15
5	(7) Tomasz Gollob	15		3				2			2					2				3			3
5	(8) Piotr Świst	0		0				0			-					-				-			-
5	(18) Piotr Baron	0									0					0				F			0
6	Australia	13							4							6							13
6	(9) Leigh Adams	7			2			0				0		-			3					2
6	(10) Jason Lyons	5			0			2				1		X			1					1
6	(19) Craig Boyce	1												1
7	Hungary	10							5							7							10
7	(1) Antal Kocso	3	0			3				0			0				-			-
7	(2) Zoltán Adorján	6	1			1				1			-				2			1
7	(15) József Petrikovics	1											1				0			0
Placing	Pair / Rider Name	Total	1	2	3	4	5	6	7	8	9	10	11	12	13	14	15	16	17	18	19	20	21	22

m - exclusion for exceeding two minute time allowance • t - exclusion for touching the tapes • x - other exclusion • e - retired or mechanical failure • f - fell
ns - non-starter • nc - non-classify

gate A - inside	gate B	gate C	gate D - outside

== See also ==
- 1993 Individual Speedway World Championship
- 1993 Speedway World Team Cup
- motorcycle speedway
- 1993 in sports
