= Maks Gregorič =

Slovenian motorcycle speedway rider

- Born: 26 August 1985 (age 41); Ljubljana, Yugoslavia
- Nickname: Max
- Nationality: Slovenian

Career history

Slovenia
- 2005: AMTK Ljubljana

Poland
- 2008: Krosno
- 2009: Rawicz

Great Britain
- 2009–2010: Redcar Bears

Individual honours
- 2009, 2012, 2014: Slovenian Championship silver

Team honours
- 2005: Slovenian club championship

Maks Gregorič (born 26 August 1985) is a former motorcycle speedway rider from Slovenia. He earned 7 caps for the Slovenia national speedway team.

== Career ==
Gregorič was a member of Slovenian national team, winning seven international caps and representing them at four World Cups including the 2009 Speedway World Cup semi finals.

Gregorič rode for the Kolejarz Rawicz in the Polish Second League and started racing in the British leagues during the 2009 Premier League speedway season, when riding for the Redcar Bears and also rode for them during the 2010 season but broke his leg in May and missed the remainder of the season.

Gregorič won the silver medal three times at the Slovenian Championship in 2009, 2012 and 2014.

== Results ==
=== World championships ===
- Team World Championship (Speedway World Team Cup and Speedway World Cup)
  - 2006 - 2nd place in Qualifying round 2
  - 2007 - 4th place in Qualifying round 1
  - 2008 - 3rd place in Qualifying Round 2
  - 2009 - in team squad (on 13 July)
- Team U-21 World Championship (U-21 Speedway World Cup)
  - 2005 - 4th place in Qualifying Round 1 for Hungarian-Slovenian join team

=== European championships ===
- Individual European Championship
  - 2008 - 15th place in Semi-Final 1
  - 2009 - track reserve at Semi-Final 3 (on 25 July)
- European Pairs Championship
  - 2008 - 5th place in Semi-Final 1
  - 2009 - (Hungary) Miskolc - the Final will be on 26 September
- European Club Champions' Cup
  - 2006 - 3rd place in Semi-Final 1 for Ljubljana
  - 2007 - 3rd place in Semi-Final 1 for Ljubljana

== See also ==
- Slovenia national speedway team
- List of Speedway Grand Prix riders
