= Szabolcs Vida =

Hungarian speedway rider

- Nationality: Hungary

Szabolcs Vida is a former Hungarian motorcycle speedway rider who was a member of Hungary's national team.

== Career details ==
- Team World Championship (Speedway World Team Cup and Speedway World Cup)
  - 2003 - 11th place
  - 2004 - 8th place
- Individual Hungarian Championship
  - 2000 - 15th place (1 pt)
  - 2001 - 15th place (5 pts)
  - 2002 - 12th place (15 pts)
  - 2003 - 10th place (21 pts)
  - 2004 - 26th place (4 pts)

== See also ==
- Hungary national speedway team
