= Zbigniew Marcinkowski =

Polish speedway rider

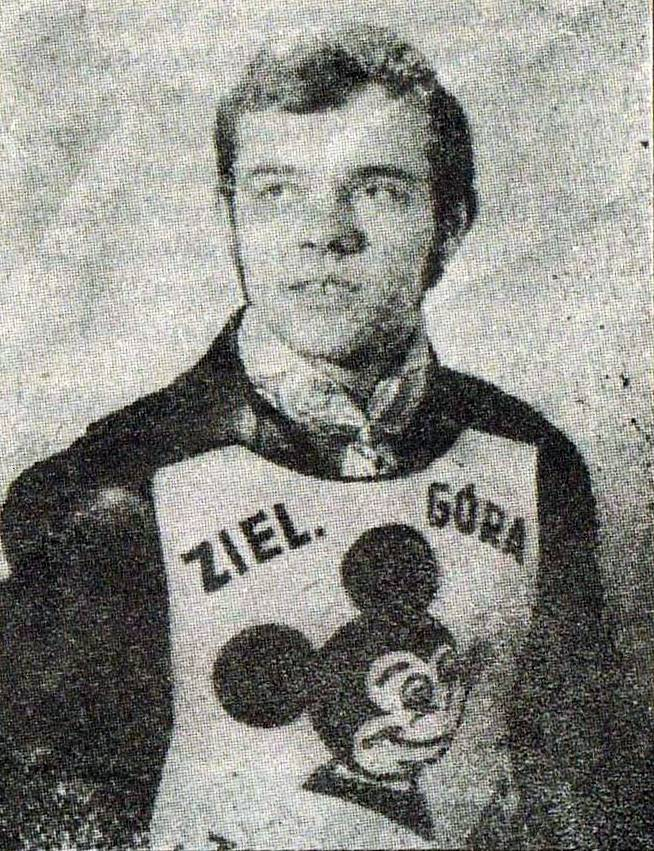
- Born: 6 December 1949 (age 76); Zielona Góra, Poland
- Nationality: Polish

Career history
- 1967-1976: Falubaz Zielona Góra
- 1977-1978: Apator Toruń
- 1979: Śląsk Świętochłowice

Individual honours
- 1970: Poland Silver Helmet Winner

Team honours
- 1973: World Pairs bronze medal

Zbigniew Marcinkowski (born 6 December 1949) is a former international speedway rider from Poland.

== Speedway career ==
Marcinkowski won a bronze medal during the Speedway World Pairs Championship in the 1973 Speedway World Pairs Championship.

== World Final appearances ==
=== World Pairs Championship ===
- 1972 – (Sweden) Borås (with Wiktor Jastrzębski) – 5th – 15pts (13)
- 1973 - (Sweden) Borås (with Zenon Plech) - 3rd - 21pts (7)
