= Sándor Tihanyi =

Hungarian motorcycle speedway rider (born 1963)

- Born: 28 April 1963 (age 63); Debrecen
- Nationality: Hungarian

Career history

Poland
- 1992, 1999: Rzeszów
- 1994-1995: Kraków
- 1996, 2003-2004: Krosno
- 2000: Gdańsk
- 2002: Warszawa
- 2006-2008: Miskolc

Individual honours
- 1999, 2005: Hungarian national champion

Team honours
- 1990: World Pairs bronze

Sándor Tihanyi (born 28 April 1963) is a former motorcycle speedway rider from Hungary. He was a member of Hungary's national team during the 1980s and 1990s.

== Career ==
Tihanyi qualified for the 1988 World Final in Vojens, Denmark, where he finished 15th with three points. He was also a reserve for the 1990 World Final at the Odsal Stadium in Bradford, England, but did not ride in the final.

Tihanyi's greatest achievement was in 1990, when he teamed up with Zoltán Adorján to secure a first medal at world level for Hungary when they won a bronze at the 1990 Speedway World Pairs Championship in Germany.

In 2005, Tihanyi won his second Hungarian national championship.

Tihanyi has been retired from professional racing since 2012.

== World Final Appearances ==
=== Individual World Championship ===
- 1988 - (Denmark) Vojens, Speedway Center - 15th - 3pts
- 1990 - (England) Bradford, Odsal Stadium - Reserve - did not ride

=== World Pairs Championship ===
- 1990 - (West Germany) Landshut, Ellermühle Stadium (with Zoltán Adorján) - 3rd - 37pts

== See also ==
- Hungary national speedway team
