= Gábor Szegvári =

Hungarian speedway rider

- Nationality: Hungary

Career history
- 2000: ST Lendawa (SVN

Individual honours
- 1996: Junior Hungarian Champion

Gábor Szegvári is a former Hungarian motorcycle speedway rider who was a member of Hungary team at 2001 Speedway World Cup.

== Career details ==
- Team World Championship (Speedway World Team Cup and Speedway World Cup)
  - 2001 - 10th place
- Individual European Championship
  - 2001 - (Belgium) Heusden Zolder - 15th place (1 pt)
- European Club Champions' Cup
  - 2001 - 2nd place in Group A
- Individual Hungarian Championship
  - 1993 - 18th place (1 pt)
  - 1994 - 12th place (11 pts)
  - 1995 - 14th place (17 pts)
  - 1997 - 14th place (17 pts)
  - 1999 - 10th place (21 pts)
  - 2000 - 9th place (28 pts)
  - 2001 - 8th place (35 pts)
  - 2002 - 7th place (33 pts)
  - 2003 - 19th place (5 pts)
- Individual Junior Hungarian Championship
  - 1996 - Hungarian Champion

== See also ==
- Hungary national speedway team
