= Jan Dalhuisen =

Dutch legal scholar

- Born: Jan Hendrik Dalhuisen; 19 July 1943 (age 83); Dalfsen, the Netherlands
- Occupations: Legal scholar, jurist and author

Academic background
- Education: University of Amsterdam
- Thesis: Compositions in Bankruptcy: A Comparative Study of the Laws of the E.E.C. Countries, England and the U.S.A. (1968)

Academic work
- Discipline: International Commercial Law

Jan Hendrik Dalhuisen (born 19 July 1943) is a Dutch legal scholar, jurist and author with a career in international commercial and financial law.

== Education and academic career ==
Dalhuisen was born on 19 July 1943 in Dalfsen, the Netherlands.

Dalhuisen earned his undergraduate and doctoral degrees from the University of Amsterdam and also holds a degree from UC Berkeley. He is a corresponding member of the Royal Netherlands Academy of Arts and Sciences since 1985. Additionally, he has served as an ICSID arbitrator and a fellow of the Chartered Institute of Arbitrators in London.

He has held academic positions at several universities. His main positions:

- Professor of International Commercial Law at Utrecht University from 1990 to 1998
- Professor of Law at King's College London from 1996 to 2018
- Visiting Professor of Law at UC Berkeley from 1998 to 2023
- Visiting Professor of University of Tel Aviv in 2017
- Visiting Professor of National University of Singapore in 2016
- Chair of Transnational Finance at Catholic University of Portugal from 2008 to 2023

Dalhuisen is the author of Dalhuisen on International Insolvency and Bankruptcy and Dalhuisen on Transnational and Comparative Commercial, Financial and Trade Law.
