= Róbert Nagy (speedway rider) =

Hungarian motorcycle speedway rider

- Born: 28 April 1967 (age 59)
- Nationality: Hungarian

Career history

Great Britain
- 1992–1994: Glasgow
- 1995: Middlesbrough
- 1996: Hull
- 1996: Long Eaton

Denmark
- 2001: Outrup

Individual honours
- 1993, 1998 2000, 2001: Hungarian national champion
- 1992: British League Div. 2 Riders Champion

Róbert Nagy (born 28 April 1967) is a former motorcycle speedway rider from Hungary. He earned 13 caps for the Hungary national speedway team.

== Career ==
Nagy was a member of Hungary's national team. He is also a four times Hungarian national champion.

In Britain, Nagy rode for various clubs from 1992 to 1996.

During the 1992 British League Division Two season, Nagy won the British League Division Two Riders Championship, as a Glasgow rider. The final was held on 19 September at Brandon Stadium and Nagy defeated Mick Poole in the run off for the title after both riders finished on 13 points. His 1995 season came to an early end after he suffered serious injuries in race crash. He later rode for Middlesbrough Bears, Hull Vikings and Long Eaton Invaders.

== See also ==
- Hungary national speedway team
