= Csaba Hell =

Hungarian speedway rider

- Born: 20 May 1970 (age 56)
- Nationality: Hungarian

Career history

Hungary
- 1990: Volan Dozsa Nyiregyhaza
- 1991: Tisza Volan Sport Club
- 1994: Gyula

Great Britain
- 1991: Sheffield Tigers

Poland
- 1991–1992, 1994: Rzeszów
- 1996: Ostrów
- 1997: Kraków

Csaba Hell (born 20 May 1970) is a former Hungarian motorcycle speedway rider who was a member of Hungary's national team. He earned 4 caps for the Hungary national speedway team.

== Career ==
Hell rode in the British leagues for the Sheffield Tigers during the 1991 season. He had initially been signed by Glasgow Tigers, but the deal fell through over work permit issues.

== Career details ==
- Team World Championship (Speedway World Team Cup and Speedway World Cup)
  - 2002 – 10th place
  - 2003 – 11th place
- European Club Champions' Cup
  - 2001 – 2nd place in Group A

== See also ==
- Hungary national speedway team
