= Speedway Miskolc =

Hungarian motorcycle speedway team

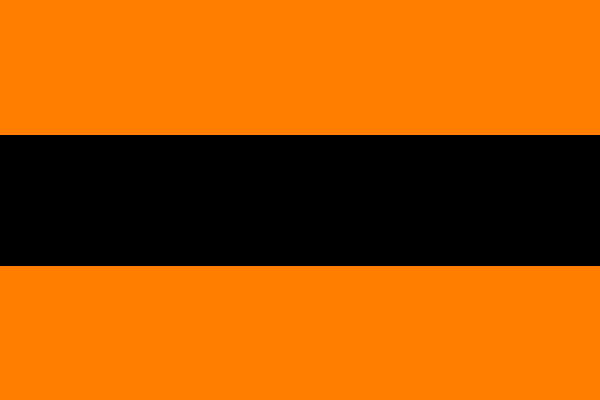

Club information
- Track address: Borsod Volán Stadion; Budai József u. 1, 3529 Miskolc
- Country: Hungary
- Founded: 1962
- Closed: 2013

Club facts
- Track size: 367 m

Major team honours
Hungarian Championship	1974, 1975, 1976, 1977, 1978, 1979, 1980, 1983
2. Liga	2009

Speedway Miskolc, were a Hungarian motorcycle speedway team based in Miskolc who races in the Hungarian Team Speedway Championship and the Polish Speedway Second League from 2006 to 2010. They raced at the Borsod Volán Stadion.

== History ==
The team were one of the most successful speedway teams in Hungary, winning the Hungarian Championship on eight occasions from 1974 to 1980 and 1983. In 2006, the team decided to participate in the Team Speedway Polish Championship, which at the time was the leading league in the world. They joined the 2. Liga and finished 7th in the league during their inaugural 2006 Polish speedway season. After fifth and second-place finishes over the following two seasons, they reached the 2009 place play off final, where they won their first Polish honours defeating Orzeł Łódź in the final.

The team were promoted to the 1. Liga for the 2010 Polish speedway season but struggled for good results and finished last in the division. In 2011, the team withdrew from the Polish leagues because they were not granted a licence to take part in the competition. They unsuccessfully appealed against the decision.

The team folded in 2013 due to financial issues.
