= Hungarian Team Speedway Championship =

Former annual motorcycle speedway national team championship

- Sport: Motorcycle speedway
- Founded: 1974
- Folded: 2012

The Hungarian Team Speedway Championships was the annual motorcycle speedway championship held each year organised by the HZM from 1974 to 2012.

== Past Winners ==
Year	Winners	Runner-up	3rd place
1974	Speedway Miskolc	Volán Debrecen	Papp József SE Miskolc
1975	Speedway Miskolc	Volán Debrecen	Volán Szeged
1976	Speedway Miskolc	Volán Debrecen	Volán Szeged
1977	Speedway Miskolc	Volán Debrecen	Volán Szeged
1978	Speedway Miskolc	Volán Debrecen	Volán Békési-Szeged
1979	Speedway Miskolc	Volán Debrecen	Volán Békési-Szeged
1980	Speedway Miskolc	Volán Debrecen	Volán Békési-Szeged
1981	Volán Debrecen	Volán Békési-Szeged	Speedway Miskolc
1982	Volán Debrecen	Speedway Miskolc	Volán Békési-Szeged
1983	Speedway Miskolc	?	?
1984	Volán Debrecen	Volán Nyíregyháza	Speedway Miskolc
1985	S.C. Volán Debrecen	Volán Békéscsabai	Volán Nyíregyháza
1986	S.C. Volán Debrecen	Speedway Miskolc	?
1987	Volán Dózsa Nyíregyháza	Speedway Miskolc	?
1988	Hajdú Volán S.C. Debrecen	?	?
1989	Hajdú Volán S.C. Debrecen	Volán Dózsa Nyíregyháza	Tisza Volán Szeged
1990	S.C. Tisza	Hajdú Volán S.C. Debrecen	Volán Dózsa Nyíregyháza
1991	Debrecen Speedway Club	Debrecen Volán Sport Club	Nyíregyházi Volán Sport Club
1992	S.C. Debrecen	Építők Borsodi Volán Miskolc	?
1993	Hajdú Volán S.C. Debrecen	?	Speedway Miskolc
1994	Volán Debrecen	Adorján Speedway Team	Gyula
2004	Simon & Wolf Debrecen	Speedway Miskolc	Brill-Car Debrecen
2005	Simon & Wolf Debrecen	Speedway Miskolc	Hajdú Volán S.C. Debrecen
2006	Simon & Wolf Debrecen	Hajdú Volán S.C. Debrecen	Speedway Miskolc
2007	Simon & Wolf Debrecen	Hajdú Volán S.C. Debrecen	Speedway Miskolc
2008	Simon & Wolf Debrecen	Gyulai S.C. Gyula	Duna House Luigi Team
2012	Debrecen Autohaz Tigrisek	Speedway Miskolc	MPA System Bikák Miskolc

== See also ==
- Hungary national speedway team
- Hungarian Individual Speedway Championship
