= Hungary national speedway team =

Hungarian national motorcycle speedway team

Hungary
- Nation colour: Red, White and Green
- SWC wins: 0

The Hungary national speedway team are one of the teams that compete in international team motorcycle speedway.

== History ==
The Hungarian speedway team first competed in the Speedway World Team Cup during the 1966 Speedway World Team Cup, finishing second in the Continental semi final round. Throughout the history of World Team Cup, the team were ever present from 1966 to 2000. However, they were one of the weaker nations and failed to reach a final for the first thirty years of the competition.

The team experienced a better record in the World Pairs Championship, reaching finals in 1972, 1988, 1989, 1990 and 1993. The team's greatest success came in the 1990 final, when they won a shock bronze medal.

It was not until 1996 that they appeared in their first World Team Cup final and then the following years in 1997 and 1998, repeated the achievement. Since 2001, Hungary have struggled and have in the majority of cases failed to qualify for the World Cup or the Speedway of Nations introduced in 2018. They have however won two medals at the European Pairs Speedway Championship, a bronze in 2006 and a silver in 2011.

== Major world finals ==
=== World Team Championships ===
Year	Venue	Standings (Pts)	Riders	Pts
1996	(Germany); Diedenbergen; Speedway Arena Diedenbergen	1. Poland (27); 2. Russia (22); 3. Denmark (21); 4. Germany (20); 5. Sweden (14); 6. (United Kingdom) Great Britain (12); 7. Hungary (9)	Sándor Tihanyi	3
1996	(Germany); Diedenbergen; Speedway Arena Diedenbergen	1. Poland (27); 2. Russia (22); 3. Denmark (21); 4. Germany (20); 5. Sweden (14); 6. (United Kingdom) Great Britain (12); 7. Hungary (9)	Zoltán Adorján	3
1996	(Germany); Diedenbergen; Speedway Arena Diedenbergen	1. Poland (27); 2. Russia (22); 3. Denmark (21); 4. Germany (20); 5. Sweden (14); 6. (United Kingdom) Great Britain (12); 7. Hungary (9)	Norbert Magosi	3
1997	(Poland); Pila; Stadion Żużlowy Centrum	1. Denmark (27); 2. Poland (25); 3. Sweden (21); 4. Germany (17); 5. Czech Republic (16); 6. Russia (10); 7. Hungary (9)	Sándor Tihanyi	6
1997	(Poland); Pila; Stadion Żużlowy Centrum	1. Denmark (27); 2. Poland (25); 3. Sweden (21); 4. Germany (17); 5. Czech Republic (16); 6. Russia (10); 7. Hungary (9)	Zoltán Adorján	3
1997	(Poland); Pila; Stadion Żużlowy Centrum	1. Denmark (27); 2. Poland (25); 3. Sweden (21); 4. Germany (17); 5. Czech Republic (16); 6. Russia (10); 7. Hungary (9)	Laszlo Bodi	0
1998	(Denmark); Vojens; Vojens Speedway Center	1. United States (28); 2. Sweden (24); 3. Denmark (23); 4. Poland (17); 5. Germany (14); 6. Czech Republic (14); 7. Hungary (6)	Zoltán Adorján	5
1998	(Denmark); Vojens; Vojens Speedway Center	1. United States (28); 2. Sweden (24); 3. Denmark (23); 4. Poland (17); 5. Germany (14); 6. Czech Republic (14); 7. Hungary (6)	Sándor Tihanyi	1

=== World Pairs Championships ===
Year	Venue	Standings (Pts)	Riders	Pts
1972	(Sweden); Borås; Ryavallen	1. England (24); 2. New Zealand (24); 3. Sweden B (22); 4. Sweden A (22); 5. Poland (15); 6. Czechoslovakia (12); 7. Hungary (6)	Ferenc Radacsi	6
1972	(Sweden); Borås; Ryavallen	1. England (24); 2. New Zealand (24); 3. Sweden B (22); 4. Sweden A (22); 5. Poland (15); 6. Czechoslovakia (12); 7. Hungary (6)	Pal Perenyi	0
1988	(England); Bradford; Odsal Stadium	1. Denmark (45); 2. England (41); 3. United States (39); 4. New Zealand (32); 5. Sweden (26); 6. Hungary (25); 7. Italy (21); 8. West Germany (21); 9. Poland (17)	Antal Kocso	15
1988	(England); Bradford; Odsal Stadium	1. Denmark (45); 2. England (41); 3. United States (39); 4. New Zealand (32); 5. Sweden (26); 6. Hungary (25); 7. Italy (21); 8. West Germany (21); 9. Poland (17)	Zoltán Adorján	10
1989	(Poland); Leszno; Alfred Smoczyk Stadium	1. Denmark (48); 2. Sweden (44); 3. England (37); 4. West Germany (36); 5. Finland (31); 6. Hungary (22); 7. Czechoslovakia (25); 8. Italy (15); 9. Poland (11)	Antal Kocso	14
1989	(Poland); Leszno; Alfred Smoczyk Stadium	1. Denmark (48); 2. Sweden (44); 3. England (37); 4. West Germany (36); 5. Finland (31); 6. Hungary (22); 7. Czechoslovakia (25); 8. Italy (15); 9. Poland (11)	Zoltán Adorján	8
1990	(West Germany); Landshut; Ellermühle Stadium	1. Denmark (43); 2. Australia (41); 3. Hungary (33); 4. Sweden (33); 5. New Zealand (32); 6. United States (28); 7. Czechoslovakia (21); 8. England (20); 9. West Germany (15)	Zoltán Adorján	21
1990	(West Germany); Landshut; Ellermühle Stadium	1. Denmark (43); 2. Australia (41); 3. Hungary (33); 4. Sweden (33); 5. New Zealand (32); 6. United States (28); 7. Czechoslovakia (21); 8. England (20); 9. West Germany (15)	Sándor Tihanyi	12
1993	(Denmark); Vojens; Vojens Speedway Center	1. Sweden (26); 2. United States (28); 3. Denmark (21); 4. (United Kingdom) Great Britain (17); 5. Poland (15); 6. Australia (13); 7. Hungary (10)	Zoltán Adorján	6
1993	(Denmark); Vojens; Vojens Speedway Center	1. Sweden (26); 2. United States (28); 3. Denmark (21); 4. (United Kingdom) Great Britain (17); 5. Poland (15); 6. Australia (13); 7. Hungary (10)	Antal Kocso	3
1993	(Denmark); Vojens; Vojens Speedway Center	1. Sweden (26); 2. United States (28); 3. Denmark (21); 4. (United Kingdom) Great Britain (17); 5. Poland (15); 6. Australia (13); 7. Hungary (10)	József Petrikovics	1

== International caps (as of 2022) ==
Since the advent of the Speedway Grand Prix era, international caps earned by riders is largely restricted to international competitions, whereas previously test matches between two teams were a regular occurrence. This means that the number of caps earned by a rider has decreased in the modern era.

Rider	Caps
Adorján, Zoltán	51
Bodi, Laszlo	
Ferjan, Matej	2
Hell, Csaba	4
Kocso, Antal	18
Magosi, Norbert	12
Nagy, Róbert	13
Perenyi, Pal	
Petrikovics, József	
Radacsi, Ferenc	
Stefáni, Atilla	8
Szatmári, László	
Szegvári, Gábor	
Tabaka, József	5
Tihanyi, Sándor	
Vida, Szabolcs	

== See also ==
- Hungarian Individual Speedway Championship
- Hungarian Team Speedway Championship
