= 1981 UK & Ireland Greyhound Racing Year =

The 1981 UK & Ireland Greyhound Racing Year was the 56th year of greyhound racing in the United Kingdom and the 55th year of greyhound racing in Ireland.

== Roll of honour ==
Major Winners
Award	Name of Winner
1981 English Greyhound Derby	Parkdown Jet
1981 Irish Greyhound Derby	Bold Work
1981 Scottish Greyhound Derby	Marbella Sky
Greyhound Trainer of the Year	Joe Cobbold
Greyhound of the Year	Decoy Boom
Irish Greyhound of the Year	Parkdown Jet
Trainers Championship	Joe Cobbold

== Summary ==
The National Greyhound Racing Club (NGRC) released the annual returns, with totalisator turnover down 10%, at £72,950,373 and attendances down 10%, recorded at 4,943,396 from 5291 meetings. Attendances had decreased significantly for the second year running, although party due to 200 less meetings it was a worrying time for the industry. Track tote retention remained 17% and government tote tax 4%.

Decoy Boom, a fawn bitch was voted Greyhound of the Year. She won the BBC TV Trophy, GRA Stakes, Scottish Marathon, Stow Marathon and Longcross Cup.

== Tracks ==
Chesterton Greyhound Stadium and Maidstone joined the NGRC permit scheme. Two independents opened Brownhills and Skegness.

== News ==
Tim Hale and Derek Bowman replaced Racing Manager Harry Bridger at Leeds; the track owners Ladbrokes later announced the site would be used for industrial development in the near future.

Towards the end of the year the country suffered terrible weather and the majority of the horse racing fixtures were cancelled. This meant that extra afternoon race meetings were organised to help the betting shops. Extra fixtures were organised by Hackney, Bristol, Monmore, Cambridge, Romford and Crayford. This provided an opportunity for tracks to negotiate a better deal for the future to combat the drop in attendances blamed on the betting shops, however they failed to do so preferring to take short term cash benefits instead.

The Greyhound Racing Association (GRA) announced that they had repaid two thirds of their debt. The business was doing well from its greyhound racing income which begged the question as to how the company allowed themselves to get into such debt in the first place.

Leading trainer Pat Mullins died in March after collapsing whilst working at his kennels in Manningtree. He had suffered a heart attack the previous year and had been warned by doctors to avoid stress. His wife Linda Mullins would take over the kennels. The leading independent trainer Charlie Lister took out an NGRC licence and would soon gain some success, his first breakthrough was with Swift Band, who won the 1981 East Anglian Derby.

== Competitions ==
Marbella Sky won the Scottish Greyhound Derby at Shawfield Stadium, and later finished runner up in the Edinburgh Cup at Powderhall Stadium. The greyhound (still a puppy) faced an exciting future but was then stolen from the Wakefield kennels of his trainer Ray Andrews. He was never recovered.

A new major event was inaugurated at Wembley called the Blue Riband and would replace the long running Wembley Spring Cup which had been one of the first major competitions in the greyhound racing calendar. The Grand National at White City went to Bobcol trained by Norah McEllistrim; the black dog had already won the Springbok crown the previous year. The hurdler went on to score a hat-trick when travelling to Powderhall and winning the Scottish Grand National.

Lauries Panther, a black and white dog, whelped in April, 1980 by Shamrock Sailor out of Lady Lucy, was owned by Laurie James and trained at Romford by Terry Duggan and appeared on the racing scene in the Bobby Jack Puppy Cup run at Wimbledon Stadium in November, followed by the Christmas Puppy Cup at Romford. He performed well and would be aimed at the Pall Mall Stakes the following year.

Oran Jack twice broke the Irish national 550 yards record on his way to winning the Irish St Leger at Limerick. The fawn dog trained by husband and wife team Michael and Rose Grealish recorded 30.20 and 30.16 in the second round and semi finals respectively, before winning the final.

== Principal UK races ==
BBC TV Trophy, Perry Barr (Mar 18, 830m, £2,000)
Pos	Name of Greyhound	Trainer	SP	Time	Trap
1st	Decoy Boom	Joe Cobbold	54.27	7-4f	5
2nd	Laugh Lines		54.31	16-1	3
3rd	Pineapple Choice	Paul Smith	54.67	4-1	4
4th	Salina	George Lang	54.87	3-1	2
5th	Westmead Light	Natalie Savva	54.88	7-2	1
6th	Corboy Champion	George Curtis	55.16	20-1	6

Grand National, White City (April 4 500m h, £4,000)
Pos	Name of Greyhound	Trainer	SP	Time	Trap
1st	Bobcol	Norah McEllistrim	1-2f	30.64	1
2nd	Westmead Prince	Natalie Savva	10-1	30.84	3
3rd	Dine Out	Paddy McEvoy	11-4	30.88	2
4th	Breakaway Slave		50-1	31.18	6
5th	Weston Whisky		10-1	31.30	5
6th	Westlands Steve	Gunner Smith	10-1	31.44	3

Laurels, Wimbledon (May 22, 460m, £5,000)
Pos	Name of Greyhound	Trainer	SP	Time	Trap
1st	Echo Spark	Joe Cobbold	5-1	27.84	6
2nd	Upland Tiger	George Curtis	4-9f	27.85	1
3rd	Over the River	Tom Reilly	10-1	27.97	2
4th	Johnnys Brandy		66-1	28.31	4
5th	Lancia Q	Paddy McEvoy	8-1	28.45	3
6th	Radio Skinomage	Jack Coker	25-1	28.51	5

Scurry Gold Cup, Slough (Jul 18, 442m, £5,000)
Pos	Name of Greyhound	Trainer	SP	Time	Trap
1st	Longcross Smokey	Phil Rees Jr.	5-1	27.17	6
2nd	Emerald Freedom	Charlie Coyle	9-2	27.21	1
3rd	Bright Tiger	Les Stiles	10-1	27.29	2
4th	Lancia Q	Paddy McEvoy	1-1f	27.31	5
5th	Sawyers King	Arthur Hitch	10-1	27.55	4
6th	Express Work	Hazel Walden	33-1	27.79	3

Harp Lager Scottish Derby, Shawfield (Aug 8, 500m, £3,000)
Pos	Name of Greyhound	Trainer	SP	Time	Trap
1st	Marbella Sky	Ray Andrews	12-1	30.66	3
2nd	Dysart Ends	Stewart Loan	20-1	30.88	2
3rd	Zippi Boy	Bill Gray	7-2	30.92	4
4th	Heres Gay	Gordon Hodson	5-2	30.98	1
5th	Solos Style		10-1	31.14	5
6th	Decoy Ranger	Joe Cobbold	11-10f	31.18	6

St Leger, Wembley (Aug 28, 655m, £6,000)
Pos	Name of Greyhound	Trainer	SP	Time	Trap
1st	Fox Watch	Mrs Jill Holt	5-2jf	40.17	4
2nd	Alfa My Son	Leon Steed	5-2jf	40.27	6
3rd	Ballybeg Bob	David Oswald	8-1	40.31	2
4th	Johnny Bristol	Peter Payne	7-1	40.37	3
5th	Safe Landing	Tom Foster	12-1	40.40	1
6th	Longcross Smokey	Phil Rees Jr.	7-2	40.42	5

Gold Collar, Catford (Sep 19, 555m, £5,000)
Pos	Name of Greyhound	Trainer	SP	Time	Trap
1st	Laughing Sam	Mrs Pat Goode	4-1	35.50	6
2nd	Geekay Patch	G Kenny-Derby	13-8f	35.51	3
3rd	Crack On		50-1	35.77	2
4th	Sport Promoter	Linda Mullins	4-1	35.80	5
5th	Ballybeg Bob	David Oswald	3-1	35.83	4
6th	Rathduff Solara	Tony Dennis	5-1	35.87	1

Cesarewitch, Belle Vue (Oct 3, 815m, £4,000)
Pos	Name of Greyhound	Trainer	SP	Time	Trap
1st	Kinda Friendly	Ernie Gaskin Sr.	7-4f	52.68	6
2nd	McElm Pride	Miss S Phillips	5-2	53.20	3
3rd	Nails United	Smith	12-1	53.44	5
4th	Rolstone Rose	Mary Baber	7-2	53.68	1
5th	Newlands Honour		33-1	53.72	4
6th	Rambling Bridie	Tony Jowett	5-1	53.73	2

The Grand Prix, Walthamstow (Oct 17, 640m, £5,500)
Pos	Name of Greyhound	Trainer	SP	Time	Trap
1st	Rathduff Solara	Tony Dennis	2-1jf	40.71	6
2nd	Relkcom	Johnny Faint	2-1jf	40.81	5
3rd	Emerald Freedom	Charlie Coyle	5-1	40.82	1
4th	Ballybeg Bob	David Oswald	9-2	41.22	2
5th	Korchnoi	Bill Horton	6-1	41.24	3
6th	Burgess Gift		40-1	41.46	4

Oaks, Harringay (Oct 30, 475m, £3,000)
Pos	Name of Greyhound	Trainer	SP	Time	Trap
1st	Thanet Princess	Dick Hawkes	11-2	28.82	3
2nd	Toker Gannet	T Nicholls	7-2	28.90	4
3rd	Sundridge Bet-U	Tony Dennis	4-1	29.02	5
4th	Decoy Villa	Joe Cobbold	15-8f	29.08	1
5th	Oakfield Tracey	Rita Hayward	16-1	29.48	6
6th	Sailor May	Eric Pateman	4-1	30.02	2

=== Principal Irish finals ===
Easter Cup Shelbourne (525y)
Pos	Name of Greyhound	Time	Trap	Trainer
1st	Murrays Mixture	29.15		Francie Murray
2nd				
3rd				
4th				
5th				
6th				

Purina National Produce Clonmel (525y £6,250)
Pos	Name of Greyhound	Time	Trap	Trainer
1st	Calandra Champ	29.66		Francie Murray
2nd	Pure Hardship	29.68		
3rd				
4th				
5th				
6th				

Shelbourne 600 Shelbourne (600y)
Pos	Name of Greyhound	Time	Trap	Trainer
1st	Macintosh Mentor	33.78		Mullen
2nd				
3rd				
4th				
5th				
6th				

Smithwicks St Leger Limerick (10 October, 550y, £7,500)
Pos	Name of Greyhound	Time	Trap	Trainer
1st	Oran Jack	30.62	2	Rose Grealish
2nd	Sharps Express	30.83	5	Matt O'Donnell
3rd	Murlens Blond	31.04	1	Paddy Keane
4th	Caoilte	31.18	3	Simpson
u	Carless Sonny		4	John Hayes
u	Killimy Ivy		6	Matt O'Donnell

Lyon Industrial Estates Oaks Shelbourne (525y £11,300)
Pos	Name of Greyhound	Time	Trap	Trainer
1st	Claremount May	29.52		Niall Maher
2nd	Thornbrae Lass	29.62		
3rd	Our Tallyho	29.67		
u	Joebe			
u	Kasco Lady			
u	Blue Rum			Michael Byrne

Champion Stakes Shelbourne (550y)
Pos	Name of Greyhound	Time	Trap	Trainer
1st	I'm Lovely	32.02		John Hayes
2nd				
3rd				
4th				
5th				
6th				

Cashman Laurels Cork (29 Aug, 525y £7,500)
Pos	Name of Greyhound	Time	Trap	Trainer
1st	Knockeen Master	29.50	3	Christy O'Callaghan
2nd	Millbowe Sam	29.60	2	Murray
3rd	Free To All		4	Boyle
u	Kilmagoura Mist		1	Hickey
u	Ahaveen Katie		5	Curtin
u	Ocean Jerome		6	Hayes

Burmah Puppy Derby Harolds Cross (Sep, 525y)
Pos	Name of Greyhound	Time	Trap	Trainer
1st	Greenwood Robic	29.82		Tom Lynch
2nd	Stradey Park	30.10		Cecil Todd
3rd	Bright Pin			
4th	Oyster Cracker			
u	Cooladine Super			
u	Ballywilliam Star			

== Totalisator returns ==
Extended content

The totalisator returns declared to the National Greyhound Racing Club for the year 1981 are listed below.

Stadium	Turnover £
London (Walthamstow)	8,053,327
London (White City)	7,880,545
London (Wimbledon)	5,779,087
London (Harringay)	4,070,119
Romford	3,603,654
Brighton & Hove	3,602,521
London (Catford)	3,362,440
London (Wembley)	3,108,983
Slough	3,047,136
Manchester (Belle Vue)	2,425,326
Birmingham (Hall Green)	2,253,573
Crayford & Bexleyheath	2,036,679
Edinburgh (Powderhall)	1,972,105
Newcastle (Brough Park)	1,444,716
Birmingham (Perry Barr, old)	1,407,054
Sheffield (Owlerton)	1,405,848

Stadium	Turnover £
Southend-on-Sea	1,398,628
Glasgow (Shawfield)	1,393,818
Leeds	1,126,619
Wolverhampton (Monmore)	1,109,007
London (Hackney)	941,982
Yarmouth	844,127
Ramsgate	840,013
Gloucester & Cheltenham	824,159
Portsmouth	805,085
Derby	751,876
Bristol	696,632
Oxford	518,221
Milton Keynes	507,891
Newcastle (Gosforth)	507,474
Nottingham	490,251
Ipswich	463,919

Stadium	Turnover £
Poole	450,595
Reading	423,842
Middlesbrough	404,421
Hull (Old Craven Park)	383,348
Cradley Heath	375,280
Henlow (Bedfordshire)	332,928
Leicester	309,996
Cambridge	307,163
Rye House	300,976
Coventry	274,602
Swindon	260,091
Manchester (White City)	225,933
Maidstone	110,142
Chesterton	94,243
Norton Canes	20,000
