= 1982 UK & Ireland Greyhound Racing Year =

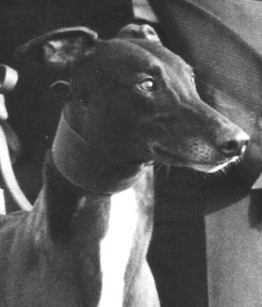
- Huberts Shade, dual classic winner

The 1982 UK & Ireland Greyhound Racing Year was the 57th year of greyhound racing in the United Kingdom and the 56th year of greyhound racing in Ireland.

== Roll of honour ==
Major Winners
Award	Name of Winner
1982 English Greyhound Derby	Lauries Panther
1982 Irish Greyhound Derby	Cooladine Super
1982 Scottish Greyhound Derby	Special Account
Greyhound Trainer of the Year	Adam Jackson
Greyhound of the Year	Lauries Panther
Irish Greyhound of the Year	Supreme Tiger
Trainers Championship	Adam Jackson

== Summary ==
The National Greyhound Racing Club (NGRC) released the annual returns, with totalisator turnover down 15%, at £63,233,040 and attendances down 10%, recorded at 4,311,554 from 5432 meetings. Attendances had decreased significantly for the third successive year to a new record low. Track tote retention increased slightly from 17% to 17.5%. One attempt to increase attendances was a 15% increase in advertised open races.

Lauries Panther, a black and white dog was voted Greyhound of the Year. He won the 1982 English Greyhound Derby at White City and the Laurels at Wimbledon Stadium.

== Tracks ==
White City Stadium in Manchester closed, the track had been sold to developers by the Greyhound Racing Association (GRA) the previous year. The Cock o' the North and Manchester Cup both switched to Belle Vue Stadium. Ladbrokes closed Leeds on 15 March, they had also sold to developers the previous year, trainer Peter Beaumont joined Belle Vue.

== News ==
Bob Rowe relinquished his position as White City Racing Manager to take up the role of Chief Racing Manager of the GRA, the previous year Hugh Richardson had vacated that job after retiring. John Collins was brought in to replace Bob Rowe at White City. Jim Woods formerly Charlie Boulton's assistant at Harringay Stadium took up the position of Racing Manager at Perry Barr.

Trainers Joe Pickering and Colin West retired leaving White City two trainers short, they appointed Graham Mann (son of Sid Mann) and Frank Melville from Harringay as replacements. Powderhall Stadium replaced Mann with their first ever female trainer Jane Glass.

Five rival totalisator companies featured at the W.G.R.F exhibition, they were - Data Tote systems, United totalisator company, Stadia systems, Control systems Ltd (Bell Punch) and Amtote from the United States. World of Sport transmitted live races at the Ladbrokes Golden Jacket meeting at Harringay.

== Competitions ==
Irish Grand National champion Face The Mutt, now with Norah McEllistrim won the Grand National to complete a double.

Lauries Panther won the Laurels before being retired to stud. A brindle dog called Yankee Express won the Scurry Gold Cup at Slough Stadium for trainer George Curtis and Special Account won the Scottish Greyhound Derby for the Savvas, breaking the track record twice in the process during the semis and final. Huberts Shade trained by Adam Jackson at Wembley sealed a classic double by winning the St Leger at his home track and the Grand Prix at Walthamstow Stadium.

Mount Vernon Sports Stadium near Glasgow offered a first prize of £6,000 for the Ashfield Derby, the same prize as the official Scottish Derby.

== Ireland ==
After winning the Alpha Abrasive Puppy Stakes in Ireland a white and black greyhound called Game Ball was sold to English owners Brian Smith and Jerry Fisher for the large sum of £8,000.

== Principal UK races ==
BBC TV Trophy, Belle Vue (Mar 3, 815m, £2,500)
Pos	Name of Greyhound	Trainer	SP	Time	Trap
1st	Alfa My Son	Leon Steed	52.41	9-2	5
2nd	Trytravelscene	Arnold Mobley	52.71	7-2	6
3rd	Bridgetown Milly		52.79	50-1	4
4th	Spinney Lass		52.89	1-1f	3
5th	Sergeant Yorke		53.05	11-2	2
6th	Roystons Annie	Adam Jackson	53.15	7-1	1

Grand National, White City (April 3 500m h, £4,000)
Pos	Name of Greyhound	Trainer	SP	Time	Trap
1st	Face The Mutt	Norah McEllistrim	11-10f	30.71	6
2nd	Westmead Prince	Theo Mentzis	6-1	30.85	3
3rd	Cons Verity	Frank Melville	25-1	30.89	4
4th	Westlands Bridge	Gunner Smith	9-4	30.93	5
5th	Macintosh Matty	Colin West	6-1	31.21	1
6th	Sutton Light		33-1	32.09	2

Laurels, Wimbledon (May 21, 460m, £5,000)
Pos	Name of Greyhound	Trainer	SP	Time	Trap
1st	Lauries Panther	Terry Duggan	9-2	27.79	4
2nd	Decoy Ranch	Joe Cobbold	9-4f	27.85	1
3rd	Gan on George	Eric Pateman	3-1	28.13	6
4th	Real Good	Nora Gleeson	4-1	28.21	2
5th	Plough Gold		25-1	28.24	5
6th	Night Miller		5-1	28.56	3

Scurry Gold Cup, Slough (Jul 17, 442m, £5,000)
Pos	Name of Greyhound	Trainer	SP	Time	Trap
1st	Yankee Express	George Curtis	5-2	27.19	5
2nd	Lannon Lass	Tony Mann	4-6f	27.21	2
3rd	Decoy Ranch	Joe Cobbold	7-1	27.23	1
4th	Debras Shamrock		20-1	27.47	3
5th	Longcross Smokey	Phil Rees Jr.	25-1	27.67	6
6th	Greenfield Chat	Phil Rees Jr.	25-1	27.95	4

Scottish Greyhound Derby, Shawfield (Aug 14, 500m, £6,000)
Pos	Name of Greyhound	Trainer	SP	Time	Trap
1st	Special Account	Natalie Savva	1-1f	29.99+	5
2nd	Duke of Hazard	John Coleman	6-1	30.37	3
3rd	Go Winston	Ralph Smith	10-1	30.47	2
4th	Decoy Snowy		12-1	30.55	1
5th	Cooladine Jet	Edna Armstrong	10-1	30.71	6
6th	Long Spell	Joe Booth	2-1	30.75	4

+Track Record

St Leger, Wembley (Sep 8, 655m, £7,500)
Pos	Name of Greyhound	Trainer	SP	Time	Trap
1st	Huberts Shade	Adam Jackson	13-2	39.83	5
2nd	Donnas Dixie	Henry Kibble	7-4f	39.93	6
3rd	Westmead Ruby	Natalie Savva	2-1	39.99	1
4th	Decoy Sport	Joe Cobbold	6-1	40.05	2
5th	Liga Lad	Dave Vass	12-1	40.07	4
6th	Gibilisco	Mark Sullivan	14-1	40.13	3

Gold Collar, Catford (Sep 25, 555m, £5,000)
Pos	Name of Greyhound	Trainer	SP	Time	Trap
1st	Donnas Dixie	Henry Kibble	13-8	35.19	6
2nd	Mister Somebody	Peter Payne	5-4f	35.27	2
3rd	Flying Duke	Adam Jackson	5-1	35.30	3
4th	Metalina	Jim Sherry	6-1	35.34	1
5th	Coomlogane Style	John Horsfall	25-1	35.60	5
6th	Moss Fighter	Adam Jackson	16-1	35.62	4

Cesarewitch, Belle Vue (Oct 2, 815m, £3,000)
Pos	Name of Greyhound	Trainer	SP	Time	Trap
1st	Liga Lad	Dave Vass	6-4jf	51.83	3
2nd	Decoy Lassie	Joe Cobbold	7-1	51.97	4
3rd	Westmead Ruby	Natalie Savva	7-2	52.17	2
4th	Decoy Sport	Joe Cobbold	25-1	52.33	1
5th	Swift Duchess	Arthur Hitch	6-4jf	52.39	6
N/R	Monalee Treasure	Disq in SF			5

The Grand Prix, Walthamstow (Oct 16, 640m, £5,000)
Pos	Name of Greyhound	Trainer	SP	Time	Trap
1st	Huberts Shade	Adam Jackson	11-8f	39.73	6
2nd	Glenbrien Ranger		10-1	40.09	5
3rd	Kylnoe Bob	Bill Foley	15-8	40.17	2
4th	Gibilisco	Mark Sullivan	16-1	40.25	1
5th	Apapa Song	Linda Mullins	4-1	40.47	3
6th	Metalina	Jim Sherry	12-1	40.59	4

Oaks, Harringay (Oct 29, 475m, £3,000)
Pos	Name of Greyhound	Trainer	SP	Time	Trap
1st	Duchess of Avon	Adam Jackson	1-1f	28.72	4
2nd	Synone Polly	Vicky Holloway	3-1	28.74	6
3rd	Lovely Lil		12-1	28.90	5
4th	Giselle	Richard Steele	8-1	29.10	2
5th	Paris Dream	Ernie Wiley	9-2	29.14	1
N/R	Westlands Jane	Gunner Smith			

== Totalisator returns ==
Extended content

The totalisator returns declared to the National Greyhound Racing Club for the year 1982 are listed below.

Stadium	Turnover £
London (Walthamstow)	7,233,226
London (White City)	6,946,295
London (Wimbledon)	4,920,031
London (Harringay)	3,567,491
Romford	3,566,114
Brighton & Hove	3,209,548
London (Catford)	2,815,159
London (Wembley)	2,747,294
Slough	2,569,830
Manchester (Belle Vue)	2,265,974
Birmingham (Hall Green)	1,960,060
Edinburgh (Powderhall)	1,713,552
Crayford & Bexleyheath	1,621,107
Sheffield (Owlerton)	1,318,801
Southend-on-Sea	1,304,955
Newcastle (Brough Park)	1,083,751

Stadium	Turnover £
Glasgow (Shawfield)	1,013,486
Wolverhampton (Monmore)	944,914
Yarmouth	859,787
Birmingham (Perry Barr, old)	846,798
Gloucester & Cheltenham	780,546
London (Hackney)	769,114
Ramsgate	761,711
Portsmouth	704,587
Derby	648,275
Maidstone	539,265
Oxford	461,117
Milton Keynes	439,446
Ipswich	429,616
Reading	408,802
Newcastle (Gosforth)	406,029
Bristol	385,374

Stadium	Turnover £
Poole	363,552
Nottingham	361,183
Hull (Old Craven Park)	360,962
Middlesbrough	332,503
Cambridge	320,597
Henlow (Bedfordshire)	317,386
Cradley Heath	315,132
Rye House	310,038
Leicester	264,820
Coventry	245,440
Swindon	218,087
Leeds	210,503
Norton Canes	200,000
Chesterton	72,161
