= 1979 UK & Ireland Greyhound Racing Year =

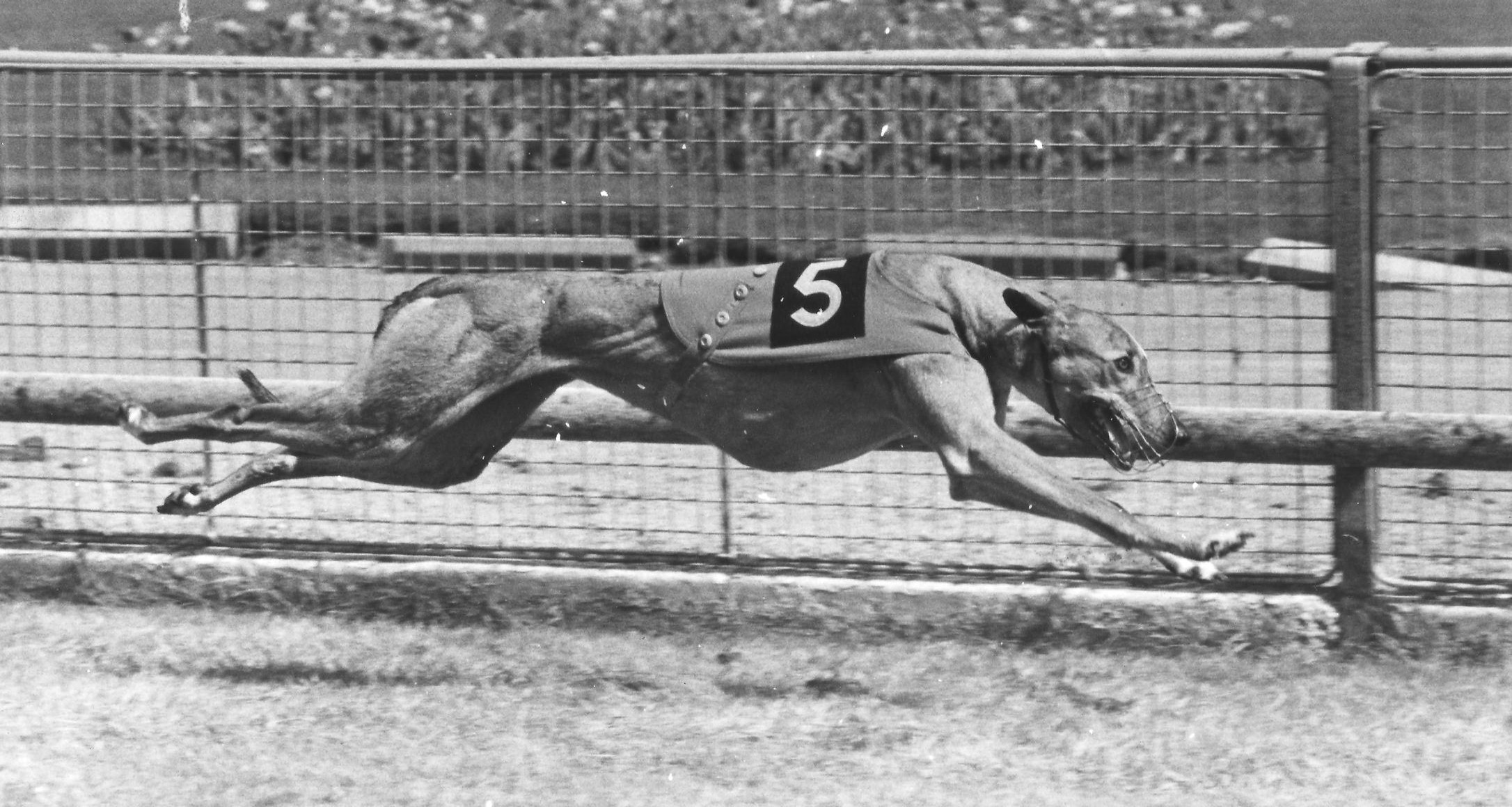
- Sarahs Bunny, 1979 English Derby winner

The 1979 UK & Ireland Greyhound Racing Year was the 54th year of greyhound racing in the United Kingdom and the 53rd year of greyhound racing in Ireland.

== Roll of honour ==
Major Winners
Award	Name of Winner
1979 English Greyhound Derby	Sarahs Bunny
1979 Irish Greyhound Derby	Penny County
1979 Scottish Greyhound Derby	Greenville Boy
Greyhound Trainer of the Year	Geoff De Mulder
Greyhound of the Year	Desert Pilot & Kilmagoura Mist
Irish Greyhound of the Year	Nameless Pixie
Trainers Championship	John Honeysett

Trainers Championship, Crayford & Bexleyheath Stadium (24 March)
Pos	Name of Trainer	Points
1st	John Honeysett	42
2nd	John Coleman	40
3rd	Ted Dickson	36
4th	Pat Mullins	34
5th	Geoff De Mulder	32
6th	Natalie Savva	24

== Summary ==
The National Greyhound Racing Club (NGRC) released the annual returns, with totalisator turnover down, at £70,685,971 and attendances up, recorded at 6,585,491 from 5712 meetings. White City remains the top earner with an average meeting tote turnover of £55,677, some £5,000 more than closest rival Walthamstow Stadium.

Desert Pilot, a white and brindle dog and Kilmagoura Mist, a brindle bitch, were voted joint Greyhound of the Year. Desert Pilot won the Select Stakes and Wembley Summer Cup, Kilmagoura Mist won the St Leger. Sarahs Bunny, a kennelmate of Desert Pilot won the 1979 English Greyhound Derby.

== Tracks ==
Three tracks closed, Rochester (4 October), Halifax and the Horton Road Stadium in Gloucester (6 July).

== News ==
The BGRF (British Greyhound Racing Federation) went into voluntary liquidation, the organisation body that had only been formed in 1977 between the NGRC and track promoters had been a disaster. Bizarrely despite the financial losses of the body a new replacement called the British Greyhound Racing Board was set up within months, with the aim to promote and elevate the greyhound racing industry, to improve the welfare and rules of racing.

Leeds closed their track kennels and lost three top trainers in the process, Joe Kelly, Tommy Brown and Jim Brennan (better known for his spell at Sheffield). Kelly was recruited by Racing Manager Terry Meynell and moved into the kennels of the late Harry Bamford, who had died aged just 40 while Brown and Brennan retired. Contracted trainers replacing them at Leeds were Pete Beaumont, Jim Brown and Ray Andrews. New Southend trainer Tom Lanceman also supplied runners for Ipswich, he was one of the first ever trainers to take up a dual attachment. Lanceman also trained the Grand National winner Topofthetide to a second successive win, the greyhound had won in 1978 for Tim Forster at odds on.

Lacca Champion was retired after the Derby and Joe De Mulder, former trainer and father of Geoff De Mulder died.

== Competitions ==
A newcomer called Sports Promoter reared by Pat and Linda Mullins broke the track record over 400 metres at Cambridge in his first race and went on to win the Romford Puppy Cup and Sporting Life Juvenile. The Olympic returned after an eight-year absence, the event was resurrected by Brighton.

John Honeysett won a closely fought Trainers Championship at Crayford with 41 points, defeating John Coleman by just two points. Both had three winners on the night, Honeysett (Sandpiper Folly, Langford Dan, Triple Aspect), Coleman (Noble Brigg, Head Prefect, Our Rufus).

== Ireland ==
The Bord na gCon announced a massive 60% hike in prize money. The grand re-opening of Galway was on 25 May, with the modernisation costing over £500,000.

== Principal UK races ==
Grand National, White City (April 7 500m h, £2,000)
Pos	Name of Greyhound	Trainer	SP	Time	Trap
1st	Topothetide	Tom Lanceman	6-4f	31.60	1
2nd	Killallen Jack	Phil Rees Jr.	16-1	32.24	3
3rd	Tax Band	Joe Pickering	9-4	32.25	5
4th	Cherryhill King		10-1	32.65	2
5th	Oscar B	Norah McEllistrim	5-1	32.69	6
6th	Elton Smasher	Richard Griffin	8-1	32.87	4

BBC TV Trophy, Hall Green (Apr 11, 815m, £1,750)
Pos	Name of Greyhound	Trainer	SP	Time	Trap
1st	Westown Blaze	Reg Young	53.16	5-1	6
2nd	Aglish Boss	Joe Cobbold	53.40	20-1	2
3rd	Welsh Cobbler	John Honeysett	53.44	11-4	4
4th	Westown Adam	Natalie Savva	53.58	15-8f	3
5th	Olvera		53.74	5-1	1
6th	Ellas Melody	Bertie Gaynor	53.75	6-1	5

Laurels, Wimbledon (May 18, 460m, £3,000)
Pos	Name of Greyhound	Trainer	SP	Time	Trap
1st	Another Spatter	Joe Pickering	7-2	27.75	3
2nd	Pigeon Flyer	Tom Reilly	7-1	27.93	1
3rd	Across the Miles	R Young	10-1	28.09	6
4th	Sampsons Pal	Pat Mullins	9-4f	28.33	2
5th	Young Toby	Eric Pateman	4-1	28.41	4
6th	Its Stylish		4-1	28.42	5

Scurry Gold Cup, Slough (Jul 21, 442m, £3,000)
Pos	Name of Greyhound	Trainer	SP	Time	Trap
1st	Northway Point	George Morrow	20-1	27.20	6
2nd	The Grand Devil	Phil Rees Jr.	9-4	27.46	1
3rd	Knockrour Brandy	Freda Greenacre	7-2	27.49	4
4th	Teddy Boy		33-1	27.61	5
5th	Johns Luck	John Coleman	4-1	27.69	2
6th	Saucy Buck	Ted Dickson	1-1f	27.77	3

Scottish Greyhound Derby, Shawfield (Aug 11, 500m, £3,000)
Pos	Name of Greyhound	Trainer	SP	Time	Trap
1st	Greenville Boy	Pat Mullins	6-4f	30.49	1
2nd	Dually Lad	G Barnett	3-1	30.59	3
3rd	Blissful Hero	Bertie Gaynor	4-1	30.65	5
4th	Black Haven		7-1	30.85	2
5th	Backdeed Man		4-1	30.93	6
6th	Miss Olivia	Graham Mann	8-1	31.05	4

St Leger, Wembley (Sep 3, 655m, £10,000)
Pos	Name of Greyhound	Trainer	SP	Time	Trap
1st	Kilmagoura Mist	Tom Johnston Jr.	9-2	40.04	1
2nd	Black Earl	Ted Dickson	2-1f	40.05	4
3rd	Owners Guide	Tony Jowett	25-1	40.31	6
4th	Columns Corner	John Gibbons	7-2	40.67	5
5th	Frame That	Ted Dickson	14-1	40.85	3
6th	Dangerous Lad	Joe Pickering	9-4	00.00	2

Gold Collar, Catford (Sep 22, 555m, £5,000)
Pos	Name of Greyhound	Trainer	SP	Time	Trap
1st	Gayflash	Paddy Milligan	7-2	35.08	5
2nd	Corduroy	John Honeysett	4-1	35.54	1
3rd	Quest for Gold		12-1	35.60	2
4th	Im A Smasher	Norah McEllistrim	10-1	35.86	4
5th	Taranaki	Peter Rich	7-2	36.16	6
6th	Dangerous Lad	Joe Pickering	7-4f	00.00	3

The Grand Prix, Walthamstow (Sep 29, 640m, £5,500)
Pos	Name of Greyhound	Trainer	SP	Time	Trap
1st	Frame That	Ted Dickson	11-2	39.57	1
2nd	Roystons Supreme	Adam Jackson	11-2	39.69	5
3rd	Brainy Prince	Geoff De Mulder	2-1	39.71	2
4th	Black Earl	Ray Iremonger	15-8f	39.79	4
5th	Strange Dame	Phil Rees Jr.	8-1	39.85	6
6th	Seagulls	Gunner Smith	16-1	39.99	3

Cesarewitch, Belle Vue (Oct 6, 815m, £3,000)
Pos	Name of Greyhound	Trainer	SP	Time	Trap
1st	Roystons Supreme	Adam Jackson	7-4	51.47	2
2nd	Cloutie Comment	George Curtis	7-1	51.53	4
3rd	Karnos Lady		11-8f	51.77	1
4th	Portland Dusty	Frank Melville	20-1	51.89	5
5th	Lynns Pride		7-1	51.99	6
6th	Corelish Ron	Brian Jay	16-1	52.00	3

Oaks, Harringay (Nov 2, 475m, £1,750)
Pos	Name of Greyhound	Trainer	SP	Time	Trap
1st	Sunny Interval	Phil Rees Jr.	12-1	28.77	4
2nd	Kilmagoura Mist	Tom Johnston Jr.	11-4	28.80	3
3rd	Kings Lace		10-1	28.86	2
4th	Masslock Lady	George Curtis	10-1	28.89	5
5th	Certain Style	Terry Keith	2-1f	29.01	6
6th	Trinas Baby	Edna Wearing	11-4	29.07	1

== Totalisator returns ==
Extended content

The totalisator returns declared to the licensing authorities for the year 1979 are listed below.

Stadium	Turnover £
London (White City)	7,905,509
London (Walthamstow)	7,630,996
London (Wimbledon)	5,848,415
London (Harringay)	4,120,864
Romford	3,722,154
London (Catford)	3,411,092
London (Wembley)	3,323,693
Brighton & Hove	3,116,599
Slough	2,891,961
Manchester (Belle Vue)	2,838,682
Birmingham (Hall Green)	2,453,519
Edinburgh (Powderhall)	2,143,634
Crayford & Bexleyheath	2,083,446
Birmingham (Perry Barr, old)	1,798,197
Southend-on-Sea	1,735,488
Newcastle (Brough Park)	1,693,168

Stadium	Turnover £
Glasgow (Shawfield)	1,587,686
Sheffield (Owlerton)	1,536,270
Leeds (Elland Road)	1,468,622
Wolverhampton (Monmore)	1,169,108
Bristol (Eastville)	981,641
London (Hackney)	959,881
Gloucester & Cheltenham	932,580
Derby	908,209
Yarmouth	874,426
Ramsgate	752,516
Portsmouth	731,711
Newcastle (Gosforth)	709,980
Rochester & Chatham	673,251
Oxford	533,299
Poole	522,825
Reading	508,507

Stadium	Turnover £
Coventry	499,405
Willenhall	497,531
Middlesbrough	476,980
Milton Keynes	472,971
Ipswich	420,570
Hull (Old Craven Park)	396,472
Manchester (White City)	369,691
Leicester	344,470
Cradley Heath	304,187
Swindon	288,765
Rye House	269,309
Henlow (Bedfordshire)	253,537
Cambridge	131,990
Norton Canes	100,000
Long Eaton	91,115
