= Hackney Wick Stadium =

Former stadium in Hackney, London

Coordinates: 51°32′49″N 0°1′17″W

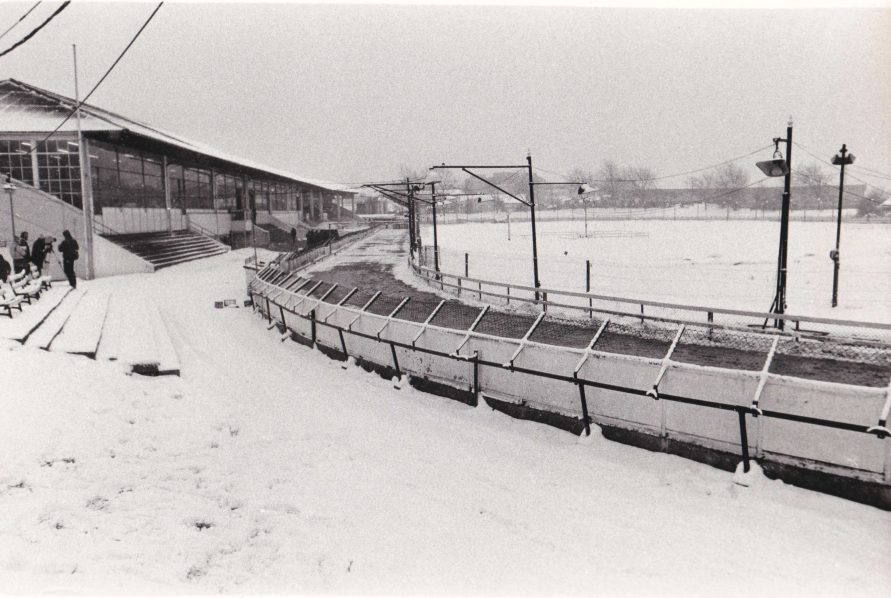
- The Stadium in January 1979
- Interactive map of Hackney Wick Stadium
- Location: Hackney, London

Construction
- Opened: 1932
- Closed: 1997

Hackney Wick Stadium was a greyhound racing and speedway stadium located at Waterden Road in Hackney Wick, London, England.

== Origins ==
The site chosen for the stadium was on land known as Hackney Marshes west of the River Lea and on the west side of the Waterden Road. The stadium was constructed from September 1931 until 1932 and cost £70,000 to build and after completion £18,000 in wages had been paid to the builders.

== Opening ==
Hackney opened On Friday 8 April 1932 under the affiliation of the British Greyhound Tracks Control Society (BGTCS) the rival to the larger National Greyhound Racing Club. Thirteen thousand people attended the first night and witnessed Marjorie Graves, MP for South Hackney officially open the track. The capacity of the track was put between 30,000 and 50,000 and a totalisator had been installed for the first night. A greyhound called Bullseye became the first ever winner at the track. Although the meeting was advertised as the first official meeting there had been a dress rehearsal two days previously on Wednesday 6 April which attracted 12,000 people.

The company responsible for the project was Hackney Wick Stadium Ltd headed by Managing Director Arthur Gilbert and Racing Manager Fred Whitehead with William Chandler also holding shares in the new company, Chandler would in due course buy the Crooked Billet independent track and turn it into Walthamstow Stadium one year later.

== Greyhound racing history ==
After World War II Hackney Wick and Hendon Greyhound Stadium merged to become the Hackney and Hendon Greyhounds Ltd company. The resident kennels featured six ranges with each able to house up to fifty greyhounds, paddocks sat next to each range with cooking facilities and a veterinary surgeon on site. The kennel fees were 17s 6d for each greyhound.

In 1948, Stanley Pay became the Racing Manager after Fred Whitehead was promoted to Director of Racing for both Hackney and Hendon. Pay was later replaced by Hendon Racing Manager D G Lewis before Michael Marksbecame Racing Manager for three decades until the day the stadium closed. The stadium offered eight buffet and licensed bars during racing held on Thursday and Saturday nights at 7.45pm. The circuit had a circumference of 472 yards and the greyhounds raced behind an 'Outside Sumner' hare system. Trainers in the 1960s included Annetts, Reg Bosley, Brown, Colebrooke, Cox, Paddy Gordon, Hedley and Lionel Maxen.

In the 1970s Mr G.Crookbank the track's chief electrician had invented photoelectric timing gear that would revolutionise the sport. Hand timing would become a thing of the past after Crookbank came up with the idea that a greyhound's race time could be recorded electronically. The invention known as 'Automatic Ray Timing' would remain as the timing method until the advent of modern computer timing. The Hackney sales became a major feature of business throughout the year, these sales became a prominent way for buying and selling greyhounds in London.

In 1969 Park Royal Stadium and New Cross Stadium both closed resulting in the Bookmakers Afternoon Greyhound Service (BAGS) being switched to Hendon and Hackney, the racing image of Hackney would change forever as it became the number one BAGS track. Afternoon meetings were introduced and eventually there would be no evening meetings at the track with the Saturday matinee BAGS replacing the Saturday night.

In 1970 businessman George Walker, brother of boxing champion Billy Walker arranged a reverse takeover of Hackney and Hendon Greyhounds Stadium Ltd. This meant his private company bought a public company and the new merger resulted in a new company called Brent Walker. This resulted in the end for the Hendon Greyhound Stadium because it was sold to make way for the UK's first stand-alone shopping centre on the site that would soon be known as the Brent Cross shopping centre.

It was not until the closure of sister track Hendon that Hackney Wick hosted a competition of note. The Guineas long associated with Park Royal had switched to Hendon in 1969 which in turn now found its way to Hackney. Three years later 'The Lead' was introduced and would also become a valuable addition to the calendar. In 1976 local hound Westmead Champ trained by Pam Heasman reached the final of the English Greyhound Derby and was voted Greyhound of the Year.

Hackney fell out with the NGRC in 1987 when the governing body announced that they would charge £300 to a track staging a BAGS meeting covered by Satellite Information Services (S.I.S) plus ten per cent of the tracks BAGS fees. Hackney refused and Ladbrokes took legal advice over the situation but all BAGS tracks would eventually pay a fee to the NGRC. Another race called the Lincoln was hosted by Hackney from 1986 and in 1988 Minnies Siren trained by Terry Duggan won the BBC Television Trophy. Brent Walker bought William Hill/Mecca from Grand Metropolitan in 1989 and one year later leading trainer John 'Ginger' McGee Sr. joined the track.

== Renovation and closure ==
During 1991 it transpired that Brent Walker had amassed debts of £1.2 billion, George Walker was removed from the board and the banker took control of the company's assets. With the bank controlling matters there were numerous rumours about the future of the track. By 1994 the stadium had been acquired by a company called London Stadium Hackney Ltd who were in turn owned by Fleetfoot Racing formed in 1992 by ex-Lloyds broker and racing journalist Robert Parker. Work began on an ambitious project including a £12 million restaurant, leading trainers were recruited and the stadium was rebranded 'The London Stadium'.

At the end of 1994 Robert Parker left the company as its director to be replaced by Stephen Rea. Beset with construction problems and internal disagreements the original £14 million scheme to develop the neglected stadium had run into serious problems. Extra cash was raised by rights issues with companies including Rothschild, Henderson Venture Managers and Samuel Montagu. In October 1995 the new stadium was finally ready offering first-class facilities and significantly high prize money. However, on the reopening night and despite a capacity crowd the stadium went into receivership the same evening. Investigations began and banker, Stephen Welton, was pursued by LWT reporter Trevor Phillips and questioned for the Board's failure to conduct due diligence on a prospective buyer who turned out to be an undischarged bankrupt. Parker appeared on Roger Cook's ITV's television program The Cook Report and allegations were also made against Stephen Rea. Fleetfoot Racing Ltd had lasted just three years, with the stadium closing on 4 January 1997.

The stadium was left derelict for several years until it was bought by the London Development Agency and demolished in 2003. The site was the location of the London Olympics Media Centre, the main media and broadcasting centre for the 2012 Summer Olympics and the 2012 Summer Paralympics.

== Speedway history ==
Speedway opened in 1935 at Hackney Wick Stadium and operated until 1996. The team raced under various names, known as Hackney Wick Wolves, Hackney Hawks, Hackney Kestrels and London Lions. The speedway scenes from the 1933 film Britannia of Billingsgate were shot at the stadium.

== See also ==
- Speedway Grand Prix of Great Britain

== Competitions ==
=== Lead ===
The track introduced the Lead sponsored by William Hill in 1975; at the same time they switched the 1,000 Guineas to a longer distance of 484 metres.

Year	Winner	Breeding	Trainer	Time	SP
1975	Baffling Bart	The Grand Silver - Mosaduva	Paddy Milligan (Private)	31.79	4/6f
1976	Bold Flight	Bold Invader – Fantastic Flight	P Hawke (Private)	32.27	10/11f
1977	Gaily Noble	Monalee Champion – Noble Lynn	John Coleman (Wembley)	31.81	3/1
1978	Special Addition	Special – Brownsgrove Lass	Draper (Sheffield)	31.82	8/1
1979	Decoy Duke	Westmead County – Rip Madam	Joe Cobbold Cambridge	31.55	7/1
1980	Democracy	Free Speech – Glen Eivers	Pat Mullins Cambridge	31.74	6/4f
1981	Sugarville Jet	Cairnville Jet – Santas Sugar	John Honeysett (Crayford)	31.86	10/11f
1982	Master Darby	Sole Aim – Aglish Pilgrim	Jerry Fisher (Reading)	31.72	4/6f
1983	Legrand	Shamrock Sailor – Well Honestly	George Curtis (Brighton)	32.12	7/2
1984	Ballyregan Bob	Ballyheigue Moon – Evening Daisy	George Curtis (Brighton)	31.07	4/7f
1985	Gabriel Andy	Lindas Champion – Gabriel Penny	Derek Knight (Brighton)	31.85	4/1
1986	Copper King	I'm Slippy - Cleona	Ken Reynolds (Monmore)	31.64	15/8f
1987	Killouragh Chris	Moreen Rocket – Moree Honey	Pete Beaumont (Sheffield)	32.30	15/8
1988	Bankers Benefit	Easy and Slow – Society Girl	Adam Jackson (Wembley)	31.88	7/2
1989	Labana Matthew	Matthews World – Labana Queen	Geoff De Mulder (Norton Canes)	31.86	1/1f
1990	Shanavulin Bingo	Michigan Man – Shanavulin Flash	Ernie Gaskin Sr. (Private)	31.58	8/11f
1991	Lets All Boogie	Carters Lad – Princess Alucard	John Coleman (Walthamstow)	32.08	9/4
1992	Daleys Denis	Daleys Gold – Lisnakill Flyer	Tom Pett (Canterbury)	31.67	10/11f

1975-1992 (523 metres)

== Track records ==
=== Pre metric records ===
Distance (yards)	Greyhound	Time	Date
300	Montforte Louis	16.45	30 July 1965
500	Don Gipsey	27.93	24 April 1948
525	Fitzs Bell	29.30	27 June 1963
525	Kybo Venture	29.52	1973
550	Parish Model	31.16	26 May 1947
550	Narrogar Ann	31.09	1949
550	Prince of Speed	30.61	21 July 1960
565	Kybo Venture	31.60	1973
570	Willing Billy	31.98	1970
700	Spotted Nice	40.20	1970
725	Surprising Paddle	41.36	20 July 1963
800	Chantilly Lace	45.86	14 April 1960
500 H	Dollys Prince	28.55	1963
550 H	Fairyfield Surprise	31.50	20 June 1963

=== Post metric records ===
Distance (metres)	Greyhound	Time	Date	Notes
247	Ballygroman Jim	15.17	1986	
260	Fast Copper	15.52	20 April 1994	
304	Clear Reason	18.02	1 March 1975	
400	Danesfort Slippy	25.01	26 March 1994	
440	Jurassic Park	26.70	23 September 1994	
484	London Spec	29.02	27 March 1976	
484	Lassa Java	28.86	24 March 1994	
484	Staplers Jo	28.56	1995	Guineas first round
523	Drynham Star	31.48	22 February 1975	
523	Wired To Moon	31.48	10 December 1977	
523	Sound Wave	31.48	12 January 1980	
523	Ballyregan Bob	31.07	11 December 1984	
640	Coolmona Road	39.95	22 August 1994	
683	Millies Corner	42.73	10 November 1983	
683	Blue Shirt	42.68	11 December 1984	
683	Ballyregan Bob	42.24	16 November 1985	
685	Coolmona Road	42.95	15 July 1994	
669	Mondays Style	41.80	24 October 1974	
740	Dublin Daisy	46.17	1 January 1976	
740	Tally Ho Sabrina	45.88	7 April 1980	
740	Swift Duchess	45.83	21 May 1986	
825	Winetavern Celt	53.78	12 December 1994	
909	Smart Decision	58.88	7 April 1994	
920	Wild Surprise	60.29	7 March 1985	
920	My Tootsie	59.21	1986	
400 H	Fancy Major	25.44	25 November 1994	
484 H	Westpark Clover	30.28	6 March 1984	
485 H	Kildare Slippy	30.10	20 July 1991	
485 H	Gis A Smile	29.72	7 February 1994	
523 H	Breakaway Slave	32.87	10 April 1982	
640 H	Freewheel Kylo	42.95	27 December 1993	
