= 1979 English Greyhound Derby =

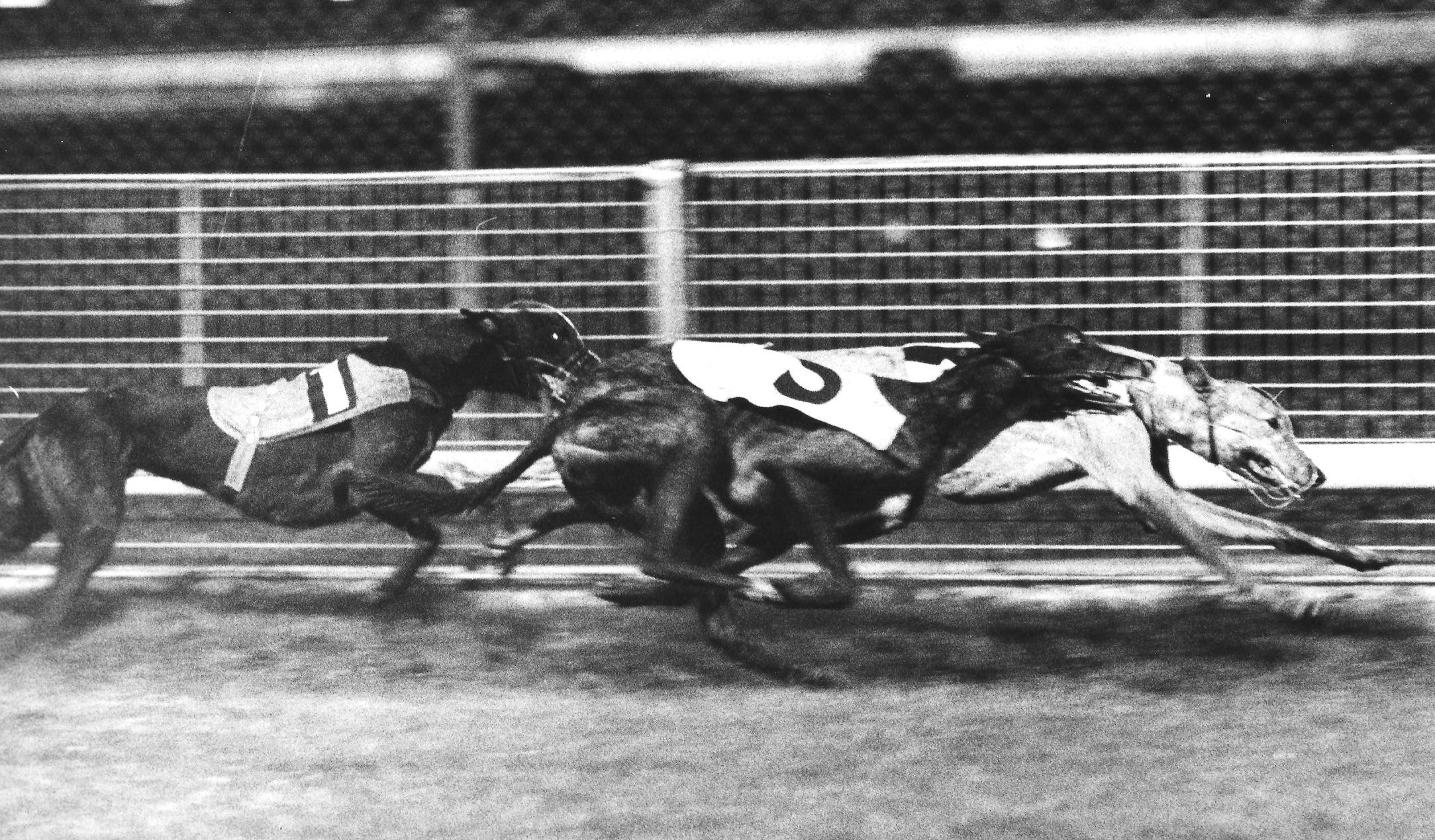
- Quarter Final, Sarahs Bunny leads Lacca Champion
- Location: White City Stadium
- Start date: 2 June
- End date: 23 June
- Total prize money: £25,000 (winner)

The 1979 Spillers Greyhound Derby took place during June with the final being held on 23 June 1979 at White City Stadium. The winner was Sarahs Bunny and the winning owner Roy Hadley received £25,000. The competition was sponsored by the Spillers.

== Competition Report ==
For the second year running the format of running heats at different tracks remained. Lacca Champion returned to defend his title as 215 entries were received including the team of Midlands-based Geoff DeMulder; they included ante-post favourite Desert Pilot and leading contenders Sarahs Bunny and Pat Seamur.

The first two rounds saw both Desert Pilot and Laurels winner Another Spatter suffer defeats and Pat Seamur go out altogether. By the time the third round started the field was down to 48 and the eight third round winners included Jebb Rambler, Its Stylish, Tyrean, Desert Pilot, Sarahs Bunny and Greenville Boy.

A difficult quarter final drew Desert Pilot, Lacca Champion and Sarahs Bunny in the same heat. All three ran well to qualify led home by Desert Pilot. Eric Pateman scored a double with Tyrean and Young Toby with Jebb Rambler completing the four quarter final winners. Tyrean, a former White City grader won his semi-final from Lacca Champion and First General and in the second semi Sarahs Bunny gained revenge on kennelmate Desert Pilot with Tough Decision splitting the pair. Jebb Rambler faded to fourth and missed out on the final.

The owners of Lacca Champion announced that he would be retired whatever the outcome of the race. Sarahs Bunny avoided trouble at the first bend to run out the winner from Lacca Champion. The defending champion had recovered well to finish second and could have won a second Derby but for the trouble.

== Final result ==
At White City (over 500 metres):

Position	Name of Greyhound	Breeding	Trap	SP	Time	Trainer
1st	Sarahs Bunny	Jimsun - Sugarloaf Bunny	6	3-1	29.53	Geoff De Mulder (Hall Green)
2nd	Lacca Champion	Itsachampion - Highland Finch	5	10-1	29.65	Pat Mullins (Cambridge)
3rd	Desert Pilot	Tain Mor - Dark Hostess	3	9-4	29.99	Geoff De Mulder (Hall Green)
4th	First General	Cobbler - Ballyguile	4	14-1	30.17	Tommy Johnston Jr. (Wembley)
5th	Tyrean	Myrtown - Forest Storm	1	15-8f	30.18	Eric Pateman (Private)
6th	Tough Decision	Minnesota Miller - Carters Drain	2	9-2	30.19	Tommy Kane (Ireland)

=== Distances ===
1½, 4¼, 2¼, short head, short head (lengths)
The distances between the greyhounds are in finishing order and shown in lengths. One length is equal to 0.08 of one second.

== See also ==
- 1979 UK & Ireland Greyhound Racing Year
