= Ipswich Stadium =

Greyhound racing stadium

Coordinates: 52°03′36″N 1°08′10″E

- Location: Ipswich, Suffolk
- Opened: 1930s
- Closed: 1988

Ipswich Stadium was a greyhound racing stadium situated in Ipswich, Suffolk.

== Origins and Opening ==
In the early 1930s the site chosen for a new stadium was directly north east of where the River Orwell and River Gipping meet and north of the London Road. It was originally called the Suffolk Stadium and independent racing (unaffiliated to a governing body) had already taken place before an official opening night got underway in 1935.

Promoter Mr Nat Shaw advertised and organised a first meeting described as being under official licensing on Wednesday 11 September 1935, one week after the original plan to open on 4 September. The wording was a public relations exercise because the licensing was that of the County Borough Council and not the National Greyhound Racing Club (NGRC) which was the official organisation to greyhound racing. Nevertheless, the stadium had been re-modelled, covered stands erected in the enclosures and the old kennels replaced. The reconstruction of the track was by Fisk & Co Ltd, the electric trackless hare was installed by H.Blann of London, safety hurdles and track equipment was supplied by Mortimer's of London and finally the wireless was by S.West of Ipswich.

Admission was free on opening night resulting in an attendance of 4,000 to watch the seven races. The first race was a 270-yard race and was won by a greyhound called Comas.

== 1936-1974 ==
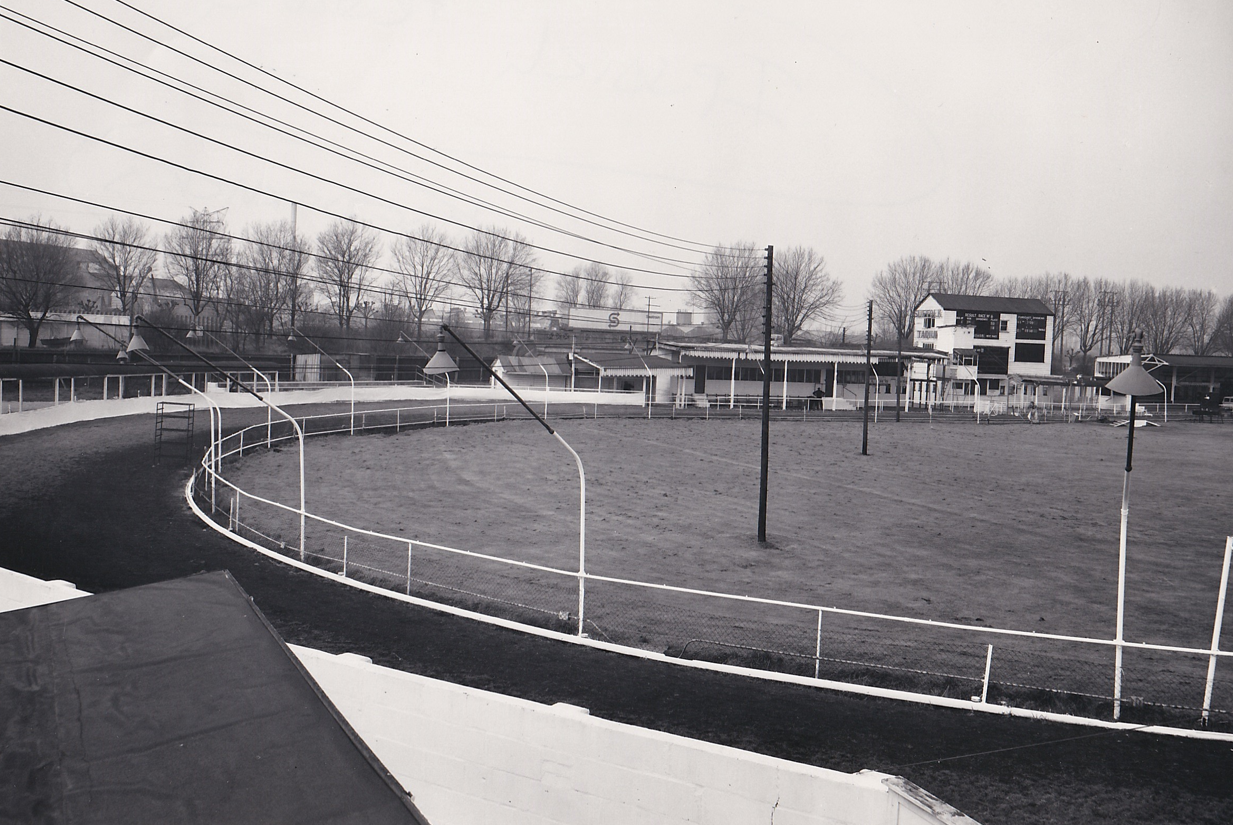
Ipswich Greyhound Stadium c.1970

Totalisator turnover in the first two years after the war was £594,645 & £417,101. The track continued throughout the 1950s and 1960s with racing held mainly on Wednesday and Saturday evenings at 7.15pm. The race distances were over 300, 500 and 700 yards and amenities included a licensed bar and snack bar and the totalisator was described as the Union Multi-speed wonder tote. The 405 yard circumference circuit had an 'Outside McKee' hare and the all-grass track was served by a spray watering system.

== Affiliated racing ==
Major change arrived in 1974 when the NGRC offered the chance to independent tracks to race under the NGRC permit scheme, a scheme designed to allow official status at a fraction of the expected cost increases. Ipswich Stadium Ltd under the control of Ernie Wedon took up the offer. Wedon had also been responsible with Len Franklin for Yarmouth Stadium's construction in 1940 and was also Racing Manager at Ipswich. A new stand was built costing £100,000 and a new computerised tote was added. The Suffolk Derby and St Leger became the tracks major events and the first race held under NGRC rules was on 2 February 1974.

Metric changes from yards to metres resulted in race distances of 277, 437 & 647m and during 1977 a new consortium headed by Tom Stanley and Bill Davis took over from Ernie Wedon. Stanley arrived as Director of Racing following the closure of Rayleigh Weir Stadium and Davis was to be the Racing Manager. Further track changes resulted in a new circumference of 375m and race distances of 258, 440, 628 & 810 metres behind an 'Outside Sumner' hare.

Track trainer Tom Lanceman started supplying runners to Southend Stadium in 1979 becoming one of the first dual attachment trainers in the country and Ipswich appointed one of the leading trainers in the country, Joe Cobbold from Cambridge. The Cobbold kennels won the 1980 Scottish Greyhound Derby with Decoy Sovereign, the 1980 TV Trophy with Decoy Boom followed by the Laurels with Echo Spark in 1981.

== Scurlogue Champ ==
Ipswich was connected with the legendary Scurlogue Champ which was trained by local handler Ken Peckham. The greyhound alongside Ballyregan Bob was responsible for a 1980s boom for the entire industry and became a national TV star after winning two BBC Television Trophy competitions in 1985 & 1986.

== Closure ==
Despite the 1980s boom Ipswich failed to flourish and closed its doors on the 17 February 1988. The last winner was Albert Skelton's Ventry Joe. Owner Bill Davis had been told to vacate the premises by the local council who had been informed by the Department of Environment that Bentray Investments had won an appeal to build warehousing on the site next to their Texas superstore business whose parent company was the Ladbroke Group. Davis a former trainer received a reported £2 million in the deal and the site was built on and today is occupied in the area where the Dunelm and the Range stores stand.

== Competitions ==
=== Suffolk Derby ===
Year	Winner	Breeding	Trainer	Time	SP
1974	Bealkiller Diver	Sallys Yarn – Bealkilla Queen		27.73	
1975	Black Flint	Shy Prairie – Clane Flint	George Carr (Private)	28.82	
1976	Sunmount Lark	Monalee Arkle – Oakmont Rover	Bowler Mills (Private)	28.44	25-1
1977	Secret Crook	Spectre – Brook Doll	T Batterbee (Ipswich)	27.07	5-1
1978	Clean Dinner	Monalee Arkle – Auburn Kid	John Coleman (Wembley)	26.60	
1979	Johns Luck	Westmead Bounty - Kiltean Fawn	John Coleman (Wembley)	27.04	2-1f
1980	Taciad	Kudas Honour – Faoide Look		27.78	
1981	Bann Merry		Ken Peckham (Private)	27.04	3-1
1982	Swift Rapier	Lindas Champion – Ballinderry Moth	Barney O'Connor (Walthamstow)	26.48	2-5f
1983	Bennys Comrade			27.47	
1984	Ballyhea Spirit	Ahaveen Spitfire – Back In Action		27.23	
1985	Chiltern Sam	Glenroe Hiker – Tina Monday	Peggy Cope (Milton Keynes)	27.10	
1986	Rathbeg Parade	Glenroe Blue – Form Book	Tony Dennis (Romford)	26.50	
1987	Another Mixture	Cronins Bar – Roaring Moth		26.92	

== Track records ==
Distance	Greyhound	Time	Date
300y	Fishpond		26 June 1965
300y	Thunderbird I	16.50	15 July 1967
300y	The Whistler	16.50	22 July 1967
500y	Fish Pond		04 August 1965
500y	Barons Way	27.96	02 September 1967
700y	Marcella	39.94	10 October 1964
258m	Night Runner	15.15	1987
440m	Swift Rapier	26.48	1987
628m	Choice Rock	38.39	1987
810m	Scurlogue Champ	51.44	19 September 1984
