= TV Trophy (greyhounds) =

Greyhound racing competition

Television Trophy
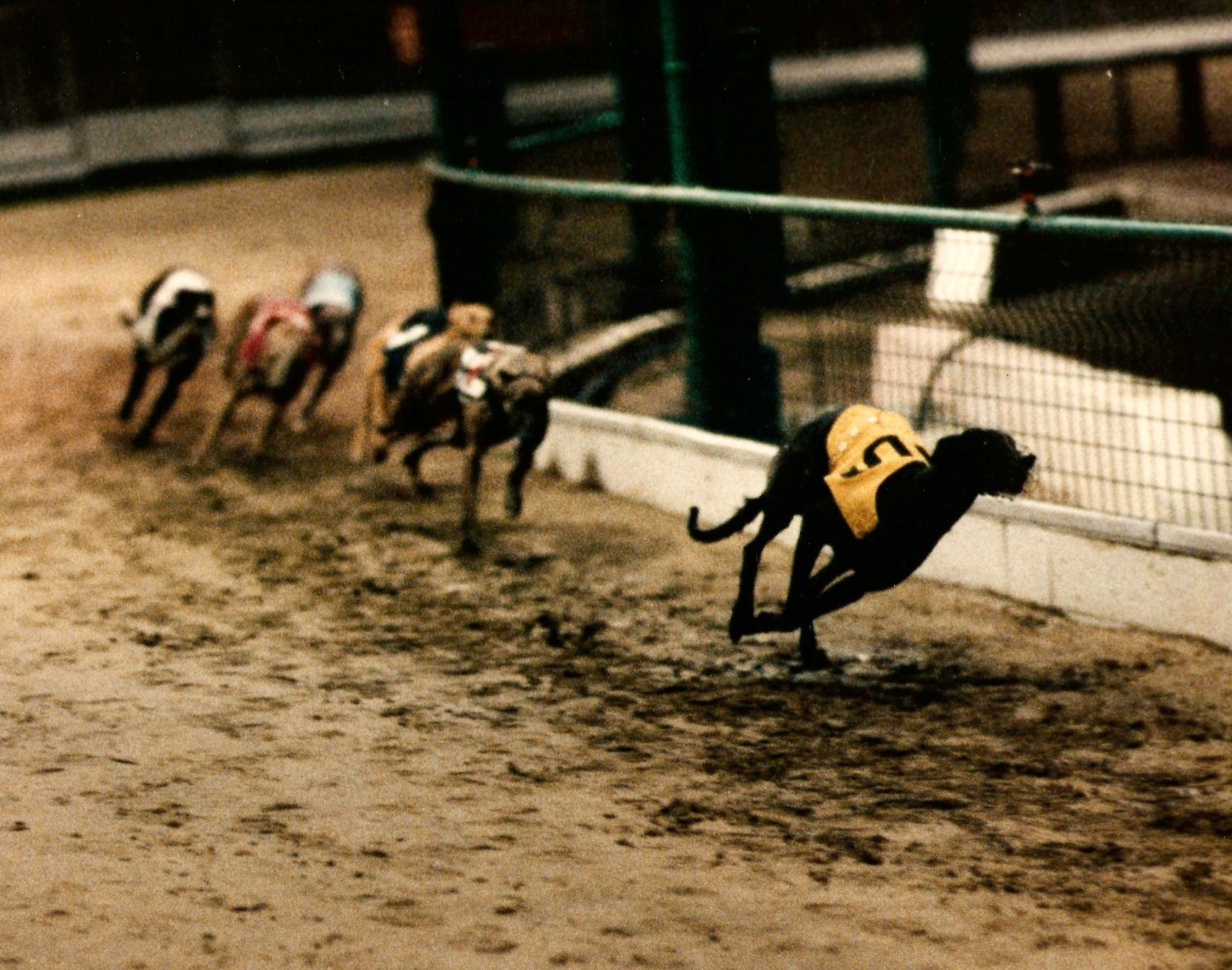
- Shropshire Lass leads Chicita Banana in 1990
- Class: Category 1
- Location: Various venues
- Inaugurated: 1958
- Sponsor: Time Greyhound Nutrition

Race information
- Distance: marathon distance
- Surface: Sand
- Purse: £15,000 (winner)

The Television Trophy (TV Trophy for short) is a greyhound racing competition held annually. It was inaugurated in 1958 and shown on the BBC. A different venue was chosen each year over the marathon distance of the relevant track. The competition consisted of heats (normally three) and a final one week later.

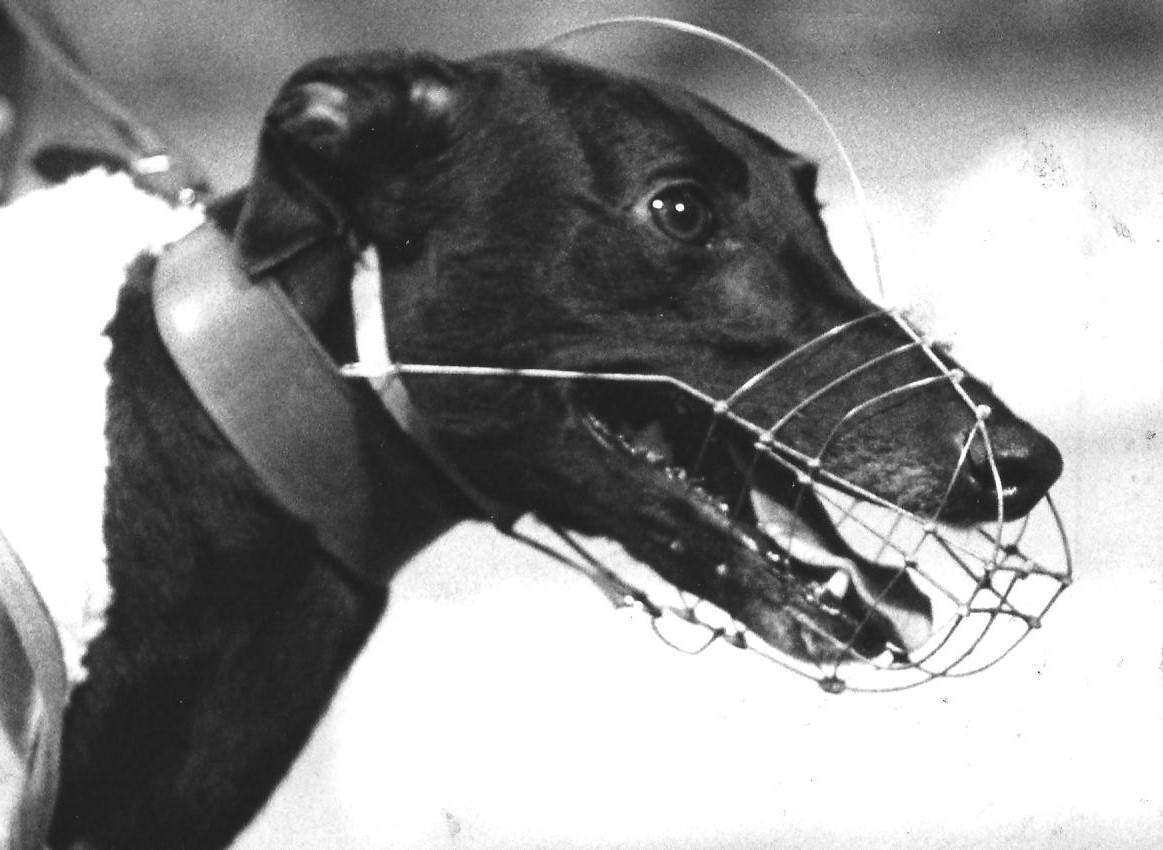
Scurlogue Champ won the TV Trophy twice

The BBC continued to televise the event from 1958 until 1996 on Sportsview (later Sportsnight). When Sportsnight ended the competition coverage it switched to Sky Sports which resulted in two editions of the 1997 event, the first being the last BBC event and the second sponsored by the Evening Standard being the inaugural Sky event. In 2018 the Greyhound Board of Great Britain, who hold the rights of the competition, invited tracks to tender for its hosting following the shock closure of Towcester Greyhound Stadium. Crayford and Romford were chosen for the 2018 and 2019 editions.

Scurlogue Champ, Ericas Equity, Midway Skipper and Aayamza Royale are the only greyhounds to have won the event twice, while trainers Mark Wallis has trained five winners.

== Sponsors ==
- 1958–1997 (BBC)
- 1997–2000 (Evening Standard)
- 2001–2001 (Countrywide Steel & Tubes)
- 2002–2009 (William Hill)
- 2010–2010 (Betfair)
- 2011–2011 (Blue Square)
- 2013–2013 (Paddy Power)
- 2014–2014 (Roto Roof Windows)
- 2015–2017 (Colossus Bets)
- 2012, 2018, 2021, 2023 (Ladbrokes)
- 2019–2022 (Coral)
- 2024–2024 (Stadium Bookmakers)
- 2025–2025 (Time Greyhound Nutrition)

== Past winners ==
Year	Winner	Breeding	Trainer	Time (sec)	SP	Venue & Distance	Notes
1958	Town Prince	Small Town - Orphan Princess	Leslie Reynolds (Wembley)	28.14	20/1	(Wimbledon) 500y	
1959	Don't Divulge	The Grand Champion - Ennell Gale	Leslie Reynolds (Wembley)	38.72	5/1	(West Ham) 700y	
1960	Crazy Paving	Magourna Reject - Minorcas Judy	Charles Payne (Private)	51.22	100/7	(Harringay) 880y	
1961	Chantilly Lace	Coolkill Nigger - Fire Beat	Jimmy Clubb (Private)	52.38	3/1	(Belle Vue) 880y	Track record
1962	Avis	Polonius - Twenty Smackers	Jimmy Rimmer (Wembley)	51.30	8/13f	(Wembley) 880y	Track record
1963	Curraheen Bride	Hi There - Tallow Bride	Bill Kelly (Clapton)	52.32	4/1	(Wimbledon) 880y	
1964	Hillstride	Knock Hill Chieftain - Miss Lorraine	Tom Perry (Private)	51.37	6/4f	(Powderhall) 880y	
1965	Lucky Hi There	Hi There - Olives Bonny	Jimmy Jowett (Clapton)	51.35	13/8f	(Wimbledon) 880y	
1966	Bedford	Steady The Man - Over Beyond	Bob Thompson (Romford)	52.46	20/1	(Walthamstow) 880y	
1967	Spectre II	Crazy Parachute - Supreme Witch	Jim Hookway (Owlerton)	50.09	1/1f	(Brighton) 880y	Track record
1968	Shady Begonia	Pigalle Wonder - Castle Swan	Norman Oliver (Brough Park)	50.53	2/1f	(Romford) 880y	
1969	Cash For Dan	Movealong Donal - Cash For Carrick	Ben Parsons (White City - Nottingham)	49.44	5/4f	(White City - London) 880y	Track record
1970	Hi Diddle	Spectre - Scintillas Spark	Pam Heasman (Private)	51.95	10/1	(Belle Vue) 880y	
1973	Leading Pride	Spectre - Conigar Goddess	George Curtis (Brighton)	51.16	2/1f	(Wimbledon) 880y	
1974	Stage Box	The Grand Silver - Crubs Up	Natalie Savva (Bletchley)	51.75	16/1	(White City - London) 880y	
1975	Lizzies Girl	Newdown Heather - Knock Rose Lady	Ted Williams (Private)	52.16	7/4jf	(Monmore) 815m	Track record
1976	Aughadonagh Jock	Blackrath Motion - Levalley Flash	Brian Jay (Perry Barr)	52.77	12/1	(Belle Vue) 815m	
1977	Montreen	Moordyke Spot - Avondale	Harry Bamford (Belle Vue)	52.40	13/2	(Walthamstow) 820m	
1978	Westown Adam	Westmead County - Adamstown Belle	Natalie Savva (Bletchley)	52.27	11/4	(Walthamstow) 820m	
1979	Weston Blaze	Westmead County - Weston Star	Reg Young (Bletchley)	53.16	5/1	(Hall Green) 815m	
1980	Tread Fast	Glin Bridge - Edenvale Lady	Graham Sharp (Walthamstow)	53.20	12/1	(Wembley) 850m	
1981	Decoy Boom	Westmead County - Ka Boom	Joe Cobbold (Ipswich)	54.27	7/4f	(Perry Barr) 830m	
1982	Alfa My Son	Alfa Boy - Tough Jackie	Leon Steed (Cambridge)	52.41	9/2	(Belle Vue) 815m	
1983	Sandy Lane	Maplehurst Star - Pla Irish Imp	George Curtis (Brighton)	52.43	7/4	(Walthamstow) 820m	
1984	Weston Prelude	Gaily Noble - Weston Princess	Arthur Hitch (Oxford)	52.14	4/1	(Wimbledon) 820m	
1985	Scurlogue Champ	Sand Man - Old Rip	Ken Peckham (Ipswich)	51.64	1/5f	(Monmore) 815m	Track record
1986	Scurlogue Champ	Sand Man - Old Rip	Ken Peckham (Ipswich)	52.65	2/5f	(Brough Park) 825m	
1987	Glenowen Queen	Yellow Ese - Rikasso Monica	Dick Hawkes (Walthamstow)	53.37	7/1	(Oxford) 845m	
1988	Minnies Siren	Easy And Slow - Fenians Minnie	Terry Duggan (Hackney)	52.50	16/1	(Hall Green) 815m	Track record
1989	Proud To Run	Mathews World - Run With Pride	Harry White (Canterbury)	55.25	4/5f	(Catford) 820m	Track record
1990	Shropshire Lass	Ballyregan Bob - Chocolate Satin	Richard Hubble (Private)	52.48	11/4	(Walthamstow) 820m	
1991	Jennys Wish	Kyle Jack - Easy Mary	Eric Jordan (Hove)	52.44	12/1	(Monmore) 815m	
1992	Fortunate Man	Ben G Cruiser - Lindas Dance	Tony Fell (Private)	55.70	6/4f	(Belle Vue) 855m	
1993	Heavenly Lady	Manorville Sand - Black Sancisco	Linda Mullins (Walthamstow)	51.40	6/1	(Wimbledon) 820m	
1994	Jubilee Rebecca	Pond Mirage - Lively Bid	Gordon Rooks (Brough Park)	53.13	2/1	(Sunderland) 827m	
1995	Last Action	Chet - Sunshine Penny	John Wileman (Monmore)	53.68	10/11f	(Oxford) 845m	
1996	Suncrest Sail	Low Sail - Sarahs Surprise	Charlie Lister OBE (Nottingham)	51.75	7/2	(Walthamstow) 820m	
1997	Thornfield Pride	Fearless Mustang - Thornfield Sophi	Yvonne Morris (Private)	52.17	12/1	(Hall Green) 815m	
1997	Moanrue Slippy	Murlens Slippy - Atheas Delight	Kelly Rockman (Harlow)	51.35	5/1	(Wimbledon) 820m	
1998	Note Book	Ratify - Book Shelf	Geoff Adams (Peterborough)	54.75	5/1	(Wimbledon) 868m	
1999	Hollinwood Poppy	Dempsey Duke - Hollinwood Major	Mick Clarke (Stainforth)	54.89	10/1	(Wimbledon) 868m	
2000	Sexy Delight	Some Picture - Spring Rose	Charlie Lister OBE (Private)	54.51	9/4f	(Wimbledon) 868m	
2001	Killeacle Phoebe	Smooth Rumble - Blonde Returns	Brian Clemenson (Hove)	54.27	1/1f	(Wimbledon) 868m	
2002	Serious Dog	Top Honcho - Fly Venue	Paul Young (Romford)	55.14	4/1	(Wimbledon) 868m	
2003	Ericas Equity	Smooth Rumble - Mosney Flyer	Paul Young (Romford)	54.62	6/4	(Wimbledon) 872m	
2004	Double Take	Carlton Bale - Metric Flower	Andy Heyes (Belle Vue)	55.22	11/10f	(Wimbledon) 872m	
2005	Ericas Equity	Smooth Rumble – Mosney Flyer	Paul Young (Romford)	55.75	5/4f	(Wimbledon) 872m	
2006	Roxholme Girl	Pacific Mile – Gilded Choice	Carly Philpott (Private)	55.86	4/5f	(Belle Vue) 878m	
2007	Spiridon Louis	Droopys Vieri – Early Flight	Lorraine Sams (Crayford)	53.42	4/7f	(Yarmouth) 843m	
2008	Flying Winner	Flying Penske – Wise Winner	Chris Lund (Doncaster)	55.82	1/2f	(Doncaster) 868m	Track record
2009	Midway Skipper	Top Honcho – Midway Tomsscout	Henry Chalkley (Henlow)	56.22	10/1	(Newcastle) 895m	
2010	Midway Skipper	Top Honcho – Midway Tomsscout	Henry Chalkley (Henlow)	52.91	5/1	(Kinsley) 844m	Track record
2011	Knockies Hannah	Maxie Rumble-Smooth Knockeen	John Mullins (Sittingbourne)	57.30	7/4	(Sittingbourne) 893m	
2012	Blonde Reagan	Hometown Boy Nga-Swift Babe	Mark Wallis (Yarmouth)	51.98	9/4	(Monmore) 835m	
2013	Musical Gaga	Hondo Black – Ask Louise	Dean Childs (Hove)	52.94	1/2f	(Yarmouth) 843m	
2014	King Kane	College Causeway – Shaws Dilemma	Diane Henry (Henlow)	55.58	1/1f	(Sheffield) 915m	Track record
2015	Ballymac Bonnie	Head Bound – Zulu Nikita	Liam Dowling (Ireland)	55.44	2/1jf	(Towcester) 906m	
2016	Borna Mindy	Westmead Hawk – Borna Client	Diane Henry (Private)	56.57	7/2	(Towcester) 906m	
2017	Goldies Hotspur	Aero Majestic – Slick Sapphire	Patrick Janssens (Towcester)	55.45	16/1	(Towcester) 906m	
2018	Savana Winner	Ballymac Eske – Old Refrain	Diane Henry (Henlow)	56.87	4/1	(Crayford) 874m	
2019	Bumblebee Bullet	Romeo Recruit – Dundrum Pearl	Mark Wallis (Henlow)	59.26	14/1	(Romford) 925m	
2020	Aayamza Royale	Ballymac Eske – Ascot Lydia	Mark Wallis (Henlow)	61.05	1/1f	(Hove) 945m	
2021	Aayamza Royale	Ballymac Eske – Ascot Lydia	Mark Wallis (Henlow)	55.00	8/13f	(Monmore) 900m	Track record
2022	Space Jet	Droopys Jet – Volcano	Matt Dartnall (Central Park)	58.86	4/9f	(Hove) 955m	
2023	Bellmore Sally	Droopys Sydney – Belmore Lucy	James Fenwick (Newcastle)	56.38	10/11f	(Crayford) 874m	
2024	Bubbly Inferno	Good News – Bubbly Firebird	Paul Young (Romford)	52.37	16/1	(Oxford) 847m	Track record
2025	Mongys Wild	Roxholme Olaf – Banter Breeze	Mark Wallis (Private)	57.41	11.8	(Towcester) 942	
