= Laurels (English greyhound race) =

British greyhound racing competition

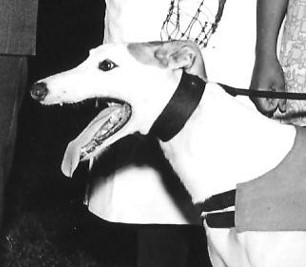
- 1966 champion Super Fame
- Class: Original Classic
- Location: Perry Barr Stadium
- Inaugurated: 1930
- Sponsor: Arena Racing Company

Race information
- Distance: 480 metres
- Surface: Sand
- Purse: £12,500 (winner)

The Laurels is an original classic greyhound competition held at Perry Barr Stadium. It was run at Wimbledon Stadium from 1930 until 1997. It then moved to Belle Vue Stadium in 1998 and remained there until 2017 when it switched to Newcastle Stadium. After two years at Newcastle and a cancellation in 2020 due to COVID-19 it switched to Perry Barr in 2021.

competition lost its Category 1 status but was still regarded as one of the most valuable prizes during the racing year. The Arena Racing Company gained the prestigious competition in 2017 from the GRA and it returned to Category 1 status in 2022.

== Venues and distances ==
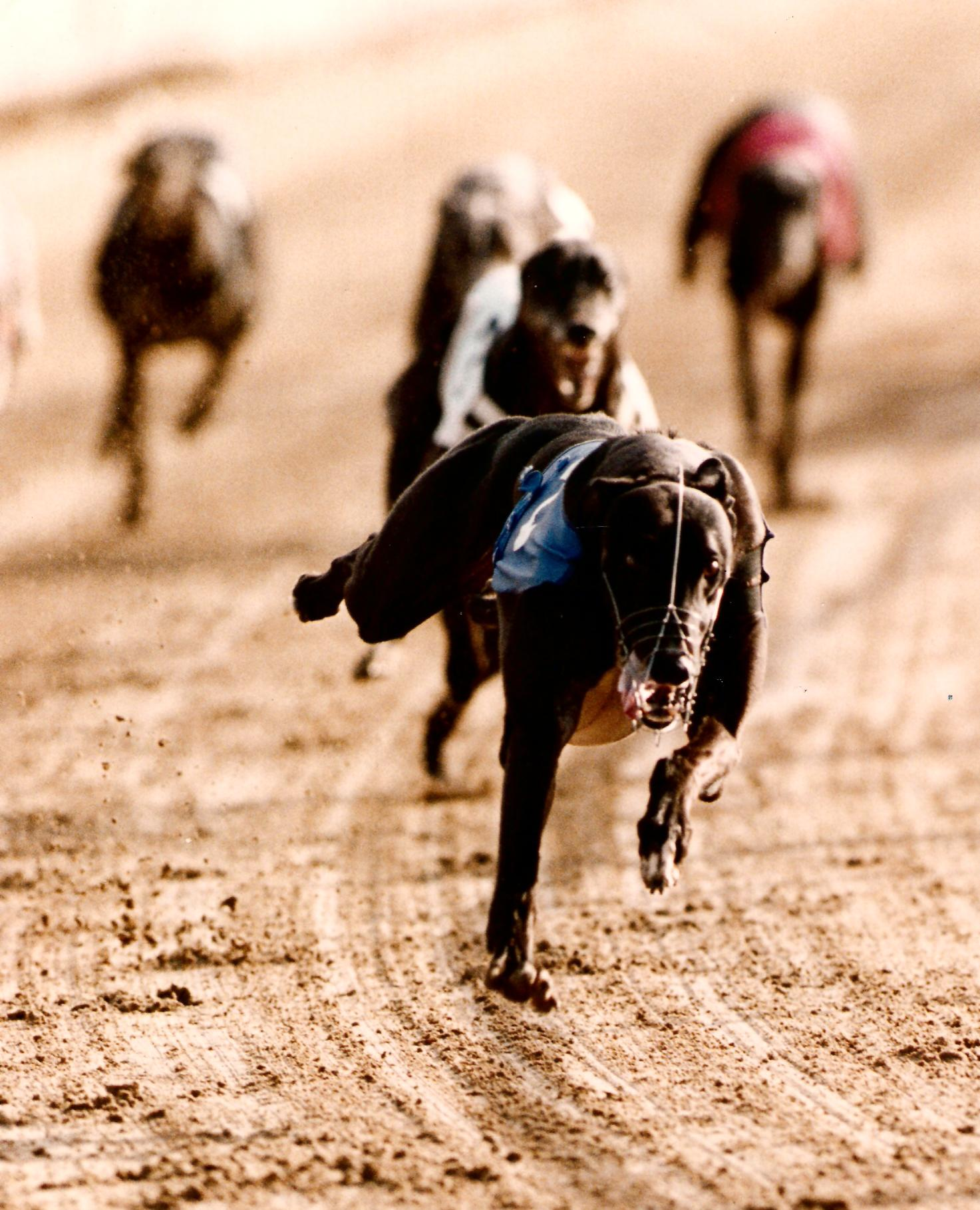
1991 Glengar Ranger

- 1930–1974 (Wimbledon Stadium, 500 y)
- 1975–1997 (Wimbledon Stadium, 460 m)
- 1998-1998 (Belle Vue Stadium, 460 m)
- 1999–2002 (Belle Vue Stadium, 465 m)
- 2003–2003 (Belle Vue Stadium, 480 m)
- 2004–2004 (Belle Vue Stadium, 465 m)
- 2005–2016 (Belle Vue Stadium, 470 m)
- 2017–2019 (Newcastle Stadium, 480 m)
- 2021–2025 (Perry Barr Stadium, 480 m)

== Sponsors ==
- 1994–1998 (Ike Morris Bookmakers)
- 2003–2006 (William Hill)
- 2007–2009 & 2011 (Betfred)
- 2010–2010 (Stan James)
- 2012–2012 (Ladbrokes)
- 2013–2015 (ECC Timber)
- 2016–2016 (Racing Post GTV)
- 2017–2017 (O'Tooles Boxing Health & Fitness Byker)
- 2018–2018 (Conlon Family And Pinpoint Recruitment)
- 2019–2019 (O'Tooles Gym Byker)
- 2021–2025 (Arena Racing Company)

== Past winners ==
Year	Winner	Breeding	Trainer	Time (sec)	SP	Notes/ref
1930	Kilbrean Boy	Loafer - Clinker Lass	Sidney Orton (Wimbledon)	29.20	1/1	
1931	Future Cutlet	Mutton Cutlet - Wary Guide	Sidney Probert (Wembley)	28.52	2/5f	
1932	Beef Cutlet	Mutton Cutlet - Burette	John Hegarty (White City Cardiff)	28.47	4/6f	World & Track Record
1933	Wild Woolley	Hautley - Wild Witch	Jimmy Campbell (Belle Vue)	28.80	100/30	
1934	Brilliant Bob	Other Days - Birchfield Bessie	Sidney Orton (Wimbledon)	28.46	7/1	
1935	Kitshine	Macoma - Pleasant Note	Arthur 'Doc' Callanan (Wembley)	29.05	3/1	
1936	Top O'the Carlow Road	Town Rattler - Clarenbridge	Sidney Orton (Wimbledon)	28.39	5/2	
1937	Ballyhennessey Sandhills	White Sandills - Soraca Deas	Sidney Orton (Wimbledon)	28.25	4/5f	
1938	Ballyhennessey Sandhills	White Sandills - Soraca Deas	Sidney Orton (Wimbledon)	28.50	11/8f	
1939	Musical Duke	Suil King - Musical Bride	Cornelius Crowley (Park Royal)	28.42	1/1f	
1940	April Burglar	Danielli - Tennysons Works	Ken Appleton (West Ham)	28.56	100/8	
1945	Burhill Moon	Bay Moon - Mona Mac	Sidney Orton (Wimbledon)	28.42	1/3f	
1946	Shannon Shore	Well Squared - Second Row	Leslie Reynolds (Wembley)	28.26	7/1	
1947	Rimmells Black	Manhattan Midnight - Drishogue	Stan Biss (Clapton)	28.77	8/1	
1948	Good Worker	Tanimon - Dolly Meadway	Jack Daley (Ramsgate)	28.49	5/2	
1949	Ballymac Ball	Lone Seal - Raging Tornado	Stan Martin (Wimbledon)	28.61	4/5f	
1950	Ballymac Ball	Lone Seal - Raging Tornado	Stan Martin (Wimbledon)	28.19	15/8	
1951	Ballylanigan Tanist	Mad Tanist - Fly Dancer	Leslie Reynolds (Wembley)	28.37	8/11f	
1952	Endless Gossip	Priceless Border - Narrogar Ann	Leslie Reynolds (Wembley)	27.96	2/11f	
1953	Polonius	Mad Tanist - Culpurnia	Tom 'Paddy' Reilly (Walthamstow)	28.04	7/2	
1954	Coolkill Chieftain	Celtic Chief - Coolkill Darkie	Jack Harvey (Wembley)	28.05	1/2f	
1955	Duet Leader	Champion Prince - Derryluskin Lady	Tom 'Paddy' Reilly (Walthamstow)	28.25	7/4	
1956	Duet Leader	Champion Prince - Derryluskin Lady	Tom 'Paddy' Reilly (Walthamstow)	28.13	1/1f	
1957	Ford Spartan	Polonius - Harrow Glamour	Dennis Hannafinn (Wimbledon)	27.89	2/7f	
1958	Granthamaian	Barrowside - Silver Splash	Jack Harvey (Wembley)	28.57	10/1	
1959	Mighty Hassan	Ollys Rambler - B For Bawn	Jack Harvey (Wembley)	28.01	5/1	
1960	Dunstown Paddy	Champion Prince - Geffs Linnett	Tom 'Paddy' Reilly (Walthamstow)	28.02	5/1	
1961	Clonalvy Pride	Solar Prince - Asmena	Jack Harvey (Wembley)	27.66	2/1jf	
1962	Tuturama	Coming Champion - Knockstown Queen	Frank Sanderson (Private)	27.83	4–6f	
1963	Dalcassian Son	Champions Son - Dalcassian Elf	Austin Hiscock (Belle Vue)	28.08	7/2	
1964	Conna Count	Mile Bush Pride - Aughadown Molly	Dennis Hannafinn (Wimbledon)	28.08	100/7	
1965	Conna Count	Mile Bush Pride - Aughadown Molly	Paddy McEvoy (Wimbledon)	28.13	11/2	
1966	Super Fame	Super Orange - Maggie From Cork	Nora Gleeson (Wimbledon)	28.05	9/2	
1967	Carry on Oregon	Oregon Prince - Gormanstown Wonder	Clare Orton (Wimbledon)	27.89	8/13f	
1968	Ambiguous	Crazy Parachute - The Mistress	Paddy McEvoy (Wimbledon)	28.10	8/1	
1969	Ardine Flame	Greenane Flame - Cuma	Jack Kinsley (Wembley)	27.96	8/1	
1970	Sole Aim	Monalee Champion - Yurituni	David Geggus (Walthamstow)	28.04	6/4f	
1971	Black Andrew	Spectre - Loyal Fire	Randy Singleton (White City, London)	27.96	11/2	
1972	Cricket Bunny	Printers Prince - Cricket Lady	Joe Booth (Private)	28.11	100/30	
1973	Black Banjo	Monalee Champion - Brook Densel	Barney O'Connor (Walthamstow)	27.93	5/2cf	
1974	Over Protected	Monalee Arkle - Spotlight Cindy	John Coleman (Wembley)	28.00	7/4	
1975	Pineapple Grand	Supreme Fun - Marys Snowball	Frank Baldwin (old Perry Barr)	27.77	3/1	
1976	Xmas Holiday	The Grand Silver - Pineapple Baby	Phil Rees Sr. (Wimbledon)	27.66	3/1	
1977	Greenfield Fox	Burgess Heather - Skipping Chick	Ted Dickson (Slough)	27.41	4/5f	
1978	Jet Control	Toms Pal - Morning Rose	Bertie Gaynor (old Perry Barr)	27.45	9/2	
1979	Another Spatter	Barbadus - Small Spatter	Joe Pickering (White City, London)	27.75	7/2	
1980	Flying Pursuit	Kudas Honour - Faoide Look	John Gibbons (Crayford)	27.89	6/4f	
1981	Echo Spark	Liberty Lad - Lady Armada	Joe Cobbold (Ipswich)	27.84	5/1	
1982	Lauries Panther	Shamrock Sailor - Lady Lucey	Terry Duggan (Romford)	27.79	9/2	
1983	Darkie Fli	Ballinamona Sam - Star Fli	F.Stevens (Cambridge)	27.87	2/1f	
1984	Amenhotep	Aquaduct Coach - Ladys Lib	Linda Mullins (Crayford)	27.82	7/1	
1985	Ballygroman Jim	Knockrour Tiger – Lee View Lady	Ernie Gaskin Sr. (Private)	27.68	7/4f	
1986	Mollifrend Lucky	Lauries Panther – Top Princess	Colin Packham (Reading)	27.48	4/6f	
1987	Flashy Sir	Sand Man – Cherry Express	Nick Savva (Milton Keynes)	27.52	11/4	
1988	Comeragh Boy	Moral Support – August Morning	Ernie Gaskin Sr. (Private)	27.86	6/4f	
1989	Parquet Pal	Game Ball – Hollands Kev	Arthur Hitch (Wimbledon)	27.68	9/4	
1990	Concentration	Im Slippy - Eliogarty	Ger McKenna (Ireland)	27.75	4/7f	
1991	Glengar Ranger	Carters Lad – Glengar Moss	Jimmy Fletcher (Canterbury)	27.47	6/4f	
1992	Balligari	Daleys Gold – Westmead Move	Nick Savva (Private)	27.37	6/4	
1993	Slipaway Jaydee	Im Slippy - Ballyvalican	John McGee Sr. (Reading)	27.61	9/4	
1994	Deenside Dean	Willie Joe – Deenside Sunset	Terry Dartnall (Wimbledon)	27.97	5/1	
1995	Demesne Bear	Barefoot Chief – Demesne Joy	Peter Payne (Romford)	27.94	14/1	
1996	El Grand Senor	Leaders Minstrel – Without Equal	Linda Mullins (Walthamstow)	27.52	9/4f	
1997	El Premier	Adraville Bridge – Droopys Alivsa	Linda Mullins (Walthamstow)	27.36	4/7f	
1998	Ardant Jimmy	Highway Leader – Ardant Peggy	Sandra Ralph (Monmore)	28.05	10/1	
1999	Derbay Flyer	Ayr Flyer – Brown Missile	Charlie Lister OBE (Private)	27.80	10/11f	
2000	Courts Legal	Always Good – Carrowkeal Mandy	Linda Jones (Walthamstow)	27.86	7/4	
2001	Pack Them In	Spiral Nikita – Supa Score	Andy Heyes (Belle Vue)	27.55	6/4f	
2002	Full Cigar	Frisby Full – Have A Cigar	Liz McNair (Private)	27.94	11/4	
2003	Knockeevan Magic	Knockeevan Star – Knockeevan Lucy	Peter Rich (Romford)	28.25	11/10f	
2004	Ningbo Jack	Honcho Classic – Pennys Spotlight	Charlie Lister OBE (Private)	27.60	4/1	
2005	Blonde Boss	Daves Mentor – Best Fancy	Charlie Lister OBE (Private)	27.86	5/2	
2006	Clash Harmonica	Fortune Mike – Clash Minnie	Charlie Lister OBE (Private)	27.88	3/1	
2007	Kylegrove Top	Top Honcho – Bangor Shirley	Julie Bateson (Private)	27.82	10/1	
2008	Boherna Best	Pacific Mile – Always On Air	Barrie Draper (Sheffield)	27.90	11/4	
2009	Sunoak Crystal	Hondo Black – Precious Beauty	Julie Calvert (Sunderland)	28.01	5/2	
2010	Elwick Chris	Brett Lee – Free To Air	Michael Walsh (Newcastle)	27.50	3/1	
2011	Eden Star	Top Savings – Aranock Val	Barrie Draper (Sheffield)	27.27	4/9f	
2012	Farloe Warhawk	Ace Hi Rumble-Wontbelong	Barrie Draper (Sheffield)	28.26	4/5f	
2013	Mileheight Alba	Ballymac Maeve – Giddyup Girl	Patrick Rosney (Private)	27.65	2/1f	
2014	Jordans Brianna	Wheres Pedro - Generosity	Charlie Lister OBE (Private)	28.28	5/1	
2015	Millwards Whitey	Ace Hi Rumble – Droopys Puzzle	Dean Childs (Crayford)	27.87	6/4f	
2016	Hiya Butt	Hondo Black – Hather For Pat	Hayley Keightley (Private)	27.49	5/4f	
2017	The Other Reg	Razldazl Jayfkay – The Other Peach	Pat Rosney (Private)	28.38	3/1	
2018	Nadurra Ross	Droopys Jet – Enda Causeway	John McLachlan (Shawfield)	28.46	5/1	
2019	Ice on Fire	Crash – Bigmans Grainne	James Fenwick (Newcastle)	28.57	1/4f	
2020	No race due to (COVID-19 pandemic)					
2021	Havana Class	World Class – Havana Lottie	Liz McNair (Private)	28.68	3/1jf	
2022	Signet Denver	Magical Bale – Forest Natalee	Kevin Hutton (Towcester)	28.14	11/4	
2023	Hawkfield Ozark	Laughil Blake – Brownstown Tango	Patrick Janssens (Towcester)	28.03	15/8f	
2024	Kilwest Ranger	Droopys Sydney – Ballymac Sanjose	Paul Harmes (Perry Barr)	28.38	9/2	
2025	Aayamza Sydney	Droopys Sydney – Aayamza Breeze	John Mullins (Towecester)	27.78	7/2	
