= Ted Williams (equestrian) =

British show jumper and greyhound racing trainer (1912–1993)

Personal information
- Nationality: British
- Discipline: Show jumping
- Born: 1912; United Kingdom
- Died: 1993 (aged 81)

Edward F. Williams known as Ted Williams (1912–1993) was one of the leading British show jumping riders in the 1950s and 1960s, especially with his horse Pegasus which was owned by Leonard and Nora Cawthraw of Wakefield.

== Equestrian ==
In 1957, he won the Airedale Stakes, riding an Australian mare named Dumbbell, owned by Nora Cawthraw, at Odsal Stadium, Bradford. In a single trip to the United States and Canada in the same year, he won all three major Grand Prix (Harrisburg, Toronto and New York) and jumped 27 clear rounds on Pegasus.

== Other interests ==
He appeared as a castaway on the BBC Radio programme Desert Island Discs on 23 January 1961.

Williams was mentioned in the House of Commons, on 28 February 1969, in a debate on Sunday trading.

== Greyhound racing ==
After retiring from show jumping he took out a greyhound trainer's licence under the rules of the National Greyhound Racing Club. He won the 1975 BBC Television Trophy with Lizzies Girl, at (Monmore).
