= Scottish Greyhound Derby =

Former Classic greyhound racing competition (1928-2019)

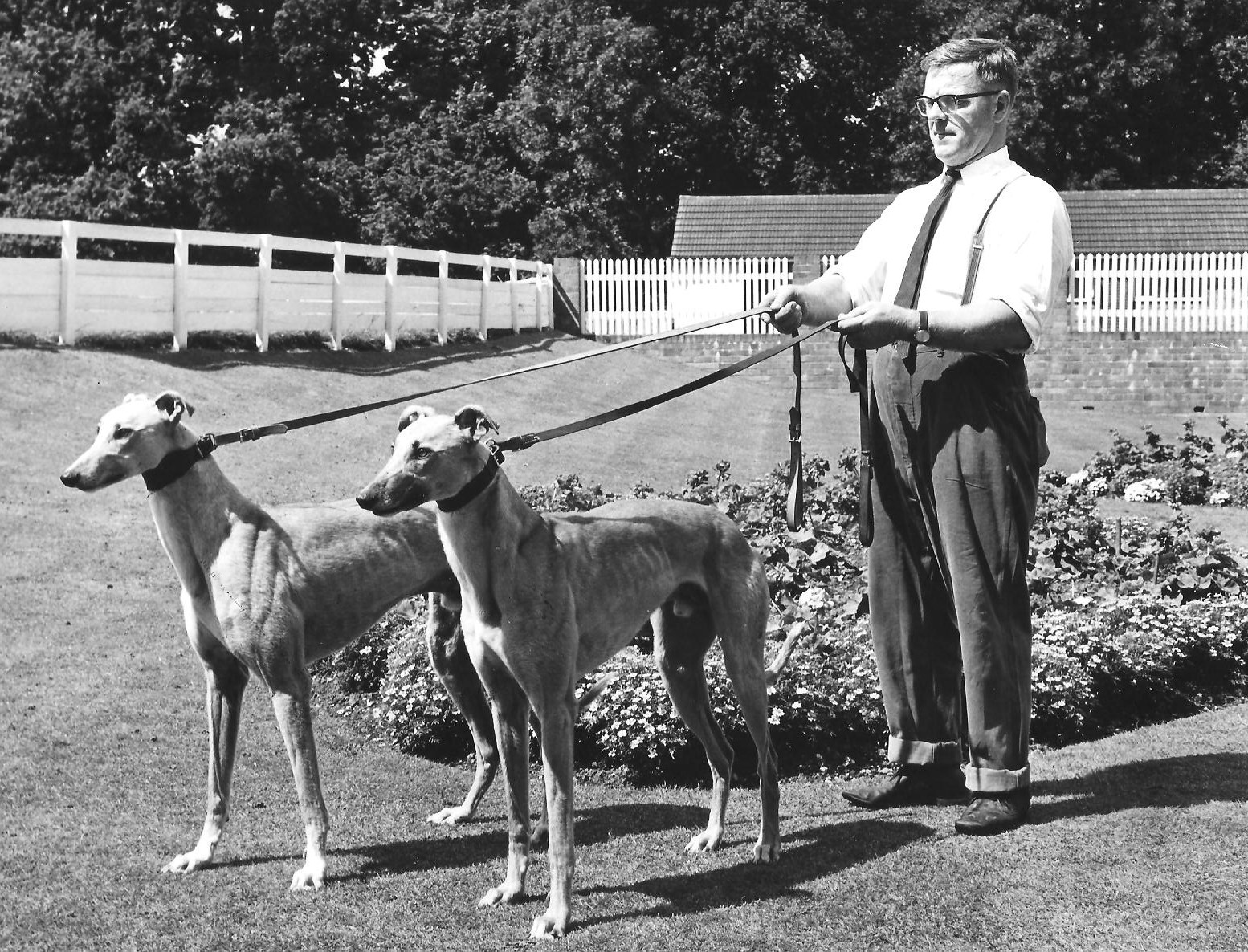
- Dusty Trail (far left)
- Class: Original Classic
- Location: Carntyne Stadium (1928–1968); Shawfield Stadium (1970–2019)
- Inaugurated: 1928
- Final run: 2019

Race information
- Surface: Sand

The Scottish Greyhound Derby was an original classic greyhound competition held from 1928 to 2019, at Carntyne Stadium and then Shawfield Stadium.

== History ==
The competition was introduced at Carntyne Stadium in 1928. It was held until 1968 at the track but with the closure of Carntyne the race switched at Shawfield from 1970 until 1985.

In 1988, the Greyhound Racing Association (GRA), moved the race to Powderhall Stadium in Edinburgh because they had the rights to the event and wanted it to take place at one of their tracks. After just two years it returned to Glasgow and Shawfield following the sale of Powderhall by the GRA.

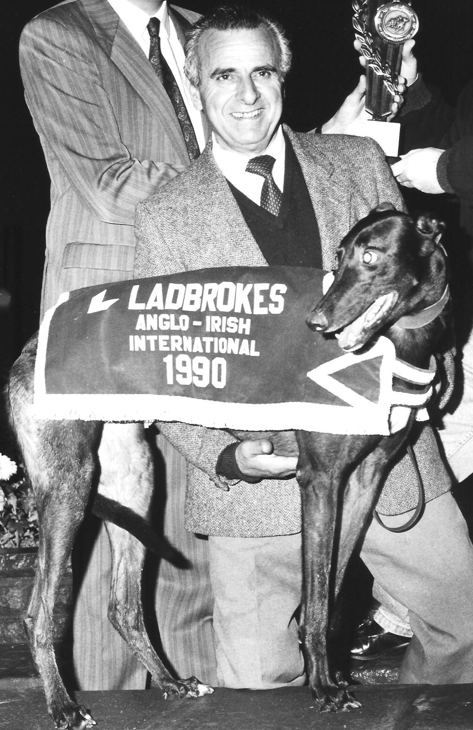
Westmead Harry and trainer Nick Savva in 1990

== Venues & Distances ==
- 1928–1968 (Carntyne 525 y)
- 1969 (Cancelled)
- 1970–1974 (Shawfield 525 y)
- 1975 (Shawfield 485 m)
- 1976 (Shawfield 505 m)
- 1977 (Shawfield 480 m)
- 1978–1985 (Shawfield 500 m)
- 1987–1988 (Powderhall 465 m)
- 1989–1994 (Shawfield 500 m)
- 1995–2019 (Shawfield 480 m)

== Sponsors ==
- 1972–1973 (Skol)
- 1982–1983 (Harp Lager)
- 1989–1990 (Ladbrokes)
- 1991–2003 (Regal)
- 2004–2005 (Totesport)
- 2006–2006 (BGRB)
- 2007–2007 (John R Weir Mercedes Benz)
- 2008–2009 (ibetX.com)
- 2010–2012 (Bettor.com)
- 2013–2014 (Ladbrokes)
- 2015–2019 (Racing Post Greyhound TV)

== Past winners ==
Year	Winner	Breeding	Trainer	Time (sec)	SP	Notes/ref
1928	Glinger Bank	Jamie - Wafer	John Snowball (Powderhall)	30.39	100/6	
1929	Clevaralitz	Irish Brigade II - Hall Queen	Alf Mulliner (Wembley)	30.87	3/1	
1930	Captured Half	Loafer - Rock Doe	Stan Biss (West Ham)	30.30	1/5f	
1931	Sister Olive	Lenin - Dulcinette	Mrs P. Collins (White City Glasgow)	30.65	3/1	
1932	Laverock	Golden Seal - Melksham Quite Happy	Unknown (White City Glasgow)	30.10	8/1	
1933	S.L.D	Gaulsmill - Kitty Kelly	Jack Tallantire (Powderhall)	30.30	4/9f	
1934	Olive's Best	Deemster - Sister Olive	Arthur'Doc'Callanan (Wembley)	29.90	7/4jf	
1935	Olive's Best	Deemster-Sister Olive	Arthur'Doc'Callanan (Wembley)	30.16	4/7f	
1936	Diamond Glory	Kilnagory-Ten Diamonds	Ronnie Melville (Private)	29.99	1/1f	
1937	Jesmond Cutlet	Beef Cutlet-Lady Eleanor	Dal Hawkesley (Catford)	29.83	9/4jf	
1938	Roeside Scottie	Creamery Border-Deemsters Olive	Michael Downey (Private)	29.53	1/1f	
1939	Misty Law II	Dee Rock-Devon's Shade	James Anderson (Powderhall)	29.60	5/1	
1940	Ballycurren Soldier	Noras Cutlet-Sergeants Wife	H.Irving (Carntyne)	29.65	4/5f	
1941	Lights O'London	Creamery Border-Life of Luxury	Joe Harmon (Wimbledon)	29.75	1/1f	
1942	Ballycurren Soldier	Noras Cutlet-Sergeants Wife	Michael Conroy (Carntyne)	29.94	1/1f	
1943	Bilting Hawk	Beef Cutlet-Bilting Talespin	Cecil Askey (Catford)	29.25	9/4	
1944	Gladstone Brigadier	Woodstock Darkie-Silver Gilt	Ken Newham (Warrington)	29.55	2/1f	
1945	Mondays Son	Orlucks Best-Monday Next	P.Moore (South Shields)	29.19	5/2jf	
1946	Lattin Pearl	Melksham Nobody-Come On Biddy	M.Gemmell (Shawfield)	29.53	11/10f	
1947	Trev's Perfection	Trevs Despatch-Friar Tuck	Fred Trevillion (Private)	29.25	9/4f	
1948	Western Post	Luck Post-Lonesome Sister	Frank Davis (Private)	29.45	8/1	
1950	Behattans Choice	Bahs Choice-Behattan	Bob Burls (Wembley)	29.35	4/6f	
1951	Rushton Smutty	Mad Tanist-Summer Froc	Frank Johnson (Private)	29.08	9/4	
1954	Rushton Mac	Rushton News-Rushton Panda	Frank Johnson (Private)	29.20	5/2	
1956	Quick Surprise	Champion Prince-Quick Enough	Pat Mullins (Portsmouth)	29.44	1/1f	
1957	Ballypatrick	The Grand Champion - D West	Cyril Beaumont (Belle Vue)	29.53	7/1	
1958	Just Fame	Colebreene Bell - More Fame	Tom Johnston Sr. (Carntyne)	29.36	4/1	
1959	Mile Bush Pride	The Grand Champion - Witching Dancing	Jack Harvey (Wembley)	29.41	2/7f	
1960	Rostown Genius	The Grand Genius - Rostown Lady	Joe Pickering (White City)	28.92	5/4f	
1961	Hey There Merry	Hi There - Merry Champion	Hugo Spencer (Portsmouth)	29.11	12/1	
1962	Dromin Glory	Hi There - Dromin Jet	John Bassett (Clapton)	29.09	4/1	
1963	We'll See	Knock Hill Chieftain - Bunnykins	Tom Johnston Jr. (Carntyne)	28.91	6/1	
1964	Hi Imperial	Hi There - Last Of The Lassies	Tom Johnston Jr. (Carntyne)	29.13	20/1	
1965	Clonmannon Flash	Prairie Flash - Dainty Sister	Jim Hookway (Owlerton)	29.00	2/1f	
1966	Dusty Trail	Printers Present - Dolores Daughter	Paddy Milligan (Private)	28.59	4/5f	
1967	Hi Ho Silver	Hurry There - Silver Isle	Norman Oliver (Brough Park)	28.90	5/2	
1968	Lisamote Precept	Hi Spark - Lisamote Queen	Joe Kelly (Leeds)	28.93	5/1	
1970	Brilane Clipper	Faithful Hope - Brilane Parachute	Joe Kelly (Leeds)	29.06	9/4f	
1972	Patricias Hope	Silver Hope - Patsicia	Adam Jackson (Clapton)	29.22	9/2	
1973	Dashalong Chief	Monalee Champion - Hopeful Glen	Adam Jackson (White City)	29.60	11/2	
1974	Cosha Orchis	Own Pride - Monalee Wizard	Jimmy Meechan (Shawfield)	29.20	12/1	
1975	Dromlara Master	Own Pride - Monalee Last	Bertie Gaynor (Perry Barr)	29.30	7/1	
1976	Flip Your Top	Own Pride - Whittle Off	Bob Young (Private)	30.56	11/10f	
1977	Amber Sky	Bright Lad - Quite Efficient	Peter Beaumont (Private)	29.08	6/4f	
1978	Pat Seamur	Tullig Rambler - Dainty Black	Geoff De Mulder (Hall Green)	30.52	11/4	
1979	Greenville Boy	Tullig Rambler - Greenville Lass	Pat Mullins (Cambridge)	30.49	6/4f	
1980	Decoy Sovereign	Westmead County - Ka Boom	Joe Cobbold (Ipswich)	30.68	4/1	
1981	Marbella Sky	Weston Blaze - Maries Kate	Ray Andrews (Belle Vue)	30.66	12/1	
1982	Special Account	Westmead County - Ka Boom	Natalie Savva (Milton Keynes)	29.99	1/1f	Track record
1983	On Spec	Westmead County - On Pot	Harry Crapper (Sheffield)	30.50	2/1f	
1985	Smokey Pete	Smokey Flame - Smokey Cotton	Kenny Linzell (Walthamstow)	30.29	7/2	
1987	Princes Pal	Cronins Bar - Ballea Oshkosh	Matt Travers (Ireland)	27.58	1/1f	
1988	Killouragh Chris	Moreen Rocket - Moreen Honey	Pete Beaumont (Sheffield)	28.75	6/4f	
1989	Airmount Grand	Daleys Gold - Airmount Jewel	Gerald Kiely (Ireland)	30.03	1/1f	
1990	Westmead Harry	Fearless Champ - Westmead Move	Natalie Savva (Milton Keynes)	29.62	5/4f	Track Record
1991	Phantom Flash	Flashy Sir - Westmead Seal	Patsy Byrne (Wimbledon)	29.77	1/4f	
1992	Glideaway Silver	Echo Spark - Cute Betty	Michael Compton (Norton Canes)	30.26	25/1	
1993	New Level	Murlens Slippy - Well Plucked	Harry Williams (Sunderland)	30.22	3/1	
1994	Droopys Sandy	Ardfert Sean - Droopys First	Francy Murray (Ireland)	29.39	1/1f	Track Record
1995	Solar Symphony	Live Contender - Cill Dubh Villa	Stuart Ray (Stainforth)	28.97	5/2jf	Track Record
1996	Burnpark Lord	Airmount Grand - Burnpark Lisa	Dave Hopper (Sheffield)	29.32	5/2	
1997	Some Picture	Slaneyside Hare - Spring Season	Charlie Lister OBE (Nottingham)	29.02	1/1f	
1998	Larkhill Jo	Staplers Jo - Westmead Flight	Nick Savva (Milton Keynes)	29.01	5/4f	
1999	Chart King	Trade Official - Clarinka Sand	Ralph & Karl Hewitt (Ireland)	28.98	4/5f	
2000	Knockeevan Star	Slaneyside Hare - Rubys Bridge	Tom Flaherty (Private)	29.19	3/1	
2001	Sonic Flight	Frightful Flash - Westmead Flight	Nick Savva (Private)	29.19	5/4	
2002	Priceless Rebel	Staplers Jo - Tinas Beauty	Paul Hennessy (Ireland)	29.08	5/2	
2003	Micks Mystic	Come On Ranger - Tracys Lady	Charlie Lister OBE (Private)	29.07	4/6f	
2004	Farloe Verdict	Droopys Vieri - She Knew	Charlie Lister OBE (Private)	28.79	11/4	Track Record
2005	Droopys Marco	Droopys Kewell - Little Diamond UK	Frazer Black (Ireland)	29.05	4/1	
2006	Fear Me	No Tail Told - Femme Fatale	Charlie Lister OBE (Private)	29.21	7/4jf	
2007	Fear Haribo	Larkhill Jo - Yamila Diaz	Charlie Lister OBE (Private)	28.76	10/11f	Track Record
2008	Tyrur Kieran	Honcho Classic – Tyrur Lee	Paul Hennessy (Ireland)	29.02	6/4jf	
2009	Cabra Cool	Big Daddy Cool – Cabra Dancer	Pat Buckley (Ireland)	28.83	4/1	
2010	Nambisco	Big Daddy Cool – Airport Boss	Carly Philpott (Private)	28.98	7/4f	
2011	Taylors Cruise	Royal Impact-Dairyland Sue	Charlie Lister OBE (Private)	28.99	5/2	
2012	Barefoot Allstar	Droopy Scolari – Newmarket Way	Paul Hennessy (Ireland)	28.76	7/4f	
2013	Ballymac Eske	Burnpark Champ – Ballymac Penske	Barrie Draper (Sheffield)	28.75	4/7f	
2014	Holdem Spy	Hondo Black – Have One More	Carol Weatherall (Private)	28.87	2/1f	
2015	Swift Hoffman	Makeshift – Swift Erin	Pat Rosney (Private)	28.98	6/4f	
2016	Hot Pipe	Head Bound - Sillott Mo	Jim 'Scotchie' Brown (Private)	29.09	25/1	
2017	Dorotas Woo Hoo	Ballymac Vic - Droopys Daneel	Charlie Lister OBE (Private)	28.77	7/4	
2018	The Other Reg	Razldazl Jayfkay - The Other Peach	Pat Rosney (Belle Vue)	28.87	5/2	
2019	Braveheart Bobby	Secreto - Leigh Fancy	Pat Buckley (Ireland)	28.88	3/1	
2020	2020 cancelled due to COVID-19 pandemic					
