= Chasewater Raceway =

Racing stadium in West Midlands, England

- Location: Pool Lane, west Brownhills, West Midlands
- Coordinates: 52°39′32″N 1°56′21″W
- Opened: 1970s
- Closed: 1988

Chasewater Raceway was a Harness racing, greyhound racing and speedway stadium on Pool Lane in Brownhills, West Midlands.

== Harness racing ==
A very large trotting track circuit was constructed in the 1970s between Pool Lane and Whitehorse Road in west Brownhills. A large grandstand which had been dismantled from the Prestatyn trotting track was built on site. The trotting track did not prosper and fell into decay closing in the late 1980s.

== Greyhound racing ==
The greyhound racing started in June 1981 with the huge grandstand built for the trotting track dwarfing the greyhound circuit. The greyhound racing was independent (not affiliated to the sports governing body the National Greyhound Racing Club) and was known as a flapping track which was the nickname given to independent tracks.

Racing took place on Tuesday and Thursday evenings. The track was 410 metres in circumference and had racing distances of 290, 450 and 700 metres. There was car parking for 300 vehicles and sixty kennels on site.

== Speedway ==
The raceway was used for long track speedway in April 1977.

== Closure ==
Greyhound racing finished in 1988 following storm damage and never reopened. It was demolished in 1998 making way for the M6 Toll Road.
