= Joe Cobbold =

British greyhound racing professional trainer

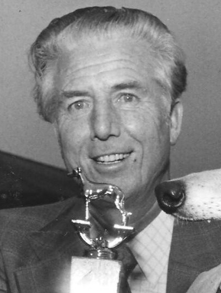

Personal information
- Born: 6 March 1927 Bury St Edmunds, Suffolk, England
- Died: 9 July 2003 (aged 76) Bury St Edmunds, Suffolk, England
- Occupation: Greyhound trainer

Sport
- Sport: Greyhound racing

Achievements and titles
- National finals: Derby wins: Scottish Derby (1980); Classic/Feature wins: Laurels (1981); Television Trophy (1981)

Ulick Charles "Joe" Cobbold (6 March 1927 – 9 July 2003) was an English greyhound trainer. He was the UK champion trainer in 1981.

== Profile ==
Cobbold ran his operation from the Utopia kennels Near Thetford in Norfolk and most of his greyhounds carried the prefix 'Decoy'. He joined Cambridge Stadium when it opened in 1978 and one year later in 1979 he steered Aglish Boss to runner-up in the BBC Television Trophy.

Assisted by his wife Doreen and initially by Gary and Brenda Baggs the kennel sent out Decoy Sovereign in the 1980 Scottish Greyhound Derby and fawn dog won the competition. The same greyhound finished runner-up that year in the St Leger.

The kennel had switched their attachment from Cambridge to Ipswich Stadium during 1981 and Cobbold won the 1981 Laurels with Echo Spark (owned by Ken Peckham of Scurlogue Champ fame). Decoy Boom was named Greyhound of the Year after winning the BBC TV Trophy, Longcross Cup, GRA Stakes, Scottish Marathon and Stow Marathon. In addition, Cobbold won the Trainers Championship to complete a highly successful year.

After retiring, he handed the licence to his son and daughter-in-law, Trevor and Pam, but continued to help out. Trevor set a record for the most open race British Bred runners in a year. Sadly, Trevor died from cancer in 1994 and the last runner sent out from the Utopia kennels was in 1999.

== Awards ==
He won the 1981 Greyhound Trainer of the Year and the 1981 Trainers Championship.
