= Norton Canes Stadium =

Sports venue in Staffordshire, England

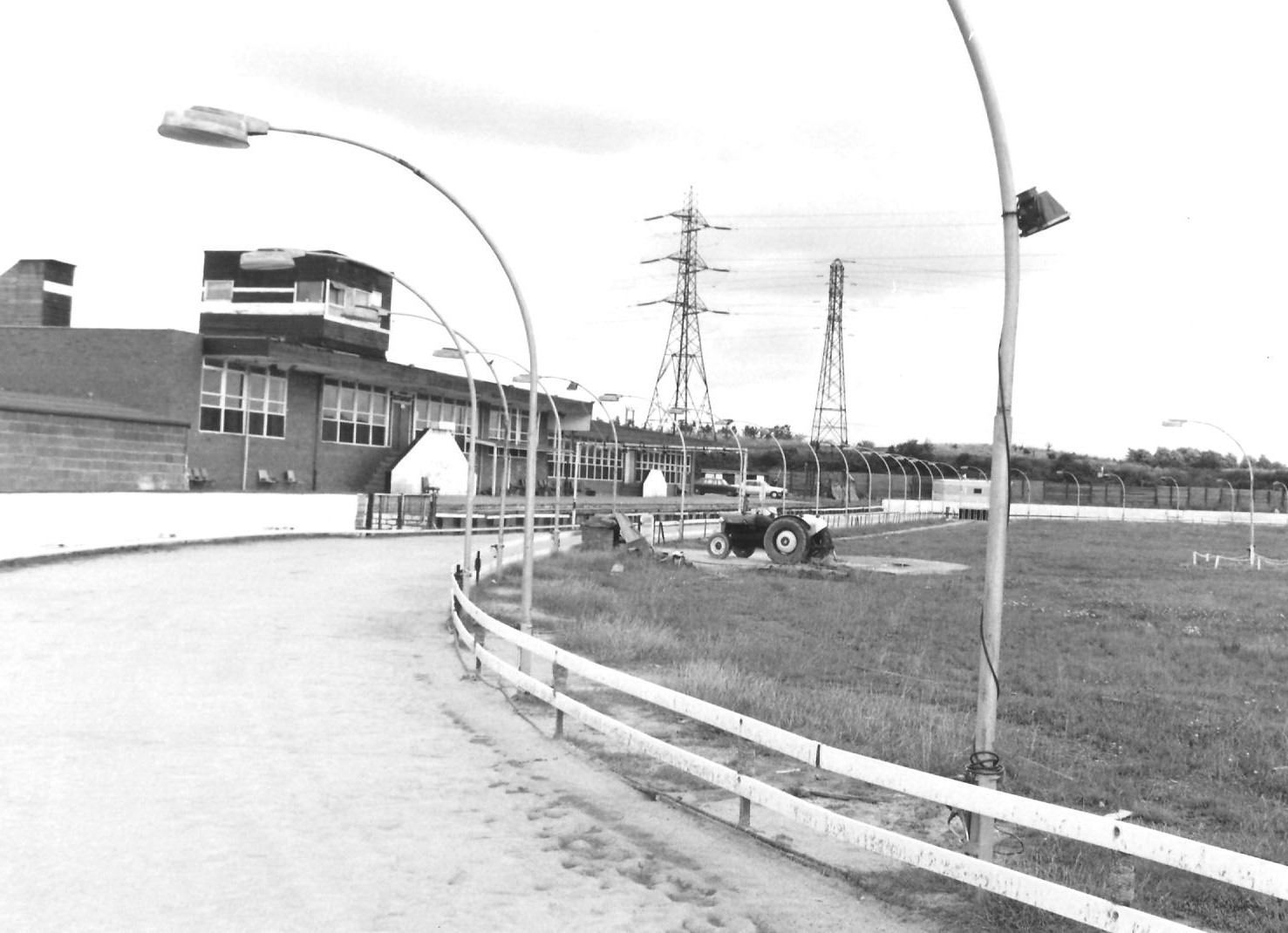
- Norton Canes Stadium in the 1980s
- Interactive map of Norton Canes Stadium
- Location: Norton Canes, near Cannock in Staffordshire
- Coordinates: 52°39′55″N 1°57′37″W

Construction
- Opened: 1974
- Closed: 1995

Norton Canes Stadium was a former greyhound racing track situated in Norton Canes, near Cannock in Staffordshire.

== Origins ==
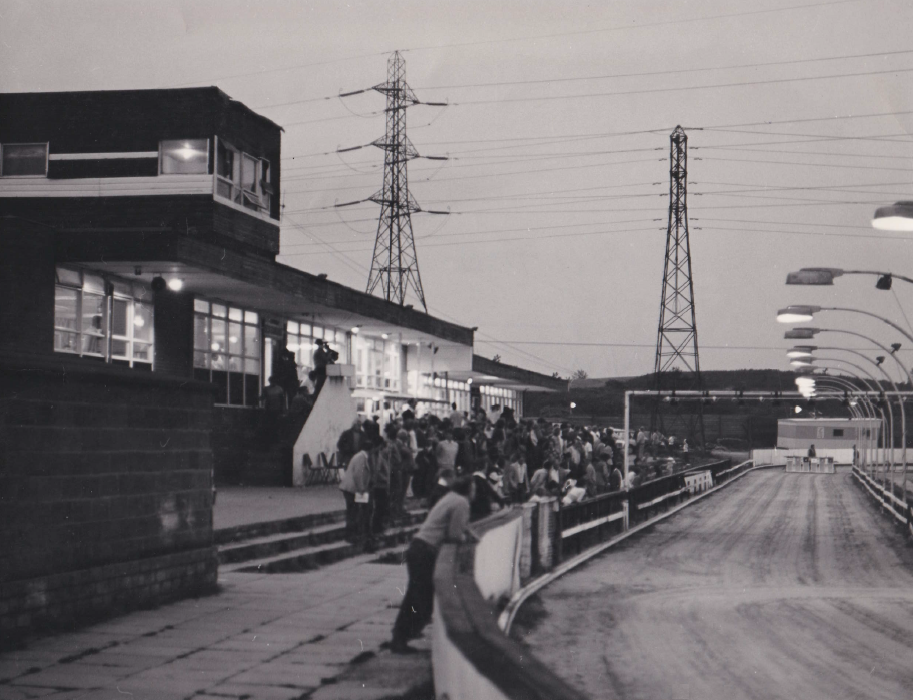
Norton Canes Stadium c.1975

Charles Southall built the track in 1974 and chose a site east of the village of Norton Canes on the west side of the Brownhills Road. The track was dwarfed by the large Chasewater reservoir on its eastern side.

== Opening ==
Racing began under the N.G.R.C permit scheme in 1975 and races were run over the distances of 265m, 440m, 617m, 792m and 969m. Facilities included a licensed club house and there was a car park for 400 vehicles, kennels for 75 greyhounds and a glass fronted covered stand.

== History ==
The management introduced two competitions called the Norton Canes Derby and the Champion Bitch Stakes. Stephen Rea took over the lease in 1980 at a time when a rival track the Chasewater Raceway opened. In 1984 Rea sold the lease to John Preece a businessman with an engineering firm in Stourbridge. The track enjoyed a popular spell with Preece as a promoter, the attendances went up and it attracted one of the sports leading trainers Geoff De Mulder.

DeMulder trained Fearless Ace when he won the Pall Mall Stakes in 1988 and in 1992 Glideaway Silver won the Scottish Greyhound Derby; The white and fawn dog was trained by Michael Compton. English Greyhound DerbyFinal appearances followed for Cooladine Style in 1989 and Fair Hill Boy and Galtymore Lad in 1990.

Other trainers included Norman Johnson, Sylvia Houlker, Melvin Baker, Russ Kinsey, Maurice Buckland and George Lightfoot and Harry Dodds trained Appleby Lisa who became the Gold Collar champion in 1991. Derek Pugh brought the Irish sales to Norton Canes for a short spell in the early nineties after selling Cradley Heath Stadium.

== Closure ==
Norton Canes came to an abrupt end on 31 July 1995 when Preece pulled out as promoter after struggling to keep the track profitable. The track then suffered a serious fire in March 1996 effectively ending any chance of sport returning to the site.

== Derelict ==
As of 2012 the site was still derelict awaiting planning permission for a housing development.

== Norton Canes Derby ==
Year	Winner	Breeding	Trainer	Time	SP	Notes
1975	Information	Bright Lad – Up Two	John Gibbons (Private)	27.64		
1976	Brookhouse Gent	Moordyke Charlie – Alderley Duchess	E Stanyer (Permit)	27.84	11-10f	
1977	Autumn Belin	Kilbelin Style – High Temperature	Geoff De Mulder (Hall Green)	27.85	4-6f	
1978	Shuna	Itsachampion – Move Sue	Ken Shearman (Permit)	27.16		
1990	Linthurst Rita	Buncarrig – Tinys Pet	Leo Pugh (Hall Green)	26.98	5-1	
1991	Cottesloe Champ	Road Whisper – Shanavulin Black	Deardon (Norton Canes)	27.35	7-2	

== Track records ==
Distance metres	Greyhound	Time	Date	Notes
265	Adam	15.01	07.06.1986	
440	Oakfield Colin	26.91	18.11.1983	
440	Larryandy	26.88	24.06.1991	
440	Mandies Supreme	26.88	21.10.1991	=equalled
440	Moral Start	26.77	22.11.1991	
570	Townview Snowy	35.79	1987	
570	Lucky Lagamore	35.63	02.12.1991	
617	Slaneyside Point	39.61	12.09.1983	
617	Murlens Panther	39.30	01.11.1989	
617	Lucky Lagamore	39.28	11.11.1991	
792	High July	53.03	1980	
792	Shropshire Lass	52.91	1991	
969	Shropshire Lass	65.53	24.11.1989	
440 H	Moreen Flamingoe	28.27	1987	
