= Milton Keynes Greyhound Stadium =

British speedway and greyhound racing stadium

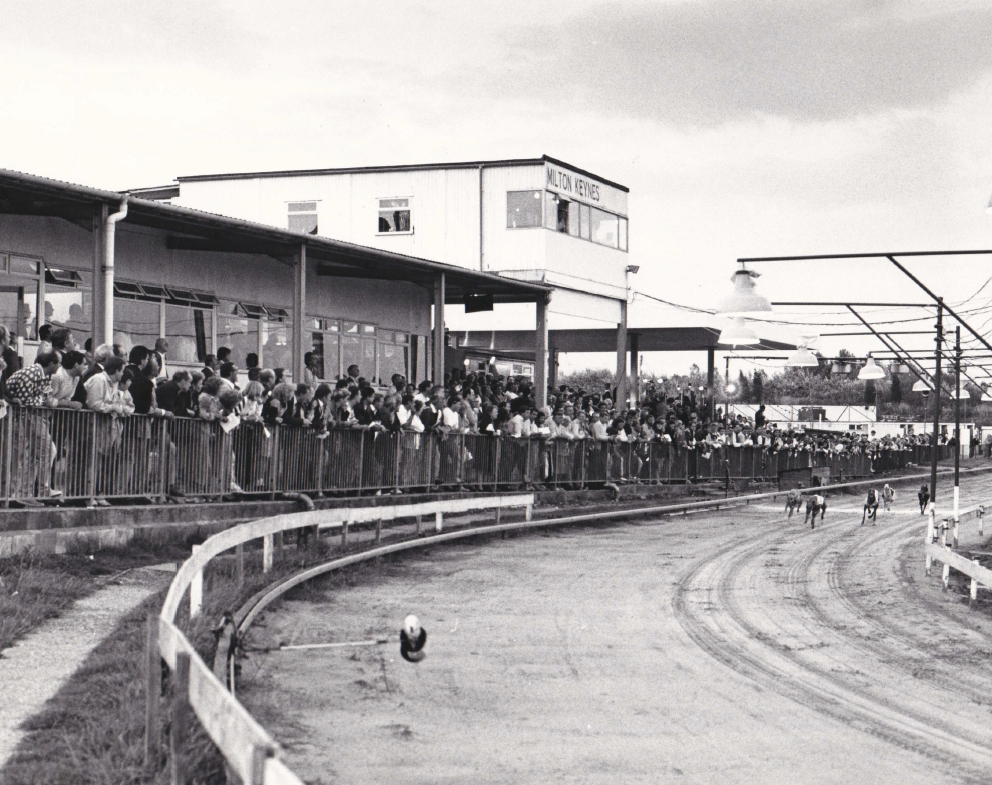
- The stadium in circa 1975
- Location: Ashland, Milton Keynes
- Surface: Sand

Construction
- Opened: 25 July 1963
- Closed: 26 December 2005

Milton Keynes Greyhound Stadium was a greyhound racing and speedway stadium, in Milton Keynes located on the Groveway in Ashland.

== Origins & opening ==
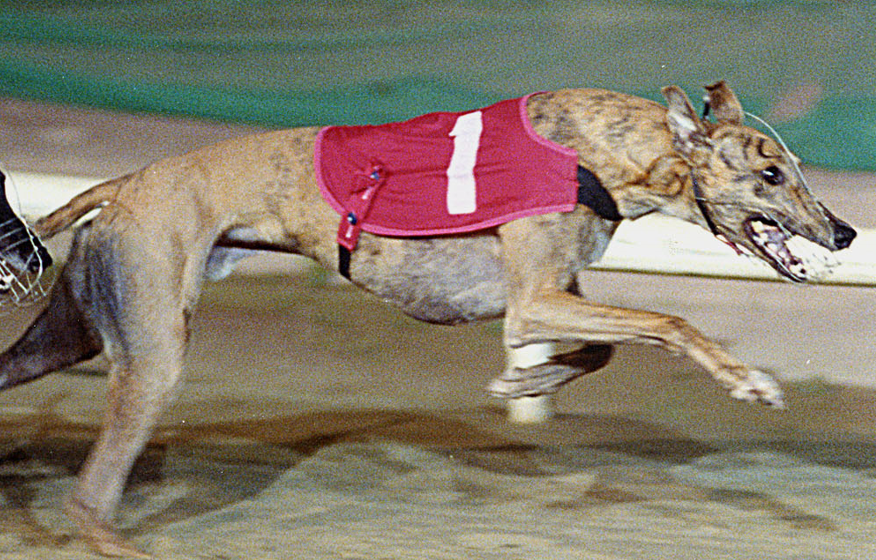
El Ronan the 2002 Milton Keynes derby winner

The stadium opened as an independent track on 25 July 1963 and was called the Groveway Greyhound Stadium. The name Groveway came from the Grove Way road that passed the stadium on the north side joining the small town of Bletchley with the village of Simpson. The track had been built four years before the birth of a large new town called Milton Keynes (named after one of the 15 villages) in a planned 34 square mile area. Milton Keynes proceeded to grow at speed eventually becoming the size of city.

== History ==
Racing took place on Tuesday at 8pm and Saturday at 7.30pm and the circumference was 410 yards with an 'Inside Sumner' hare. Facilities included licensed bars, a refreshment bar and a children's playground. The promoter and Racing Manager Robert Beckett organised annual events called the Groveway Autumn Cup, Groveway Derby and Bletchley Trophy. trial day was a Sunday and six bookmakers were in attendance and race distances were 305, 440, 460, 525, 745, 900 & 965 yards.

In 1972 the National Greyhound Racing Club and National Greyhound Racing Society amalgamated to form one controlling body called the National Greyhound Racing Club Ltd. Groveway Stadium joined the NGRC banner and the NGRC also relaxed the rule that previously did not allow any NGRC owner or trainer to attend an independent track.

In the early seventies housing estates called Bean Hill and Netherfield were built to the north of the track and the Mount Farm Industrial Estate was constructed to the south. Reg Young the former breeder and owner of 1970 English Greyhound Derby champion John Silver joined the track as a trainer. The track also changed its name to Bletchley with the 1972 Bletchley Derby now an official race in terms of being affiliated to the NGRC. In 1974 Stage Box won the BBC Television Trophy for Natalie Savva and one year later Gwen Lynds won the Greyhound Derby with Tartan Khan, the same year that Reg Young's Silver Sceptre won the Cesarewitch.

In 1980 the A5 road was built nearby and Robert Beckett retired. The track reverted to independent status for a short spell but trainer Reg Young stepped in to become the new promoter with the track rejoining the NGRC under the permit scheme. The stadium was now known as Milton Keynes instead of Bletchley and Robert Beckett's son David took over the Racing Manager's position.

Natalie Savva's Special Account won the Scottish Greyhound Derby and trainers Theo Mentzis, Jack Coker, Peggy Cope, Ron Bicknell, Angela McClurg, Mel Bass and Derek Law all secured major open race success for Milton Keynes in the following years. Reg Young retired in 1987 but returned as General Manager in the early nineties followed by Dan McCormick before the track was sold by Milton Keynes Stadium Ltd to the BS Group who also owned the Eastville track in Bristol.

David Beckett died in 1996 and Eastville closed but Toms The Best won the 1998 English Greyhound Derby. In 1999 the BS Group bought the Milton Keynes Bowl and Pachinko as the company went into the gaming business. The company then purchased Reading Stadium from Allied Presentations in 2002 and Bill Johnson became Racing Manager with Sue Conway as GM in 1998. In 2004 the BS Group were renamed to Gaming International and received criticism for the failure to re-open Bristol.

== Closure ==
Plans to rebuild Milton Keynes Stadium at the Elfield Park site near the Milton Keynes Bowl were unveiled in 1998 and early 2005 The plans failed to materialise and the Greyhound Stadium closed down on Boxing Day 2005, it became derelict and then suffered major fire which resulted in the demolition of the site before a housing estate replaced it in 2014. The position of the stadium would have been underneath the current road called Wetheringsett in Ashland.

== Competitions ==
=== Milton Keynes Derby ===
Year	Winner	Breeding	Trainer	Time	SP
1972	Easy Investment	Brandon Jungle – Fallen Ribocco	George Curtis (Brighton)	29.18	1-1f
1973	Tims Blunder		Reg Webb (Bletchley)	29.32	3-1
1974	Carriglawn Pet		Sid Corley (Bletchley)		
1975	Weston Oak	Monalee Champion – Trojan Silver	Reg Young (Bletchley)		
1976	Westmead Satin	Westmead Lane – Hacksaw	Natalie Savva (Bletchley)	38.70	
1977	Fairbourn Paddy	Westmead County – Prate Box	E Dilley (Bletchley)	38.74	8-1
1978	Rail Fred	Rail Ship – Crooked Rampart	Sid Corley (Bletchley)	38.89	
1979	Kilmagoura Mist	Yanka Boy - Kilmagoura Fair	Tom Johnston Jr. (Wembley)		
1998	I'm Frankie	Herbie Lambug – Fast Flo	Mick Puzey (Walthamstow)	26.77	9-4
1999	Black Head	Barefoot Chief – Fort Flax Lady	Arthur Hitch (Wimbledon)	27.97	7-2
2000	Glowing Wave	Frightful Flash – Country Star	Charlie Lister (Private)	26.85	8-1
2001	Whitefort Jim	Larkhill Jo – Whitefort Sal	Cheryl Miller (Sittingbourne)	26.60	11-4
2002	El Ronan	Staplers Jo – Freds Flame	Charlie Lister (Private)	26.68	5-2f
2003	Setemup Joe	Staplers Jo – Wise Minnie	Tom Foster (Wimbledon)	26.82	6-4
2004	Ardera Cross	Droopys Kewell – Tenthill Flash	Maxine Locke (Wimbledon)	26.44	7-2
2005	Wheres Yer Man	Droopys Woods – Dower Beauty	Peter Rich (Romford)	27.02	11-10f

== Track records ==
Distance metres	Greyhound	Time	Date	Notes
245	Westfield Earl	14.76	24.08.1978	
245	Tims Crow	14.73	23.10.2003	
430	Super System	26.31	26.04.1975	
440	Fortune King	26.72	25.09.1983	
440	Siroco	26.56	22.03.1984	
440	Dawlish Chance	26.55	11.10.1986	
440	Broken Quest	26.28	21.04.1998	
620	Countville	39.05	26.07.1975	
620	Weston Oak	38.19	29.04.1976	
620	Frame Evelyn 3	8.19	12.04.1984	
620	Glenowen Queen	38.11	08.08.1985	Autumn Cup semi-final
620	Jerpoint Diamond	38.08	19.01.1989	
620	Cushie Amazing	37.96	31.01.1998	
620	Farloe Bonus	37.86	22.08.1998	Summer Cup
805	Silver Sceptre	51.84	29.03.1975	
815	Tartan Sarah	51.84	19.04.1984	
815	Grange Glen Sam	51.73	08.09.1984	
815	Spenwood Gem	51.22	24.04.1999	
995	Souda Bay	64.79	27.02.1997	
995	Gift of Gold	64.10	19.09.2000	
440 H	Springwell Boost	27.15	21.10.1997	
620 H	El Tenor	39.31	31.08.1998	
