= City Ground (Cambridge) =

Football stadium and greyhound racing track in England

- Interactive map of City Ground
- Full name: City Ground
- Coordinates: 52°12′59″N 0°7′21″E
- Capacity: 2,300 (500 seated)

Construction
- Built: 1922
- Opened: 1922
- Closed: 2013

Tenant
- Cambridge City

The City Ground (also known as Milton Road) was a football stadium and greyhound racing track in Cambridge, England. It was the home of Cambridge City Football Club.

== History ==
The City Ground was Cambridge City's home ground from 29 April 1922 until 27 April 2013. It was located in the Chesterton area of the city, approximately 1 km north of the city centre.

In the first game at the ground, Cambridge Town, as the club were then named, played Merton Town. The ground was one of the largest outside the Football League and was estimated to have a capacity in excess of 20,000, although the highest recorded attendance was 12,058 against Leytonstone in 1961. From the late 1960s the ground was used for greyhound racing, and crowds were often higher than for football matches. However, dwindling gates and crippling debts led to part of the site being sold for development in 1985. The ground was demolished and a much smaller but functional ground was built in its place, approximately a pitch's length north-west of the former ground, with the remainder of the site being developed for offices. The club had a bar and lounge which was open on match days and available for hire to the general public.

The ground itself had a capacity of 2,300. The Main Stand, together with its extension (built to house the Cambridgeshire FA) seated approximately 500 people. Opposite the Main Stand, a narrow terrace provided covered terracing for approximately 220 supporters. The middle section was popularly, though not officially, known as "The Shed" and attracted City's more vocal supporters. At each end of the ground, the School End and the Westbrook End were narrow and had no cover or formal terracing.

The ground, which was sold by a previous board of directors for £2.2 million despite professional estimates of the site's value being around £12 million. The landlords, Isle of Man company Ross River, which is linked to former City Director and property developer Brian York, gave City a lease to stay at Milton Road only until 31 May 2007, but the club fought this. After several months a High Court ruling stated that "the club is entitled to rescind the [sale of the land] - having been induced to make it by a fraudulent misrepresentation for which Ross River are responsible". The consequence of this is that City were able to stay at the City Ground until 2013 and would share in 50% of future profits from development of the site.

In April 2008 the City Ground failed an FA ground inspection. As a consequence Cambridge City were automatically demoted from the Conference South to the Southern League Premier Division, despite the club appealing against the decision.

The club were involved in negotiations to move to a new Community Stadium on the edge of the city, which they could potentially share with local football rivals Cambridge United and/or Cambridge RUFC, but in late 2012, it was announced that club president Len Satchell had purchased 35 acres of land in Sawston, with a view to building a 3,000 capacity stadium, along with community facilities for Sawston and the surrounding villages. As of April 2013, this project was going through public consultation.

A three-year groundshare with Newmarket Town was arranged so that Cambridge City would play their home games at Newmarket's Cricket Field Road for the 2010–2011 season, but an extension to the lease at Milton Road meant that the move never took place. Once confirmation had been made City would need to vacate Milton Road at the end of the 2012–13 season, the club agreed a two-year ground share with Histon from the start of the 2013–14 season.

Cambridge City reached the First Round proper of the 2012–13 FA Cup, and the City Ground hosted its first televised match. ESPN screened a 0–0 draw against League One side Milton Keynes Dons.

On 27 April 2013, with City having missed the playoffs of the Southern League Premier Division, they played their last match at Milton Road against Redditch United. The day was marked with various events, including over thirty former players being in attendance at the game. A crowd of 814 saw Adrian Cambridge score the only goal of the game to ensure City ended their stay at Milton Road with a win.

== Greyhound racing ==
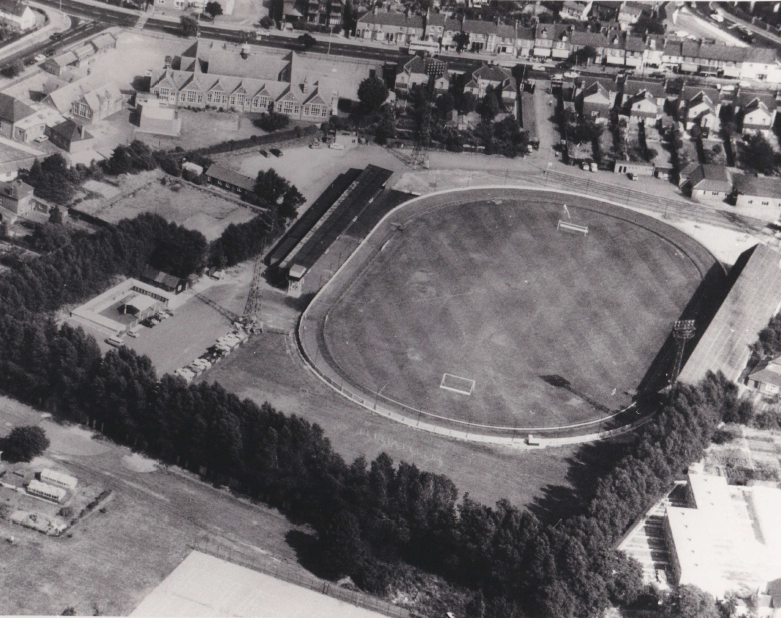
Greyhound track surrounding the City Ground pitch in Cambridge c.1970

Greyhound racing started at Milton Road on 6 October 1968 after a track was constructed around the football pitch. The racing was independent (unaffiliated to a governing body) and was known as the Cambridge City Greyhound Stadium. The first racing took place on Wednesday and Saturday evenings at 7.30pm on a circumference of 400 yards with a 'McGee Outside' hare. Distances were 260, 460 and 660 yards on an all-grass track.

In 1974 the management decided to become National Greyhound Racing Club (NGRC) affiliated but the association only lasted five months before promoter Laurie Boost said increased costs had forced the track to revert to its independent status. In 1978 the decision was made to race under NGRC rules for a second time which resulted in a considerable sequence of successes for the track that had only just switched from being an independent. Racing took place every Monday, Wednesday and Saturday evening with trials sessions held on Thursday afternoons. The switch to NGRC rules resulted in the track being resurfaced and restaurant facilities being made available to the public. A strong group of trainers became attached to the track and the first race under the new rules was on 24 November with the Racing Manager being J Foster.

The trainers arriving included Pat Mullins, the 1978 English Greyhound Derby winning trainer, and he brought success to Cambridge when he won the Scottish Greyhound Derby with Greenville Boy in 1979. Lacca Champion nearly achieved a remarkable double when finishing runner up in the 1979 Greyhound Derby. Also in 1979 a newcomer called Sport Promoter, reared by Pat and his wife Linda Mullins, broke the track record over 400m at Cambridge in his first race and went on to win the Romford Puppy Cup and Juvenile. The George Morrow-trained Northway Point won the Scurry Gold Cup, and highly respected trainer Joe Cobbold joined the training ranks.

Sport Promoter was awarded the title of Greyhound of the Year and trainer Pat Mullins also became the Trainer of the Year in 1980 but in 1981 Pat Mullins died and his wife Linda took over the kennels. Joe Cobbold claimed the 1981 Trainer of the Year and the latest training recruit Natalie Savva then went on to win the Puppy Derby with Special Account. The track was recognised by the industry after receiving Bookmakers Afternoon Greyhound Service (BAGS) contract in 1982. The golden period came to an end in 1983 when Cambridge had its NGRC licence cancelled and reverted once again to independent status but this forced the leading trainers to leave.

In 1984, planning permission was given for a £10 million redevelopment scheme for the ground. The pitch, greyhound track and stands were demolished and replaced by a three-storey block of research and development buildings with an underground car park, and the football pitch was moved north-west. The last meeting was held on 14 April 1984. and the last football match was a 2–2 draw between Cambridge City and Dunstable on Wednesday 25th April 1984 before a crowd of 179.
