= 1932 UK & Ireland Greyhound Racing Year =

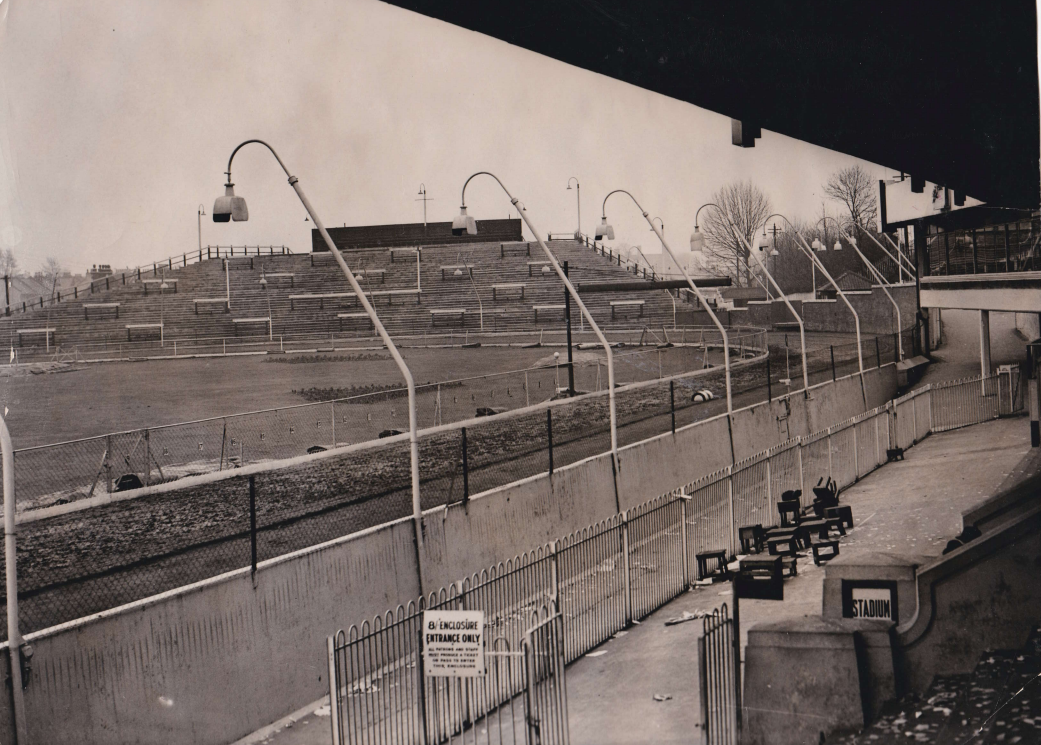
- Catford Stadium opened during 1932

The 1932 UK & Ireland Greyhound Racing Year was the seventh year of greyhound racing in the United Kingdom and the sixth year of greyhound racing in Ireland. The total annual attendance across the country for 1932 topped 20 million, increasing to 20,178,260 from 17,906,917 (in 1931), a sixth consecutive annual increase.

== Summary ==
At least 43 new tracks opened during 1932. It is believed that there were 187 tracks (including independent tracks) in operation by December 1932 as the industry continued to experience phenomenal growth. The breakdown consisted of 50 tracks affiliated to the National Greyhound Racing Society and 14 tracks affiliated the rival organisation the British Greyhound Tracks Control Society (BGTCS) leaving 123 unaffiliated tracks.

== Tracks ==
The London area was served by four new tracks Crayford & Bexleyheath Stadium, Hackney Wick Stadium, Catford Stadium and Brixton Greyhound Stadium. Catford held an inaugural meeting on Saturday 30 July where the crowd witnessed a seven card race of events comprising four or five runners. Mick the Miller was paraded around the track prior to the fourth race. Edinburgh welcomed two new tracks, Stenhouse Stadium and Marine Gardens and Shawfield Stadium opened in Glasgow.

Plans were drawn up by the Blackpool Greyhound Syndicate, owners of Blackpool and Hanley, to put a track around the football and rugby pitch at Craven Park, Barrow-in-Furness. The syndicate sold it as an ambitious project that would give the Furness public its first taste of a sport that has become tremendously popular since its inauguration five years previously. Walter Aland, the managing director, was negotiating for the construction of greyhound tracks on football grounds in several parts of the country and was confident that it was possible to run a greyhound meeting on a football ground less than an hour after a match had finished. He said "Negotiations have already been completed for the introduction of greyhound racing to Barrow, Walsall and Coventry, and by June we hope to have tracks on 12 grounds, four of which will be in Lancashire". An application was to be made for a licence and facilities would be provided for private owners to enter dogs in races. Mr G Lumsden, was appointed general manager of all tracks under the control of the syndicate. The attempts to set up a track at Barrow met stiff opposition after being condemned by the clergymen claiming the plans as being an encouragement to gambling.

== News ==
At Eastville Stadium the totalisator system was introduced at the same time that Brighton & Hove Greyhound Stadium installed their hand-operated tote, but within six months both tracks would suffer due to the government ban on tote betting. The government Cabinet committee conducted a report into the totalisator on greyhound racing tracks. The committee chaired by Sir J. Gilmour and using an interim report from the Royal Commission on Lotteries and Betting recommended that the government should adopt a policy on totalisator betting at greyhound tracks. The royal commission findings highlighted the spread of organised facilities for betting and gambling and recommended that totalisator betting on the greyhound trade should come to an end as soon as possible. A recent court case (Shuttleworth v Leeds Greyhound Racing Association) was quoted whereby Leeds actions constituted an offence because of tote deductions from the winnings. The committee agreed that it should become illegal, despite the fact that horse racing could continue with the use of totalisator systems. In a similar case in Scotland (Strathern v Scottish Greyhound Racing Company) the court ruled that there was no offence committed against the Betting Houses Act 1853.

The owner of Charlton Stadium (Thomas Murphy) died and had a memorial of two life sized greyhounds built on his grave in Charlton cemetery. Trainer Jock Hutchinson left Catford to be replaced by 1931 English Greyhound Derby winning owner Hammond. The Greyhound Express was launched giving readers the inside information to racing in London but it became so popular that the paper grew in size and was distributed throughout the country for the next 40 years.

== Competitions ==
The hurdler Long Hop won the Grand National, Empire Stadium Hurdles and Wimbledon Challenge Trophy in the process of securing 16 consecutive wins. Future Cutlet returned to track racing and was expected to take over the mantle of leading greyhound following the retirement of Mick the Miller. The brindle won the Wembley Spring Cup but was quoted at 100-1 for the 1932 English Greyhound Derby which led to a surge in ante-post bets that left the bookmakers with huge liabilities on the dog. Following his Derby defeat Future Cutlet bounced back to his best winning a second successive Cesarewitch, a competition that included Seldom Led. Future Cutlet set a new world record of 33.78 sec in his semi-final.

The new Derby champion Wild Woolley switched from Jack Rimmer to Jimmy Campbell at Belle Vue Stadium and whilst winning the Northern Flat later that year he set a world record of 28.49 for 500 yards in the process. Jack's brother Jimmy Rimmer set a trainer's record of 504 winners in one year whilst attached to the Greenfield Stadium, Bradford.

The Laurels in September, drew a strong field with the final including Seldom Led and Scurry Gold Cup champion Experts Boast and a new star called Beef Cutlet (half-brother to Future Cutlet and full brother to Queen of the Suir). He had reached the last four of the Coursing National Breeders' Stakes at Powerstown in 1932 and was purchased from Mr J.A. Byrne, by Sir Herbert Merrett, chairman of Cardiff City Football Club as a present for his daughter, Miss Joan Merritt. He made his debut on the track at Cardiff Arms Park, winning the Glamorgan Gold Cup and setting a new track record, in 28.41sec. His Waterhall kennels trainer John Hegarty would later become a Racing Manager. In only his seventh track race he won the Laurels, breaking the track record and setting a new world record for 500 yards recording 28.47. Derby finalists performed well throughout the year and Fret Not trained by Leslie Reynolds won the St Leger from 4-9 favourite Curious Mickey. The Oaks went to Queen of the Suir, the sister of the two Cutlets.

== Ireland ==
Mullingar Greyhound Stadium opened on 16 August, just two weeks before a calendar of classic events was distributed by the Irish Coursing Club for the first time, on 2 August, it read as follows; St Leger at Celtic Park, National Sprint at Dunmore Park, National Derby at Shelbourne Park, Grand National at Harold's Cross Stadium and the Oaks at Clonmel Greyhound Stadium. Harold's Cross were left angered by the decision to run the National Derby at Shelbourne because they had run the unofficial National Derby since 1928. Creamery Border was purchased by butter maker Michael Collins as a puppy, together with his litter brother Sly Mover, for £30, a large sum taking into account the depression. The blue dog by Border Line out of Cook had suffered from distemper at 12 months old but was cured by Arthur 'Doc' Callanan. Six months later he made his debut coursing in the Cork Cup in which he was defeated in the semi-final by coursing legend White Sandills. At two years old he contested the Kingdom Cup at Ballybeggan Park, Tralee, a thirty-two-dog stake and went through the event undefeated which gained the attention of the London owners and syndicates.

== Tracks opened ==
Date	Stadium/Track	Location	Ref
12 January	Owlerton Stadium	Sheffield	
9 March	Poolstock Stadium	Wigan	
11 March	Forthbank Park	Stirling	
15 March	Audenshaw Greyhound Racing and Sports Ground	Manchester	
25 March	Yarmouth Greyhound Track	Yarmouth	
26 March	Willenhall Greyhound Stadium	Willenhall	
28 March	Crayford & Bexleyheath Stadium	London	
? March	Hawthorn Greyhound Track	Pontypridd	
8 April	Hackney Wick Stadium	London	
23 April	White City, Swansea Greyhound Track	Swansea	
5 May	Preston Greyhound Stadium	Preston	
20 May	New Writtle Street Stadium	Chelmsford	
21 May	Gosforth Greyhound Stadium	Newcastle	
25 May	York Street	Boston	
18 June	Athletic Grounds, Rochdale	Rochdale	
25 June	Aberdeen Regent Park Greyhound Stadium	Aberdeen	
25 June	Stenhouse Stadium	Edinburgh	
1 July	Galway Sportsgrounds	Galway	
2 July	Marine Gardens	Edinburgh	
16 July	Brockville Park	Falkirk	
19 July	Cobridge Stadium	Stoke-on-Trent	
22 July	Clyde Valley Greyhound Track	Motherwell	
29 July	Brandywell Stadium	Derry	
30 July	The Firs Stadium	Norwich	
30 July	Catford Stadium	London	
30 July	Shirebrook Stadium	Shirebrook	
5 August	City Stadium	Bradford	
16 August	Mullingar Greyhound Stadium	Mullingar	
19 August	Diamond Stadium	Falkirk	
20 August	White City Stadium	Liverpool	
? August	Craven Park	Barrow-in-Furness	
3 September	Jenner Park Stadium	Barry	
10 September	Brixton Greyhound Stadium	London	
6 October	Boundary Park Stadium	Norwich	
7 October	Boghead Park	Dumbarton	
14 October	Love Street Stadium	Paisley	
28 October	Welling Stadium	London	
5 November	St Helens Greyhound Racing and Sports Stadium	St Helens	
9 November	Dens Park	Dundee	
14 November	Shawfield Stadium	Glasgow	
17 November	Somerton Park	Newport	
12 December	Parkside Sports Stadium	Leeds	
23 December	Hazel Grove Greyhound Stadium	Stockport	
26 December	Athletic Ground	Aberdare	
26 December	Dover and District Greyhound Stadium	Dover	
30 December	Townhead Greyhound Track	Irvine	

== Roll of honour ==
Major Winners
Award	Name of Winner
1932 English Greyhound Derby	Wild Woolley
1932 Irish Greyhound Derby	Guideless Joe
1932 Scottish Greyhound Derby	Laverock
1932 Welsh Greyhound Derby	Reel Tom

== Principal UK races ==
Grand National, White City (Jun 4, 525y h, £300)
Pos	Name of Greyhound	Trainer	SP	Time (sec)	Trap
1st	Long Hop	Ian McCorkindale	3-1	31.44	4
2nd	Wisbech General	Jock Hutchinson	25-1	31.68	2
3rd	Bass Horn	Jack Rimmer	5-2	31.69	3
4th	Sammys Adventure	Stanley Biss	10-11f		1

Cesarewitch, West Ham (Jul 16, 600y, £700)
Pos	Name of Greyhound	Trainer	SP	Time	Trap
1st	Future Cutlet	Sidney Probert	2-7f	34.11	3
2nd	Bella	Stanley Biss	11-2	34.21	2
3rd	Robins Reward	Perry	60-1	34.45	5
u	Seldom Led	Jerry Hannafin	20-1		1
u	Elsell	Jack Rimmer	100-6		4
u	Castleve	Arthur Doc Callanan	60-1		6

Scottish Greyhound Derby, Carntyne (Jul 23, 525y, £150)
Pos	Name of Greyhound	Trainer	SP	Time	Trap
1st	Laverock	WC Glasgow	8-1	30.10	3
2nd	Locknavon	WC Glasgow	10-1	30.34	2
3rd	Man Friday	Carntyne	5-4jf	30.37	6
u	Goldberry	Carntyne	20-1		1
u	Hidden Bottle	Powderhall	5-4jf		4
u	Allergarth	Carntyne	25-1		5

Welsh Derby, White City (Cardiff) (Aug 6, 525y, £112)
Pos	Name of Greyhound	Trainer	SP	Time	Trap
1st	Reel Tom	Billy Quinn	5-1	29.87	2
2nd	Dee Swift	Mrs D Firman	5-1	29.95	1
3rd	Derek F	Mrs D Firman	4-9f	29.96	3
4th	Garryowen Boy				4

Scurry Gold Cup, Clapton (Aug 6, 400y, £600)
Pos	Name of Greyhound	Trainer	SP	Time	Trap
1st	Experts Boast	Sid Jennings	4-6f	23.61	1
2nd	King of Thomond	Paddy McEllistrim	9-1	23.85	5
3rd	Barrack Bridge	Arthur Doc Callanan	8-1	24.09	4
u	Barmecide	Private	10-1		2
u	Winning Bound	Jack Rimmer	7-2		3
u	Derrick	Sidney Orton	33-1		6

Laurels, Wimbledon (Sep 2, 500y, £600)
Pos	Name of Greyhound	Trainer	SP	Time	Trap
1st	Beef Cutlet	John Hegarty	4-6f	28.47+	4
2nd	Derek F	Mrs D Firman	10-1	28.85	3
3rd	Toftwood Misery	Sidney Orton	20-1	28.93	5
u	Experts Boast	Sid Jennings	6-1		1
u	King of Thomond	Paddy McEllistrim	3-1		2
u	Seldom Led	Jerry Hannafin	100-6		6

St Leger, Wembley (Oct 8, 700y, £750)
Pos	Name of Greyhound	Trainer	SP	Time	Trap
1st	Fret Not	Leslie Reynolds	7-2	41.35	2
2nd	Earl Whitehall	Thomas Cudmore	6-1	41.51	1
3rd	Curious Mickey	Ronnie Melville	4-9f	41.59	3
4th	Camper	Johnny Bullock	10-1		4

Oaks, White City (Oct 22, 525y, £300)
Pos	Name of Greyhound	Trainer	SP	Time	Trap
1st	Queen of the Suir	Stanley Biss	9-4	30.89	2
2nd	Kitty True	Sidney Orton	3-1	30.97	5
3rd	Burnouse	Dal Hawkesley	10-1	30.98	1
u	Bella	Stanley Biss	6-4f		3
u	Dessino	Ronnie Melville	100-6		4
u	Diabolo	Sidney Probert	100-6		6

== Key ==
U = unplaced
0.08 = 1 length + = Track record
