= Irish Coursing Club =

Irish amateur sporting and cultural organisation

- Formation: 1916
- Type: Sports Association
- Purpose: The management and promotion of Irish hare coursing
- Headquarters: Davis Road, Clonmel, County Tipperary
- Region served: Worldwide
- Official language: English
- Staff: Limited full-time staff
- Website: irishcoursingclub.ie

The Irish Coursing Club (ICC) is the national association for hare coursing in Ireland. Founded in 1916, it consists of 89 affiliated clubs on the Island of Ireland and acts as the official authority for the Irish variety of the sport. It solely controlled and administrated Greyhound racing in Ireland until the creation of the Irish Greyhound Board in 1958, however it still continues to do so in Northern Ireland.

== National Meetings ==
The association holds two national meets, the National Meeting at the Clonmel Greyhound Stadium in County Tipperary in February, being the most important event in the coursing calendar, attracting 10,000 spectators, and claimed by its organisers to be worth up to €16 million for the local economy, and the Irish Cup at the County Limerick Coursing Club a few weeks afterwards.

== Conservation ==
A study in 2010 by Dr Neil Reid at Queen's University Belfast found that the density of hares in ICC preserves was eighteen times higher than in the wild in Ireland. It is claimed by the ICC that without regulated coursing there would be an increase of unregulated illegal hunting.

In July 2019, Rabbit haemorrhagic disease (RHD2), a highly contagious disease nicknamed 'rabbit foot and mouth' which is fatal to Leporidae (rabbits and hares), was discovered in wild hares in County Clare, County Wexford and County Wicklow. As a result, the Department of Culture, Heritage and the Gaeltacht suspended capture and tagging licences issued to the ICC and affiliated clubs. RHD2 was found in hares in the counties of Clare, Cork, Dublin, Kildare, Leitrim, Meath, Wexford and Wicklow. In August 2019, restrictions were lifted in areas outside of 25 km radius prohibited zones surrounding discovery locations which was welcomed by the club.

== Rules ==
The rules and regulations appertaining to the Irish Coursing Club are stringent, with 178 sections in 9 parts, this is in addition to Acts introduced by the Law of the Republic of Ireland.

Every greyhound bred in Ireland is required to have an Irish identity card and requires microchipping. The vast majority of greyhounds bred are either sold to owners within Greyhound racing in the United Kingdom or race in Greyhound racing in Ireland. The much smaller majority remain within coursing. The Greyhound Board of Great Britain do not allow registered owners to compete in coursing.
