= Cesarewitch =

Cesarewitch may refer to:

- Cesarewitch Handicap, a horse racing competition held in Great Britain
- Cesarewitch (English greyhound race), a greyhound racing competition held in England
- Cesarewitch (Irish greyhound race), a greyhound racing competition held in Ireland

== See also ==
- Tsesarevich (disambiguation)
