= Cox Cup =

Former Irish greyhound racing competition

- Location: Newbridge Greyhound Stadium
- Inaugurated: 1964
- Final run: 2018

Race information
- Distance: 550 yards
- Surface: Sand

The Cox Cup was a greyhound racing competition held annually at Newbridge Greyhound Stadium in Cornelscourt, Newbridge, County Kildare, Ireland. It was inaugurated in 1972 and was a prestigious competition in the Irish racing greyhound racing calendar. The last running of the event was in 2018.

== Venues and distances ==
- 1964–1996 (Newbridge 525y)
- 1997–present (Newbridge 550y)
- 2016-2017 (not held)

== Past winners ==
Year	Winner	Breeding	Trainer	Time	SP	Notes
1964	Edenberry Chieftain	Knockhill Chieftain – Edenberry Princess	J B O'Donoghue	30.39		
1965	Olivers Leader	Prairie Flash – Olives Lover	H King	30.23		
1972	Ashley Park	Local Interest – Magnetic Star	Paddy Keane	29.56		
1973	Pearl Ring	Faithful Silver - Pavella	Liam Cullen	29.56		
1974	Nelsons Belle	Nelson Pillar – Society Belle		29.64		
1975	Newpark Twilight	Moordyke Spot – Some Class	B Matthews	29.72		
1976	Stop It	Broadford Boy – Beaded Jill	M Drennan	29.26		
1977	Master Kim	Scintillas Gem – Kilcarrig Flash	Paddy Barry	29.51		
1978	Point Duty	Here Sonny – Special Tan	Francie Murray	30.02		
1979	Blushing Spy	Monalee Expert – Smart Spy	A Metcalfe	29.78		
1980	Brindle Choice	Ritas Choice – Nelson Blast	P & D Broughall	29.98		
1981	Mistress Post	Minnesota Miller – Post Mistress	G Gray	29.82		
1982	Cool Countess	Some Skinomage – Another Flame	J Franklin	29.30		
1983	Celbridge Rose	Liberty Lad – Fleadh Style	Mrs E McBride	29.28		
1984	Wise Band	Yellow Band – Wyse Choice	Francie Murray	29.20		
1985	Cast No Stones	Lax Law – Morning Frolics	A Comerford	29.16		
1986	Yellow Emperor	Moral Support - Damthelie	A Comerford	29.45		
1987	Dennys Tack	Yellow Band – Rose Wilder	Francie Murray	29.23		
1988	Amagh Bar	Cronins Bar – Thoor Ballylee	Gerry Duffin	29.18		
1989	Borris Venture	Manorville Sand – Black Contract	J Muldowney	29.40		
1990	Loum Lord	Blue Baron - Puddles	T Fahy	29.32		
1991	Ardfert Mick	Ardfert Sean – Boher Rita	Matt O'Donnell	29.00		
1992	Lodgefield Gold	Curryhills Gara – Break Free		28.90		
1993	Kenmare Gem	Castleyons Gem – Kenmare Boy	Matt O'Donnell	28.90		
1994	Valais Express	Daleys Gold – Carrick Express	Mary Delmer	28.96		
1995	Love Another	Greenpark Fox – Little Angeline	Denis Lennon	28.92		
1996	Summerhill King	Coalbrook Tiger- Woodlawn Mist		28.96		
1997	Sir Grand	Flashy Sir – Always Grand	Alan Green	29.98		
1998	Sineads Slaney	Slaneyside Hare – Pearls Girl	Frances O'Donnell	30.20		
1999	Everton Hero	Slaneyside Hare – Summer Choice	Thomas Harte	30.10		
2000	Lemon Sash	Ready About – Lemon Miss	Denny Lennon	30.12	3-1	
2001	Word Of God	Vintage Prince- Batties Spirit	Frances O'Donnell	30.09	5-1	
2002	Flashing Moment	Frisby Flashing – Clonakenny Lace	Jerry Melia	30.06	7-4f	
2003	Simply Vintage	Vintage Prince – Simply Free	Reggie Roberts	30.08	1-1f	
2004	Top Boe	Top Honcho – Next Deal	Seamus Graham	29.89	4-9f	
2005	Disguised	Larkhill Jo – Newbridge Girl	Reggie Roberts	29.96	7-4f	
2006	Droopys Electric	Droopys Agassi – Droopys Jolie	Pat Buckley	30.05	1-1f	
2007	Tyrur Lee	Brett Lee – Tyrur Dee	Paul Hennessy	29.96	2-1	
2008	Broadacres Turbo	Top Honcho – Riverside Bella	Graham Holland	30.01	4-1	
2009	We Paint Houses	Brett Lee – Embassy Lane	Seamus Graham	30.08	9-4	
2011	Tyrur Bucko	Tyrur Ted – Tyrur Lisa	Conor Fahy	29.51	7-2	Track record
2012	Quail Hollow	Royal Impact – Girl With Guitar	Francie Murray	29.82	6-4f	
2013	Captain Scolari	Droopys Scolari – Bandicoot Spice	Gerry Holian	29.82	4-1	
2014	Redwood Mick	Head Bound – Moynevilla Babe	Anna Gleeson	29.70	1-3f	
2015	Black Hawkeye	Westmead Hawk – Silent Bargain	Jimmy Melia	30.15	5-2	
2018	Kylehill Strauss	Tullymurry Act - Kylehill Eugenie	Raymond Dowling	30.41	3-1	
