= 1983 Irish Greyhound Derby =

- Venue: Shelbourne Park
- Location: Dublin
- End date: 31 July
- Total prize money: £25,000 (winner)

The 1983 Irish Greyhound Derby took place during June and July with the final being held at Shelbourne Park in Dublin on 31 July 1983.

The winner Belvedere Bran won £25,000 and was trained by Dermot O'Sullivan, owned by Cornelius 'Con' O'Sullivan and bred by Thomas McSherry. The competition was sponsored by Carrolls.

== Final result ==
At Shelbourne, 31 July (over 525 yards):

Position	Winner	Breeding	Trap	SP	Time	Trainer
1st	Belvedere Bran	Brave Bran - Knock Out	3	9-2	29.65	Dermot O'Sullivan
2nd	Brideview Sailor	Shamrock Sailor - Blonde Exile	2	12-1	29.68	Ger McKenna
3rd	Quick Suzy	Shamrock Sailor - Big Deposit	1	7-4jf	29.70	Colm McGrath
4th	Canal Road	London Spec - Fly Dolly	4	14-1	29.82	Jerry Fisher
5th	Tain Mear	Sand Man - Quick Thought	5	20-1	29.91	John Nolan
6th	Captain Miller	Ivy Hall Solo - Crows First	6	7-4jf	29.93	Ger McKenna

=== Distances ===
neck, head, 1½, 1, head (lengths)

== Competition Report ==
Game Ball arrived as the favourite for the Irish Derby after his shock 1983 English Greyhound Derby; his main challengers were considered to come from the Ger McKenna team consisting of a newcomer called Count Five, Brideview Sailor and Captain Miller.

Count Five showed first with a fast 29.04 in round one and there was a shock loss for Game Ball. Game Ball lost all form when going out of the competition in the second round but Count Five and Belvedere Bran both won again. Go Winston impressed in round three when recording 29.04, equal fastest in the event so far, but a littler later on the same night a bitch called Mams Bank set a time of 29.02 and Captain Miller also won in 29.03.

In the semi-finals a shock was in store for Count Five as he was left at the start of his race in a very strong heat which saw a win for Belvedere Bran from Captain Miller, with Mams Bank knocked out after only finishing third. McKenna earned a second finalist after Brideview Sailor finished runner-up to Quick Suzy in heat two and English challenger Canal Road ended the semi-final proceedings by winning from Tain Mear.

A very competitive final saw Brideview Sailor out of the traps first with Quick Suzy and Belvedere Bran just behind, Quick Suzy found trouble and faded into last place. Belvedere Bran challenged Brideview Sailor and outstayed his rival to claim the victory after an exciting battle between the pair.

== See also ==
- 1983 UK & Ireland Greyhound Racing Year
