= Derry Greyhound Stadium =

Greyhound racing stadium in Northern Ireland

- Location: Brandywell Showgrounds, Lone Moor Road; Derry; Northern Ireland
- Coordinates: 54.990552°N 7.336107°W
- Owned by: Derry City and Strabane District Council
- Date opened: 29 July 1932; 19 April 2018 (new track built)
- Race type: greyhound racing

Derry Greyhound Stadium also known as the Brandywell Greyhound Track is the greyhound racing operation held at the Brandywell Showgrounds next to the new Brandywell Stadium in Northern Ireland. The track was relocated from around the football pitch to next door to it, opening in 2018. Racing takes place every Monday evening.

== History ==
Northern Irish greyhound tracks are unusual in the sport of greyhound racing within the United Kingdom because they do not fall within the jurisdiction of the Greyhound Board of Great Britain. Instead, the Bord na gCon (the Irish Greyhound Board) oversees proceedings.

The track in Derry raced for the first time on 29 July 1932 under the leadership of Hugh Duffy. The track was constructed around the Brandywell Stadium football stadium, home of Derry City.

The original track was regarded as being one of the smallest in Ireland. The Brandywell Greyhound Racing Company was responsible for ensuring that racing continued over the years, even during the period from 1971 until 1985 when the football was cancelled here due to the unrest in Northern Ireland. The greyhound racing was fortunate to experience just one short closure which took place in 1971 following the loss of 20 fixtures previously. There was a dispute between Derry FC and the greyhound management in 1968 when the weekly rent was increased from £12-6 to £20 per week.

The track hosts an Irish Greyhound Derby trial stake every year and major events have included the James Corry Marathon, Festival Derby, and Ulster 500.

== New track ==
The greyhound race track closed on Saturday 3 December 2016. The stadium was demolished, with plans announced for a new stadium and a stand-alone greyhound track. The new stand-alone greyhound track was part of the 2018 £7m development for a new state-of-the-art stadium. The facility, funded by Derry City and Strabane District Council in conjunction with the Executive Office, included the track, which was opened for trials by the Brandywell Greyhound Racing Company on 9 February 2018. Racing continues every Monday evening.

== Track records ==
New track (current)

| Yards | Greyhound | Time | Date | Notes |
|---|---|---|---|---|
| 300 | Sniper Ria | 16.40 | 28 March 2022 | |
| 500 | Quill Minstral | 27.19 | 25 October 2021 | |
| 525 | Canada Goose | 28.59 | 27 September 2021 | |
| 745 | Townsend Carol | 42.05 | 20 January 2020 | |

New track (former)

| Yards | Greyhound | Time | Date | Notes |
|---|---|---|---|---|
| 300 | Rosshill Rocket | 16.51 | 19 April 2018 | |
| 300 | Caughtbysurprise | 16.45 | 14 January 2019 | |
| 300 | Cromac Willow | 16.45 | 28 September 2020 | |
| 500 | Central Boss | 27.51 | 28 May 2018 | |
| 500 | Nemesis | 27.50 | 21 September 2020 | |
| 500 | Manalishi Chief | 27.45 | 22 June 2021 | |
| 525 | Central Boss | 28.78 | 6 August 2018 | |

Old track

| Yards | Greyhound | Time | Date | Notes |
|---|---|---|---|---|
| 300 | Currowgariff Border | 16.83 | 1950 | |
| 300 | Black Velvet | 16.55 | 1978 | |
| 300 | Bright Oliver | 16.45 | 19 October 1979 | |
| 300 | Pipers Gold | 16.43 | 22 September 1989 | |
| 300 | Drumragh Mulder | 16.51 | 8 September 2000 | |
| 300 | Cobra | 16.46 | 17 August 2009 | |
| 400 | Beefeater | 28.77 | 2002 | |
| 440 | True Record | 25.56 | 1950 | |
| 440 | Local Sweep | 25.08 | 1970 | |
| 440 | High Footstick | 25.05 | 1978 | |
| 440 | Street Cat | 24.94 | 13 July 1981 | |
| 500 | Sandy Lee | 28.20 | 1970 | |
| 500 | Drumahisky Champ | | 1978 | |
| 500 | Glackmore Island | 27.98 | 1978 | |
| 500 | Seaway Joe | 27.96 | 9 December 1983 | |
| 500 | Central Supreme | 27.85 | 24 April 1990 | |
| 500 | Tullymurry Toff | 27.85 | 16 March 2001 | |
| 500 | Kinrush | 27.84 | 12 July 2002 | |
| 500 | Cavies Cruncher | 27.78 | 31 October 2003 | |
| 500 | Eden Brett | 27.64 | 22 September 2008 | |
| 525 | Hale Farloe | 30.64 | 1950 | |
| 525 | Prisona Nuath | 29.56 | 1978 | |
| 525 | Glenroe Champ | 29.54 | 1979 | |
| 525 | Drumahisky Champ | 29.51 | 1980 | |
| 525 | Westpark City | 29.04 | 15 June 1984 | |
| 525 | Lignamonagh Bray | 28.90 | 11 July 2003 | |
| 600 | Leck Venture | 34.20 | 1980 | |
| 600 | Farloe Hall | 34.02 | 24 February 1985 | |
| 600 | Coleraine Jazz | 34.02 | 10 May 1985 | |
| 600 | Pusher Bird | 33.99 | 29 July 1988 | |
| 600 | Winners Flag | 33.92 | 23 October 1992 | |
| 600 | Homefield King | 33.92 | 2002 | |
| 600 | Elm Lass | 33.88 | 9 May 2003 | |
| 600 | Star Model | 33.79 | 24 November 2003 | |
| 720 | Atomic Rebel | 40.96 | 1 April 1948 | |
| 720 | Miss Jahousky | 40.20 | 16 August 1985 | |
| 720 | Farloe Frown | 41.01 | 16 July 2001 | |
| 720 | Farloe Tico | 40.42 | 12 June 2008 | |
| 920 | Tullys Passion | 53.96 | 31 May 2007 | |
