= 1932 English Greyhound Derby =

1932 edition of the annual English Greyhound Derby

- Wild Woolley
- Location: White City Stadium
- Start date: 9 June
- End date: 25 June
- Total prize money: £1,050 (winner)

The 1932 Greyhound Derby took place during June with the final being held on 25 June 1932 at White City Stadium. The winner Wild Woolley received a first prize of £1,050.

== Final result ==
At White City (over 525 yards):

Position	Name of Greyhound	Breeding	Trap	SP	Time	Trainer
1st	Wild Woolley	Hautley - Wild Witch	6	5-2	29.72	Jack Rimmer (White City - Manchester)
2nd	Future Cutlet	Mutton Cutlet - Wary Guide	5	8-13f	29.75	Sidney Probert (Wembley)
3rd	Fret Not	Lenin - Laughing Lady	1	10-1	30.55	Leslie Reynolds (Harringay)
4th	Disorder	Red Robin - January	3	33-1	31.11	Charlie Ashley (White City - London)
5th	Barrack Bridge	Delage II - Range	4	66-1	31.19	Arthur 'Doc' Callanan (Wembley)
6th	Dee Tern	Red Robin - Dicentra	2	20-1	31.27	W Hewitt (Belle Vue)

=== Distances ===
Neck, 10, 7, 1, 1 (lengths)
The distances between the greyhounds are in finishing order and shown in lengths. From 1927-1950 one length was equal to 0.06 of one second but race times are shown as 0.08 as per modern day calculations.

== Review ==
The leading contenders for the Derby were expected to be the trio consisting of defending champion Seldom Led, the new star of greyhound racing Future Cutlet and Manchester greyhound Wild Woolley, a 25 guinea purchase by Sam Johnson and winner of the 1931 Trafalgar Cup. The pair met in the first round where Future Cutlet continually held off a challenge by Wild Woolley and set a new track record at White City recording a time of 29.62 sec for the 525 yards course. This propelled him into favourite for the event despite the fact that he preferred a longer distance.

Future Cutlet continued to outclass the opposition during the following rounds and won his semi final in 30.03; Dee Tern took second place to seal a place in the final. The bookmakers faced significant liabilities (in excess of £50,000) if Future Cutlet won the final. Wild Woolley defeated Barrack Bridge in a time of 29.93 by 7 lengths in the second semi final and in the third semi-final the defending champion Seldom Led was eliminated going out to Fret Not and Disorder in 30.55. It was reported later that Seldom Led had been off-colour (unwell) going into the race.

Mick the Miller and the other former winners paraded before the final accompanied by the pipes and drums of the Irish Guards inf front of an attendance of 70,000. In the final Fret Not was first out of the traps closely followed by Future Cutlet who soon took the lead on the rails just in front of northern flier Wild Woolley. It was soon a two way battle between the pair along the back straight and by the third bend Wild Woolley challenged and overtook Future Cutlet and maintained this lead right up to the finish line, winning by a neck. Fret Not came in a distant third, ten lengths adrift.

== See also ==
1932 UK & Ireland Greyhound Racing Year
