= Boyne Valley Greyhound Stadium =

Defunct greyhound racing venue in Ireland

- Location: Limekiln Hill, Navan, County Meath
- Coordinates: 53°38′35.577″N 6°41′7.946″W
- Opened: 1950
- Closed: 1999

Boyne Valley Greyhound Stadium was a greyhound racing stadium on Limekiln Hill, East of the Trim Road in Navan, County Meath.

== History ==
The stadium was constructed by the Boyne Valley Greyhound Racing Co. Ltd. in early 1950. The race distances were 350, 525, 550 and 600 yards and racing was planned for Wednesday and Thursday evenings. ICC steward Frank Loughran was the first manager.

The opening night at the Boyne Valley Greyhound Stadium was on 21 June 1950. The track was opened by Senator P. Fitzsimons, Chairman of Meath Co. and by the director Johnny Cantwell. The track had a large 500 yard circuit circumference and there were seven races won by Flashlight Freddie, Just a Dog, Trial Times, Baytown Apple, Sky Goal, Few Words and Silver Abbey.

In 1960 the track first ran the Cesarewitch which gained classic status. Winners of the competition included Yanka Boy and Postal Vote before Ritas Choice broke the track record in the final in 1973. The event continued to produce significant winners including Itsachampion, Ballybeg Prim and Rahan Ship.

In 1962, a totalisator was installed and five years later a new viewing area and bar was constructed. Founding Director Johnny Cantwell died in 1974 and following his death the company passed to his sons John and William.

The track was suspended in 1983 by the Bord na gCon after a failure to pay all prize money owed, but despite this setback the track soon returned to action and the Cesarewitch remained one of Ireland's major events. Roan Hurricane achieved a double in 1995 and then Bonus Prince completed a treble in 1998.

Paddy Barry was the Manager of the Navan Track from 1984-1996.

== Closure ==
Developers bought the track in 1998 for the relatively small figure of £1 million and although the track closed in 1999 it took until 2009 for the site to be developed into a new Lidl supermarket.

== Competitions ==
- Cesarewitch

== Track records ==
Yards	Greyhound	Time	Date	Notes
350	Oagham Boreen	19.15	1 September 1954	
350	Never So Gay	19.04	9 October 1975	
350	Princes Pal	18.76	23 July 1987	National Record
525	Little Kim	29.17	18 May 1966	
525	Trip To Arran	29.10	25 September 1986	
550	Sarsfield Castle	31.20	17 October 1951	
550	Five Arrow	31.20	31 October 1956	
550	Rolling Penny	31.15	1970	
550	Murphys Arkle	30.72	2 August 1973	
550	Hold Your Coole	30.40	30 July 1987	
550	Gourmet Manor	30.38	1988	
550	Lispopple Story	30.26	29 July 1989	
600	Fleadh Music	33.42	August 1963	Cesarewitch Heats
600	Brookeville Sputnik	33.34	6 September 1963	Cesarewitch semi final
600	Butterfly Billy	33.26	1970	
600	Postal Vote	33.08	3 September 1970	
600	Ritas Choice	33.04	13 September 1973	Cesarewitch final
600	Choice Model	32.92	19 August 1982	National Record
600	Ratify	32.68	10 June 1993	Cesarewitch final
760	Ratify	43.44	15 August 1993	
850	Tiny Tolcas	48.88	23 July 1987	
