= 1983 UK & Ireland Greyhound Racing Year =

The 1983 UK & Ireland Greyhound Racing Year was the 58th year of greyhound racing in the United Kingdom and the 57th year of greyhound racing in Ireland.

== Roll of honour ==
Major Winners
Award	Name of Winner
1983 English Greyhound Derby	Im Slippy
1983 Irish Greyhound Derby	Belvedere Bran
1983 Scottish Greyhound Derby	On Spec
Greyhound Trainer of the Year	George Curtis
Greyhound of the Year	Yankee Express
Irish Greyhound of the Year	Im Slippy
Trainers Championship	Natalie Savva

== Summary ==
The National Greyhound Racing Club (NGRC) released the annual returns, with totalisator turnover slightly down at £61,932,148 and attendances also slightly down recorded at 4,245,995 from 5443 meetings. Track tote retention was 17.5%.

Im Slippy, a white and blue brindle dog was voted Irish Greyhound of the Year, he won the 1983 English Greyhound Derby at White City. Yankee Express, a brindle dog, trained by George Curtis was voted Greyhound of the Year after winning a second successive Scurry Gold Cup title at Slough, the October 1980 whelp had performed well in the Derby and also won the Pall Mall Stakes.

== Tracks ==
After failing to secure new premises at Oxleaze and Churchdown, the decision was made to close Gloucester & Cheltenham Stadium, the final meeting was held on 22 October. Many of the trainers and greyhounds were accommodated by the Swindon and Bristol Racing Manager's Bill Hiscock and Ken Whitrow respectively. Gloucester's leading trainer Janet Dickenson joined Bristol. Later in the year ADT (British Car Auctions) purchased Abbey Stadium and used its large car park as a base for their sales.

Ladbrokes sold Brough Park to Glassedin Greyhounds Ltd, headed by James Glass, father of female trainer Jane Glass. Cambridge had their NGRC licence cancelled and reverted once again to independent status leaving some top trainers looking for a new attachment. Joe Cobbold went private and would eventually put the Utopia kennels in the hands of son and daughter in law, Trevor and Pam. Linda Mullins took up a position at Crayford, Theo Mentzis and Natalie Savva both went to Milton Keynes and Paddy Hancox moved from Perry Barr to Hall Green. Ayr Greyhound Stadium opened on 6 August.

== News ==
White City trainer Randy Singleton retired and was replaced by Ray Peacock and Frank Baldwin. Walthamstow Racing Manager Ray Spalding left to be replaced by Tony Smith. Seeding for open races was controversially scrapped as a recommendation from the Greyhound Racing Association's chief racing manager Bob Rowe, there was an opinion that segregating wide runners and railers in trap draws favoured those seeded wide.

Five track records fell on the English Greyhound Derby final night, including that for the Derby distance when Hay Maker Mack became the first dog ever to break the 29-second barrier, posting 28.95 seconds. Hay Maker Mack had won a Derby heat before being knocked out and his racing career ended soon afterwards, when he sustained a broken hock during the Essex Vase at Romford.

Decoy Lassie finished runner up in the Cesarewitch at Belle Vue but took consolation from winning the Steward's Cup and Cearns Memorial.

Whisper Wishes, an August 1981 black dog, son of Sand Man bred in Ireland by Mrs G. Naylor out of her brood bitch, Micklem Drive was put with Maidstone's Charlie Coyle. After a year that consisted of only 15 races, winning six of them including the Courage Select Stakes at Wembley he came into the ownership of Irishman John Duffy. Duffy pencilled in the following year's Derby for his hound.

== Ireland ==
The Boyne Valley Greyhound Stadium in Navan is suspended by the Bord na gCon after they discovered that it owed more than £5,000 in unpaid prize money. Irish star Supreme Tiger trained by Matt O'Donnell broke a hock when preparing for the Anglo-Irish International and was retired

English Derby champion Im Slippy returned to Northern Ireland and won the Guinness National Sprint at Dunmore remaining undefeated throughout the event and winning the final by four lengths from Ring Beacon in 29.30 seconds. He became one of a select few to win a Classic event on both sides of the Irish Sea. After being retired he went on to prove himself one of the most influential stud greyhounds of modern times.

Belvedere Bran won the £25,000 Carroll's 1983 Irish Greyhound Derby. Litter sisters Kerogue Nella and Kerogue Sarah finished first and second during the running of the Irish TV Trophy.

== Principal UK races ==
Daily Mirror Grand National, White City (April 2 500m h, £4,000)
Pos	Name of Greyhound	Trainer	SP	Time	Trap
1st	Sir Winston	George Curtis	5-1	31.09	5
2nd	Master Bob	Mark Sullivan	13-8f	31.13	2
3rd	Wolseleys Scout	Gunner Smith	7-1	31.29	1
4th	Anner Duke	Phil Rees Jr.	5-2	31.51	3
5th	Bonnet Up	Stan Gudgin	3-1	31.54	6
6th	Black Steel		8-1	31.58	4

BBC TV Trophy, Walthamstow (Mar 3, 820m, £3,000)
Pos	Name of Greyhound	Trainer	SP	Time	Trap
1st	Sandy Lane	George Curtis	7-4	52.43	5
2nd	Adamstown Miller		33-1	52.77	4
3rd	Minnies Matador	Paddy Milligan	5-4f	52.87	2
4th	Glenbrien Ranger		14-1	52.93	6
5th	Jos Gamble	Jerry Fisher	5-1	52.97	3
6th	Eastern Highway		10-1	53.15	1

Laurels, Wimbledon (May 6, 460m, £5,000)
Pos	Name of Greyhound	Trainer	SP	Time	Trap
1st	Darkie Fli	F Stevens	2-1f	27.87	5
2nd	Raceway Mick	Adam Jackson	5-1	27.99	3
3rd	Deep Gold	Paddy Milligan	8-1	28.02	2
4th	Winning Line	Chandler - MK	10-1	28.34	4
5th	Big Ideas	Terry Duggan	4-1	28.44	1
6th	Aglish Poacher	Jerry Fisher	5-2	28.47	6

Scurry Gold Cup, Slough (Jul 16, 442m, £5,000)
Pos	Name of Greyhound	Trainer	SP	Time	Trap
1st	Yankee Express	George Curtis	8-11f	26.84	4
2nd	Squire Cass	Terry Dartnall	9-1	27.18	2
3rd	Thor	John Cox	5-1	27.34	1
4th	Sammy Bear	George Curtis	10-1	27.42	6
5th	Ebony Chieftain	John Copplestone	6-1	27.43	3
6th	Adventure Kit		12-1	27.69	5

Scottish Greyhound Derby, Shawfield (Aug 19, 500m, £4,000)
Pos	Name of Greyhound	Trainer	SP	Time	Trap
1st	On Spec	Harry Crapper	2-1	30.50	4
2nd	Go Winston	Ralph Smith	1-1f	30.58	3
3rd	Kylehill Legart		6-1	30.92	5
4th	Cooladine Jet	Edna Armstrong	10-1	31.00	6
5th	Knockhill Action		33-1	31.24	2
6th	Hot Darkie		5-1	31.34	1

St Leger, Wembley (Sep 2, 655m, £7,500)
Pos	Name of Greyhound	Trainer	SP	Time	Trap
1st	Easy And Slow	Adam Jackson	5-2	40.37	3
2nd	Kings Merlin	Arthur Hitch	5-2	40.38	2
3rd	Bally Star	Linda Mullins	9-4f	40.50	4
4th	Tally Ho Bomber	Arthur Hitch	6-1	40.54	6
5th	Decoy Diamond		20-1	40.82	1
6th	Gabriel Hilda		14-1	40.98	5

Gold Collar, Catford (Sep 24, 555m, £5,000)
Pos	Name of Greyhound	Trainer	SP	Time	Trap
1st	Rathduff Tad	Tony Dennis	7-1	35.13	5
2nd	Easy And Slow	Adam Jackson	1-1f	35.19	6
3rd	Huberts Shade	Adam Jackson	4-1	35.27	3
4th	Rathkenny Lassie	Miss M Coleman	20-1	35.33	4
5th	Wheelers Tory	Peter Payne	5-1	35.36	2
6th	Copper Beechers	George Curtis	8-1	35.52	1

Cesarewitch, Belle Vue (Oct 1, 815m, £3,000)
Pos	Name of Greyhound	Trainer	SP	Time	Trap
1st	Jos Gamble	Jerry Fisher	5-2	50.90	1
2nd	Decoy Lassie	Joe Cobbold	5-1	51.14	5
3rd	Gala Special	Barney O'Connor	7-1	51.36	2
4th	Sandy Lane	George Curtis	7-4f	51.37	3
5th	Send A Dream	Brian Thompson	7-2	51.63	4
6th	Forever Cruising	Linda Mullins	8-1	52.17	6

The Grand Prix, Walthamstow (Oct 15, 640m, £5,000)
Pos	Name of Greyhound	Trainer	SP	Time	Trap
1st	Flying Duke	Paddy Coughlan	4-1	40.49	2
2nd	Forever Cruising	Linda Mullins	7-1	40.69	6
3rd	Winning Line	Chandler – MK	7-2	40.79	5
4th	Split Image	Rita Hayward	13-8f	40.87	1
5th	Alleys Goldie	George Curtis	6-1	41.01	4
6th	Killury Sunset		25-1	41.33	3

Oaks, Harringay (Oct 28, 475m, £7,000)
Pos	Name of Greyhound	Trainer	SP	Time	Trap
1st	Major Grove	Eric Pateman	6-1	28.59	3
2nd	Gals Girl	Arthur Hitch	11-4	28.69	6
3rd	Astrosyn Doll	Ray Peacock	10-1	28.99	4
4th	If So	Sam Sykes	6-4f	29.00	2
5th	Hollywood Molly	Ted Griffin	8-1	29.01	5
6th	Ferns Best	Pete Beamount	6-1	29.07	1

== Totalisator returns ==
Extended content

The totalisator returns declared to the National Greyhound Racing Club for the year 1983 are listed below.

Stadium	Turnover £
London (White City)	7,189,442
London (Walthamstow)	6,690,172
London (Wimbledon)	4,641,423
Romford	3,677,493
London (Harringay)	3,453,476
Brighton & Hove	3,264,841
London (Catford)	2,686,946
Slough	2,628,665
London (Wembley)	2,391,662
Manchester (Belle Vue)	2,152,987
Birmingham (Hall Green)	2,060,096
Edinburgh (Powderhall)	1,758,864
Crayford & Bexleyheath	1,404,539
Southend-on-Sea	1,329,850
Glasgow (Shawfield)	1,272,656

Stadium	Turnover £
Sheffield (Owlerton)	1,218,412
Ramsgate	945,028
Wolverhampton (Monmore)	875,571
Newcastle (Brough Park)	866,041
Yarmouth	861,687
Portsmouth	734,353
London (Hackney)	703,589
Gloucester & Cheltenham	665,600
Birmingham (Perry Barr, old)	600,277
Maidstone	587,750
Derby	567,487
Bristol	535,712
Oxford	525,200
Milton Keynes	523,380
Ipswich	426,693

Stadium	Turnover £
Newcastle (Gosforth)	400,510
Hull (Old Craven Park)	398,817
Reading	377,441
Rye House	357,687
Nottingham	355,503
Henlow (Bedfordshire)	352,251
Cradley Heath	347,357
Cambridge	344,841
Poole	334,152
Middlesbrough	317,806
Leicester	260,907
Coventry	247,418
Swindon	228,707
Peterborough	188,959
Norton Canes	180,000
