= Galway Greyhound Stadium =

Multi-purpose stadium in Galway, Ireland

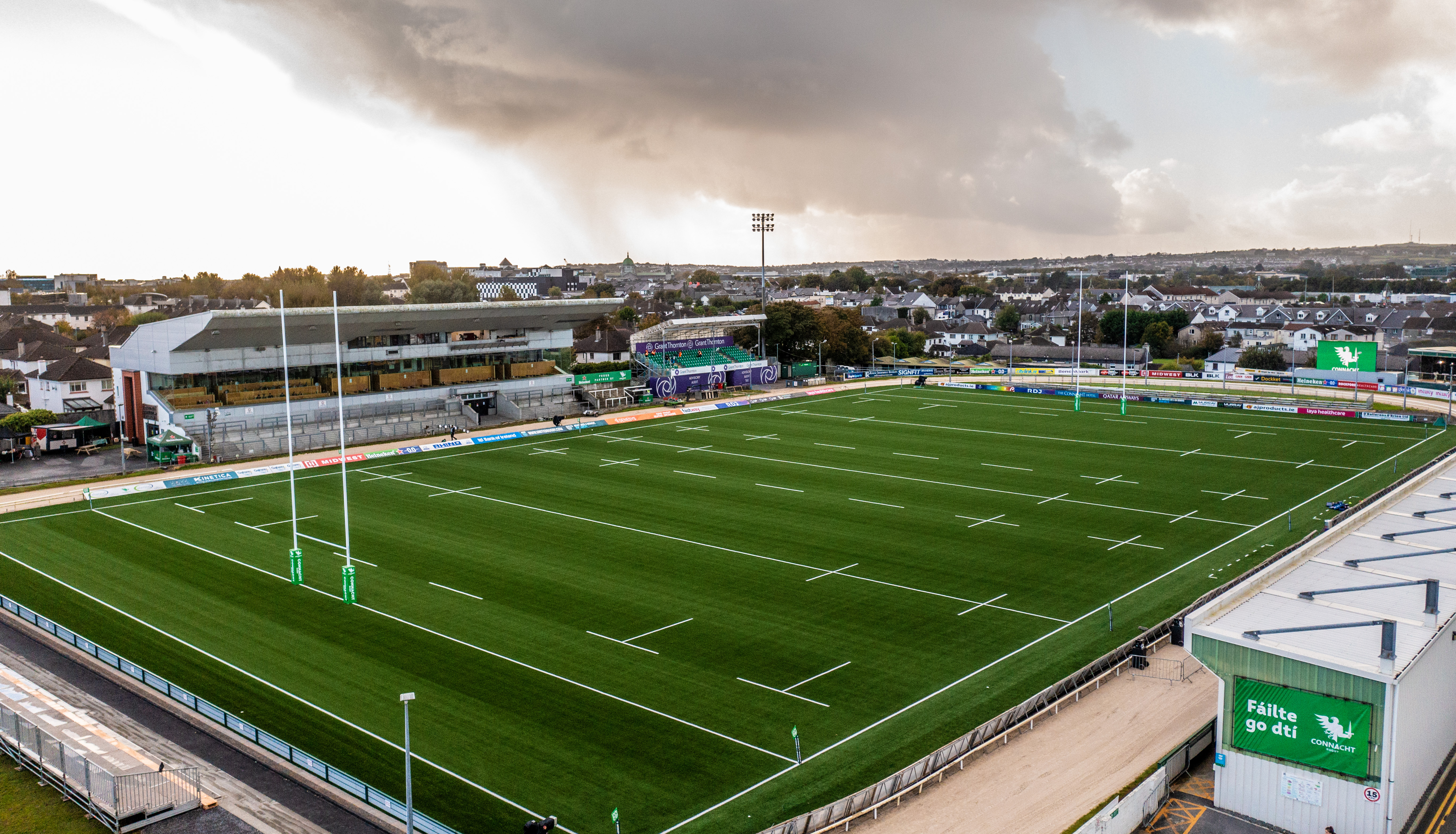
- The greyhound track can be seen around the perimeter of the rugby pitch.
- Interactive map of Galway Greyhound Stadium
- Location: College Road, Galway, Ireland
- Coordinates: 53.2790°N 9.0397°W
- Owner: The Galway Agricultural & Sports Society Ltd
- Surface: Track (all-sand)
- Public transit: Galway railway station

Construction
- Opened: 1932

Tenants
- Greyhound Racing Ireland; Connacht Rugby

Website
- Greyhounds

Galway Greyhound Stadium formerly Galway Sportsgrounds, is the home of greyhound racing in Galway. The operators, Greyhound Racing Ireland host race fixtures throughout the year, primarily on Friday and Saturday evenings and the race distances are 350, 525, 550, and 575 yards. The feature competition at the track is the Champion Bitch Stake. The grass pitch inside the greyhound track is used by Connacht Rugby and when rugby union is held the stadium is known as The Sportsground for sponsorship purposes.

== History ==
The Galway Greyhound Racing Company was established in 1929 but it took a further three years for the first greyhound racing to take place at the west coast venue on the west side of the Lough Atalia. The opening night was slightly delayed before finally taking place on 1 July 1932. The first Racing Manager was Eugene Kelly. The company was set up with £2,000 of capital by the directors Joseph Young, Henry Anderson, Martin Brennan, C.J. Kerin, John D.Whelan, M.J.Lydon, Thomas McDonagh, Philip O'Gorman, Jeremiah O'Sullivan. J.J. Flavin and Martin McDonagh.

After a successful first season, the track re-opened for 1933, with significant improvements having taken place at the 'Sports Field', including a cover added to the main stand. In 1935, the Galway Greyhound Owners' Association was formed. In 1937, Mr Pat White was appointed the new manager of the track after switching from Enniscorthy Greyhound Stadium.

The stadium operated through the majority of World War II and was a very popular destination, drawing in large attendances, partly due to the lack of other entertainment during the period. By 1946, the track was holding five meetings per week, overseen by Racing Manager M.A Cunningham and some races offered £300 for the win (a significant amount at the time).

In 1959, a dispute over rent increases arose between directors of the greyhound racing and the Galway Sports Society, who owned the grounds and threatened to end the greyhound racing. Edward 'Ned' Shea replaced Martin Divilly as track manager in 1960 and Micheál Ó Droigheaín, another former Galway track manager died in 1964. Another problem arose in 1974, when the track was closed over ownership issues. The issue was that the Galway Agricultural & Sports Society wished to sell the racing licence to the Bord na gCon and refused to let the Galway Racing Company operate (the Galway Racing Company had held the licence since 1932). It finally resulted in the track being taken over by the Bord na gCon in October 1974.

By 1978, the stadium required renovation and the Bord na gCon decided that improvements could only be completed with the closure of the greyhound track. Therefore, in 1978 a new stand with bars and tote facilities was built and the circuit itself was re-laid with increased cambers. The grand re-opening was on 25 May 1979, with the modernisation costing over £500,000.

In March 1998, the track was converted to sand from grass but the owners and breeders were frustrated at the funding levels by the Bord na gCon. In 2003, the track was subject to a major renovation project that cost the Bord na gCon €6m. The project was overseen by Racing Manager Ollie Hester, who joined the track in 2000.

In recent years the stadium has raced on the Friday and Saturday evenings and was also subject to criticism over attendance figures, which were distorted by TV requirements.

== Track records ==
Current

Yards	Greyhound	Time	Date	Date
325	Droopys Marco	17.37	28 July 2004	
350	Mall Brandy	18.62	7 June 2013	
525	Raha Mofo	28.20	18 November 2022	
550	Handy Princess	29.66	10 March 2007	Champion Bitch Stakes Final
550	Hanover Phantom	=29.66	28 May 2022	
575	Si Senor	30.97	24 November 2007	
700	Tyrur Rachel	38.69	30 July 2007	
725	Bogberry Molly	40.84	27 July 2013	
810	Iflookscouldkill	45.09	4 August 2007	
1010	Flandy	58.85	3 October 2008	
525 H	Top Lark	29.34	23 July 2004	

Former

Extended content

Yards	Greyhound	Time	Date	Date
325	Hello Guy	18.61	1950	
325	Hello Guy	18.15	1960	
325	Move Solar	18.05	1970	
325	Shashana	18.05	1970	=equalled
325	Ardrine Belle	17.88	28 August 1970	
325	Clare Lodge	17.72	26 July 1993	
325	The Quiffer	17.79	27 August 1982	
325	Altinure Chief	17.56	22 June 2001	
325	Tolmaker Hugh	17.54	19 July 2002	
330	Carra Ree	18.60	8 May 1950	
330	Move Handy	18.05	19 November 1966	
350	Aulton Class	19.35	1 August 2007	
350	Universal Class	19.24	30 August 2007	
350	Liketheclappers	18.80	15 December 2007	
350	Balliniska Woods	18.70	29 July 2009	
350	Hurry Back	18.68	5 August 2011	
500	Golden Victory	28.82	20 April 1951	
525	Tannette	31.50	5 May 1933	
525	Tell Me	31.15	10 May 1933	
525	Corrib Side	31.42	28 June 1935	
525	Marching Through Georgia	30.00	1939	
525	Spanish Battleship			
525	Gortkelly Hope	29.57	1970	
525	Fly On Boy	29.54	29 July 1970	
525	Splendid Silver	29.50	18 June 1976	
525	New Line Bridge	29.46	12 July 1985	
525	No Road Back	29.34	June 1997	
525	No Road Back	29.05	July 1997	
525	Magical Guest	29.25	2 August 2000	
525	Spring Motion	29.12	4 August 2001	
525	Plucky Customer	28.83	31 July 2002	
525	Master Tom	28.82	6 September 2003	
525	Joes Lang	28.77	31 October 2003	
525	Niamhs Old Forge	28.70	7 November 2003	
525	Tyrur Marita	28.51	10 January 2004	
525	Deel Rover	28.49	16 July 2005	
525	Droopys Commanche	28.47	22 July 2005	
525	Holborn Post	28.46	29 July 2006	
525	Hillcroft Josie	28.34	28 July 2007	
525	Raha Mofo	28.27	11 November 2022	
550	Erris Rebel	31.30	1943	
550	Fealeside Duke	31.28	26 August 1977	
550	Ollies Missy	30.74	31 July 1986	
550	Crossleigh Fudge	30.30	27 June 1999	
550	Tyrur Bello	30.12	19 July 2002	
550	Coolio	30.11	4 December 2003	
550	Tyrur Marita	29.82	21 May 2004	
550	Handy Princess	29.74	3 March 2007	Champion Bitch Stakes semi-final
575	Tom and Gerry	31.77	1 August 2007	
575	Illtellyouthis	31.43	8 September 2007	
575	Line of Fire	31.26	3 November 2007	
600	Farmhill Prince		35.05 1950	
700	Rambling Customer	41.12	17 June 1960	
700	Clonmohan Lucy	41.12	15 July 1960	=equalled
700	Moyglare Choice	40.46	17 December 1999	
700	Hello Bud	39.25	1 August 2001	
700	Hello Bud	39.25	31 July 2002	
700	Mustang Kylie	39.16	23 July 2004	
700	Midland Fire	39.10	20 May 2006	
700	Blackjack Baggio	39.02	24 November 2006	
810	Desert Chicken	48.80	1970	
810	Skilful Story	46.80	8 August 1975	
810	Deerwood	46.60	29 July 1985	
810	Raheen Treasure	45.95	30 July 2002	
810	Eye Rocket	45.85	23 July 2004	
810	Group Champ	45.44	30 October 2004	
810	Drominboy Jet	45.33	30 July 2005	
810	Iflookscouldkill	45.15	4 July 2007	
325 H	Levally Roe	19.00	13 June 1958	
330 H	Halsham Playboy	19.80	3 September 1955	
330 H	Gambling Editor	19.75	1956	
525 H	Bay Moon	31.00	1939	
525 H	Golsto	30.55	14 July 1956	
525 H	Group Stinger	29.65	16 September 2000	
525 H	Slanemore Ivy	29.65	2002	
525 H	Top Lark	29.48	4 December 2003	
550 H	Gormans Fancy	32.90	1950	
