= Youghal Greyhound Stadium =

Greyhound racing venue in County Cork, Ireland

- Interactive map of Youghal Greyhound Stadium
- Location: Claycastle, Youghal, County Cork, Ireland
- Coordinates: 51°56′24.5″N 7°51′25.4″W
- Operated by: Greyhound Racing Ireland
- Date opened: 1948
- Race type: greyhound racing

Youghal Greyhound Stadium is a greyhound racing track located south of Youghal, County Cork, Ireland. The stadium is a 20 minute walk from the town centre.

== History ==
On 30 July 1948 a gr eyhound called Hackles Spring won the first ever race at Youghal. The seaside track on the Upper Strand was run by the Youghal Racing Company before Rásaíocht Con Eireann took over in 1972. The track originally hosted races on Tuesday and Friday nights. Main events have included the Blackwater Cup, Paddy Stakes and Aherne Memorial Cup.

Finbarr Coleman was racing manager for thirty years, from 1972 until 2002. Brian Collins and Pat Leahy both had short stints as Racing Manager until 2006 when Kathleen Lennon (daughter of the reeder and trainer Denny) Lennon took over ,abecoming reland’s first female Racing Manager. Lennon left in 2012 to take over at Kilcohan Park. {cn}} John McGrath was appointed as the Racing and Commercial Manager from 2012.

In 2012, Greyhound Racing Ireland announced plans to spend over €100,000 to deliver improvements at the track. The improvements were completed in April 2014 and Tom Hayes, Minister of State at the Department of Agriculture, Food and the Marine opened the renewed facility. The refurbishment included a new judges box, and ultimately cost €134,000.

It was announced that Curraheen Park and Youghal Greyhound Stadium had helped raise more than €5m for charities, clubs and other good causes in 2015.

In 2023, the stadium signed a contract agreement with S.I.S regarding the broadcasting rights for early evening fixtures (6.05pm) that were introduced. Consequently, criticism arose over the €763,000 in state funding that had been received from 2020 to 2023 in light of a GRI statement that the meetings were not conducive to attracting public attendance, with an average of just three spectators per meeting, the remaining attendees being owners, trainers and bookmakers. Attendance in 2022 had averaged 22 persons per meeting. In December 2023, the stadium renewed the contract agreement (under the aegis of the GRI) with S.I.S for 2024.

== Operations ==
Racing takes place every Monday and Friday evening and the facilities include a fast food outlet, a bar, totalisator betting and inside and external viewing areas.

The circuit is 464 yards in circumference and race distances are 325, 525 and 550 yards. The track has several feature events in the Irish racing calendar.

== Track records ==
Current

Yards	Greyhound	Time	Date	Notes
325	Lemon Clover	17.34	11 October 1996	
525	Whitty Guinness	28.54	29 October 2010	
550	Whatsupjack	29.91	18 September 2009	
700	Tinas Girl	38.79	19 August 2003	
790	Shining Rumble	44.76	13 July 2004	

Former

Yards	Greyhound	Time	Date	Notes
325	Wonderful Era	17.80	20 September 1968	
325	Spotlight Mark	17.80	21 September 1971	
325	Basking Shark	17.70	23 August 1974	
325	Lough Tan	17.48	15 August 1986	
325	Greenane Catcher	17.46	7 September 1990	
350	Joyful Bob	19.65	1953	
500	Tillie O'Lear	28.90	1960	
525	Speedyman	29.45	28 June 1968	
525	Special Check	29.00	27 July 1976	
525	Glenpark Dancer	28.90	15 November 1985	
525	Gabirel Wonder	28.82	20 August 1991	
525	Gold Spitfire	28.80	22 August 1997	
525	Coolmona Dave	28.66	9 May 2003	
525	Boherduff Light	28.66	10 October 2003	
525	Boherduff Light	28.61	25 June 2004	
525	Boherduff Light	28.61	2 July 2004	
550	Pools Punter	30.85	2 August 1968	
550	Clashing Breeze	30.80	19 August 1977	
550	Glorious Champ	30.75	1978	Paddy Stakes semi-final
550	Glorious Champ	30.75	1978	Paddy Stakes Final
550	Blanco Kerry	30.65	13 July 1978	
550	Killaclug Jet	30.60	1979	Paddy Stakes Final
550	Lispopple Tiger	30.20	31 May 1985	
550	Borna Best	29.94	9 May 1997	
550	Clover Hare	29.92	13 September 2002	
700	Baylough Proud	40.35	2 September 1977	
700	Huberts Thacher	40.35	13 July 1978	
700	Man of Ice	40.20	1980	
700	Blondie Brown	39.68	26 August 1983	
700	Barbery Glade	39.68	13 August 1989	
700	Gaytime Blonde	39.36	29 August 1997	
700	Toms Mixture	39.09	20 August 2002	
790	Rovigno	45.70	27 June 1969	
790	Whittle Off	45.30	18 July 1972	
790	Fen Tiger	44.92	4 July 1986	
990	Wonderful Meudy	59.18	2 August 1986	
990	Queenies Fire	59.14	15 June 1990	
525 H	Super Fellow	30.70	17 July 1962	
