= Newbridge Greyhound Stadium =

Greyhound racing venue in County Kildare, Ireland

- Interactive map of Newbridge Greyhound Stadium
- Location: Milltown Road, Cornelscourt, Newbridge, County Kildare, W12 FV06; Ireland
- Coordinates: 53.1903°N 6.8229°W
- Operated by: Greyhound Racing Ireland
- Date opened: 1972
- Race type: greyhound racing

Newbridge Greyhound Stadium is a greyhound racing track located northwest of Newbridge, County Kildare, Ireland.

Racing takes place every Friday evening and the facilities include the grandstand Masters Restaurant and Barkers Bar which offers ample seating.

Race distances are 325, 525, 550, 575 and 750 yards and the feature competitions are the Unraced Bitch Stake, the Juvenile Derby and the Newbridge Oaks.

== History ==
Following the closure of the old Newbridge greyhound track around St Conleth's Park in 1968 the operation was relocated to a more rural location north of the town near the Rickardstown/Cornelscourt area. It was still, however, within easy reach of the town and racing would originally take place every Monday and Friday. The new circuit was constructed in 1972, and the management brought the long-running Cox Cup with them. Named after the stadium landlords the Cox family (PJ Cox and sons Dermot and David). The new circuit tended to be a fast track with a large circumference of 520 yards. The new facilities included a glass-enclosed bar which allowed patrons to view not only the racing but the kennels and weighing room as well. During 1978 further changes were made with a facelift for the main stand; this was the same year that long-standing racing manager Denis Brennan gave up the racing manager's seat that was then taken by Christy Connolly.

The Cox Cup allowed the Newbridge public to view some of the sport's fastest greyhounds, including Ardfert Mick, who broke the track record during the 1991 event. Despite the track facing financial problems at various times, there were more track improvements in 2002, which provided a welcome rejuvenation. On 26 March 2011 the Cox family and the Newbridge Greyhound Racing Company called it a day and decided to close following a downturn in the economic climate. The management stated there has been a reduction in attendances, sponsorship and secondary business activity. The Cox Cup was held from 1964 to 2018.

Following a five-month closure it re-opened in August 2011 under the Morgan & Franklin Consortium headed by Managing Director David Morgan who provided renewed investment. Morgan had worked at a senior level with Irish Greyhound Board (IGB) in the past and was also the stadium director for Semple Stadium. The consortium included Peter Franklin, former head of marketing of the IGB and was called Morwell Racing Ltd. However, problems persisted at the track and in March 2013 Morwell Racing Ltd ceased racing.

Welcome news arrived shortly afterwards in 2013 when the IGB stepped in, this time led by the IGB's Philip Peake, and took control of the venue. The track recommenced racing once again on Friday and Saturday nights. Following the COVID-19 pandemic the track was forced into temporary closure but re-opened later, although racing is currently held on Friday evenings only.

== Track records ==
Current

Yards	Greyhound	Time	Date	Notes
325	Deanridge Onfire	17.21	7 August 2020	
525	Droopys Curio	28.07	13 March 2020	
550	Redwood Mick	29.50	30 May 2014	Cox Cup semi final
575	Wilcos Mate	31.12	14 July 2006	
600	Tyrur Chris	32.40	11 June 2010	
750	Maireads Pearl	41.43	5 April 2019	
845	Rough Quest	47.38	30 October 2009	
525 H	Frightened Pig	29.14	9 July 2004	

Former

Yards	Greyhound	Time	Date	Notes
300	Clane Mint	16.50	11 June 1976	
300	Joannes Treasure	16.44	31 August 1990	
300	Rockspring Peer	16.20	5 May 2000	
325	Cool Gamble	17.38	17 January 2003	
325	Kafima	17.37	14 October 2005	
325	Yes Boss	17.35	8 November 2009	
325	Junior Jet	17.27	16 June 2017	
525	Shamrock Point	29.08	October 1974	
525	Some Skinomage	29.02	6 June 1977	
525	Wise Band	29.02	21 June 1985	
525	Airmount Grand	28.86	September 1988	
525	Ardfert Mick	28.68	22 June 1991	Cox Cup heats
525	Judicial Pride	28.58	14 June 1999	
525	Velvet Commander	28.58	25 October 2003	
525	Spell Bound	28.42	31 October 2003	
525	Hillcroft Josie	28.39	19 October 2007	
525	Maireads Fantasy	28.23	23 October 2009	Newbridge Oaks 2nd round
525	Cushie Jet	28.21	31 August 2018	2018 Juvenile Derby Round 2
525	Ballymac Anton	28.18	7 September 2018	Texacloth Juvenile Derby semi final
550	Track Whisper	30.46	17 July 1987	
550	Carlow Country	30.18	23 September 1988	
550	Droopys Mossie	29.96	3 July 1994	
550	Premier County	29.93	30 November 2001	
550	Ten Men	29.81	11 July 2003	
550	Simply Vintage	29.71	11 July 2003	
550	Top Boe	29.62	2 July 2004	Cox Cup second round
550	Definate Opinion	29.56	4 June 2010	Cox Cup semi-finals
550	Tyrur Bucko	29.51	11 June 2010	Cox Cup Final
550	Redwood Mick	29.50	30 May 2014	Cox Cup semi-finals
575	The Other Master	32.56	2 August 2002	
575	Sonic Pearl	32.42	5 August 2002	
575	Pickwick Song	31.87	9 August 2002	
575	Curryhills Wade	31.50	16 August 2002	
575	Cabbage White	31.26	23 August 2002	
575	Awesome Impact	31.24	26 May 2003	
600	Red Smoke	33.34	9 April 1976	
600	Synone Crest	32.97	24 July 1987	
600	Lisk Raven	32.90	4 September 1989	
600	Guess Twice	32.86	28 June 1991	
600	Charlie Bird	32.72	19 July 2002	
600	Walking Sunday	32.71	19 July 2002	
600	Pennys Sunstar	32.69	6 September 2008	
600	Dangerous Man	32.64	4 September 2009	
750	Loch Bo Anchor	42.34	3 July 1994	
750	Me Rocket	42.18	2 June 2003	
750	Beaming Surprise	41.98	16 January 2004	
750	Hulkster	41.85	5 November 2005	
750	Bricken Maley	41.82	7 June 2013	
750	Jet Stream View	41.59	29 March 2019	
820	August Blossom	46.90	4 October 1991	
820	Fast Remark	46.76	30 June 2000	
845	Metric Tiger	47.75	21 July 2002	
845	Recovery Mission	47.73	23 May 2003	
845	Marshalls Trigger	47.68	30 December 2004	
845	Pretty Fantasy	47.57	16 December 2007	
525 H	Moreen Flamingo	30.08	6 July 1977	
525 H	No Promises	29.92	3 July 1987	
525 H	Swiss Champ	29.18	29 April 2002	

== Former competitions ==
- Cox Cup
