= Mullingar Greyhound Stadium =

Greyhound racing venue in County Westmeath, Ireland

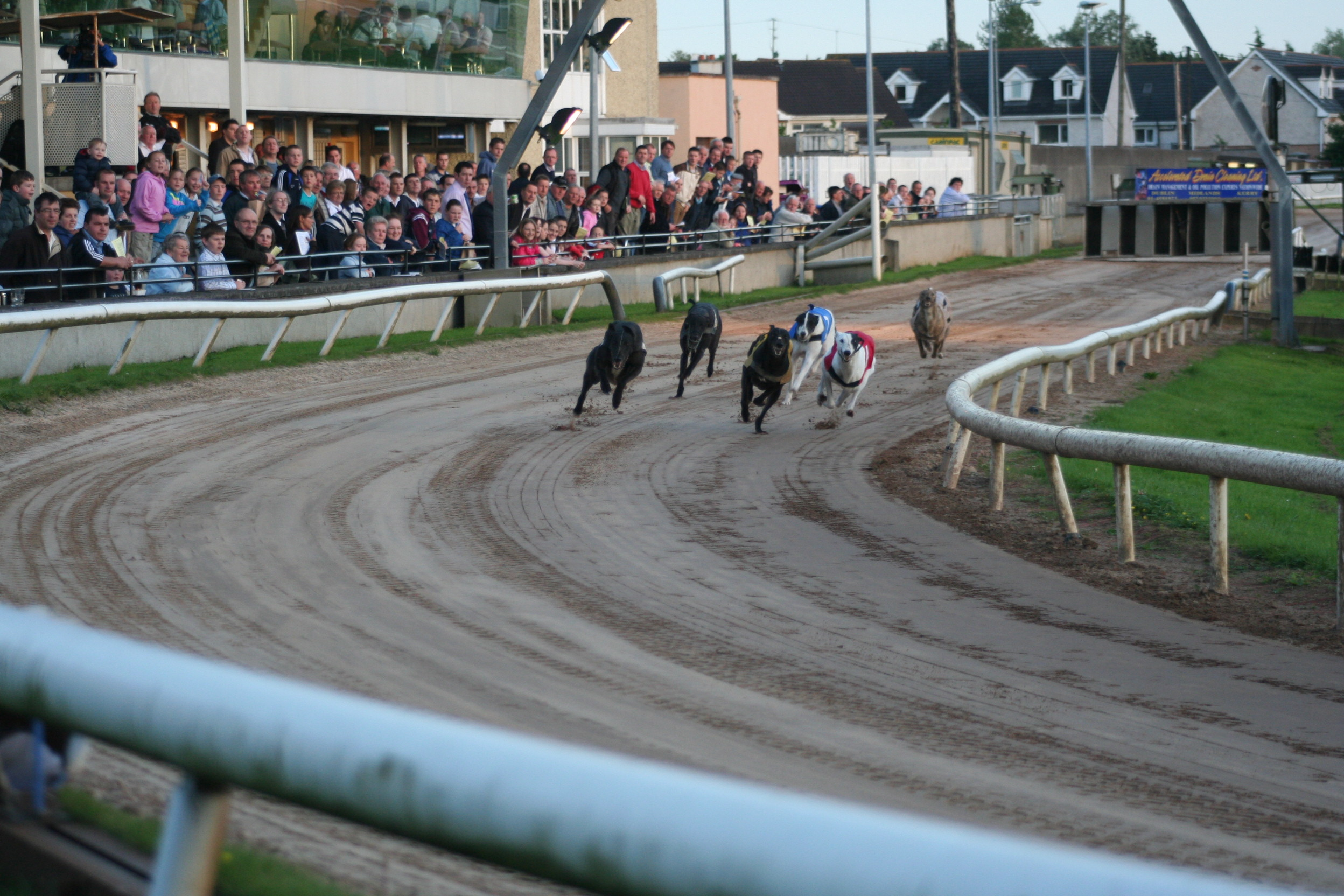
- Greyhounds racing in the stadium, July 2008
- Location: Mullingar, County Westmeath, Ireland
- Coordinates: 53°31′16.89″N 7°20′22.24″W
- Operated by: Greyhound Racing Ireland
- Date opened: 16 August 1932; 92 years ago
- Race type: Greyhound

Mullingar Greyhound Stadium is a greyhound racing track located in south Mullingar in Ireland. The stadium has a grandstand restaurant, a fast food outlet and a number of bars. Racing takes place on a Saturday evening at 7.30pm and early Sunday afternoon.

== History ==
=== History ===
Mullingar stands directly west of the R400 road and just north of the Newbrook Road. In the 1950s, the track underwent improvements including banking of the bends to compensate for a rather unusual shaped 498 yards (455 m) circumference circuit. The first racing manager was Billy Bligh who served in that post until 1978 before handing over to Peter Kenny. Bligh had a greyhound called Splonk who won on the opening night at Shelbourne Park way back in 1927. A new stand and clubhouse was erected in 1972 and the provincial track boasted some of the best facilities outside Dublin. Prominent sire, Castledown Lad started racing here in the 1930s followed by Newdown Heather. Races over the years have included the Midland Puppy Stakes, Midland St Leger, Joe Clyne Memorial and Midland Cesarewitch.

In recent times the Mullingar Greyhound Racing Company has invested in the facilities with addition fo a 130 seated grandstand restaurant. In 2001, the track was also given an original classic competition, following the closure of the Boyne Valley Greyhound Stadium in Navan. The competition was the Cesarewitch, which had been run over 600 yards at Navan from 1960-1998 before arriving at Mullingar, to be held over the same race distance.

In December 2023, the stadium renewed the contract agreement (as part of the GRI) with S.I.S for 2024.

== Competitions ==
- Cesarewitch

== Track records ==
Current

Yards	Greyhound	Time (sec)	Date	Notes/Ref
330	Urney Ed	18.28	8 August 2020	
350	Noreaction	19.07	4 August 2018	
400	Glendale Zozo	21.03	7 October 2024	
400	Gizmo Cash	=21.06	23 October 2022	
525	Unsinkable Girl	28.88	02 October 1999	
550	Bective Rosy	30.35	30 November 2024	
600	Singalong Dolly	32.74	17 March 2024	Cesarewitch final
805	Bombersgoinghome	46.22	09 September 2007	
810	Coolemount Glen	=46.22	15 May 2010	
525 H	Call Late	29.48	26 September 2009	

Former

Yards	Greyhound	Time (sec)	Date	Notes/ref
300	Kilmagoura Again	17.00	7 September 1971	
325	Greenhill Boxer	18.44	9 November 1983	
325	Portun Flier	18.36	7 July 1990	
325	Bonawinish Lad	18.18	22 September 2001	
330	Red Menace	18.55	2 June 1964	
330	Springwell Lodge	18.51	13 May 2010	
330	He Rocks	18.47	24 March 2018	
330	Twice Shy	18.43	14 March 2020	
350	Kiln Pride	19.10	10 August 2002	
360	Fearless Gaughan	20.30	1939	
360	Clonmeen Garden	20.01	30 August 1958	
400	Kilmalady Boy	21.17	31 July 2003	
400	Fiftycashback	21.10	10 October 2020	
400	Fiftycashback	21.06	17 October 2020	
525	Fearless Gaughan	30.30	1940	
525	Managha Boy	30.28	1940	
525	Rex Again	29.55	16 May 1964	
550	Hello King	31.97	1942	
550	Look Shy	31.28	19 August 1967	
550	Twitters	31.15	12 September 1972	
550	Murrays Mixture	30.88	5 August 1981	
550	Crory County	30.78	22 June 1991	
550	Townspark Prince	30.64	29 September 2001	
550	Chadding Home	30.62	4 November 2004	
550	Forsale Or Rent	30.59	1 September 2007	
550	Furious Flare	30.47	26 January 2008	
550	Clonfert Lorenzo	30.44	15 March 2021	
600	Butterfly Billy	33.61	26 October 1965	
600	Do You Hustle	33.16	23 November 1999	
600	Mega Delight	33.10	24 March 2002	Cesarewitch final
600	Cabbage White	33.05	8 March 2003	
600	Kanoute	32.93	8 March 2003	
600	Sluggers Breeze	33.22	2 August 2003	
600	Karma Knight	33.12	28 March 2004	
600	Strip the Racks	33.01	10 July 2004	
600	Ronans Delight	32.97	11 September 2004	
600	Micks Savings	32.92	15 April 2007	Cesarewitch final
600	Meenagh Miracle	32.75	24 October 2020	Cesarewitch final
780	Little Ice	46.39	24 August 1971	
805	Castanet	47.48	27 June 1987	
805	Lady Erin	47.12	14 May 1988	
805	Moral Park	46.74	22 August 1992	
805	Priceless King	46.58	24 November 2001	
805	Tahina Blue	46.50	23 March 2003	
805	Gowlaun Ranger	46.40	31 July 2004	
810	Comagh Beauty	47.90	19 April 1960	
325 H	Fado	19.06	1988	
360 H	Quiet Sergeant	21.05	17 June 1958	
525 H	Man Friday	30.98	8 September 1964	
525 H	Lodge Walk	30.62	1988	
525 H	Lough Honcho	30.21	25 May 2002	
525 H	Frisby For Me	30.01	23 October 2004	
525 H	Honcho Belle	29.85	4 November 2004	
525 H	Mexico	29.70	10 September 2005	
525 H	Call Late	29.62	22 March 2008	
550 H	Lodge Walk	32.16	1988	
