= Cesarewitch (Irish greyhound race) =

Greyhound racing competition in Ireland

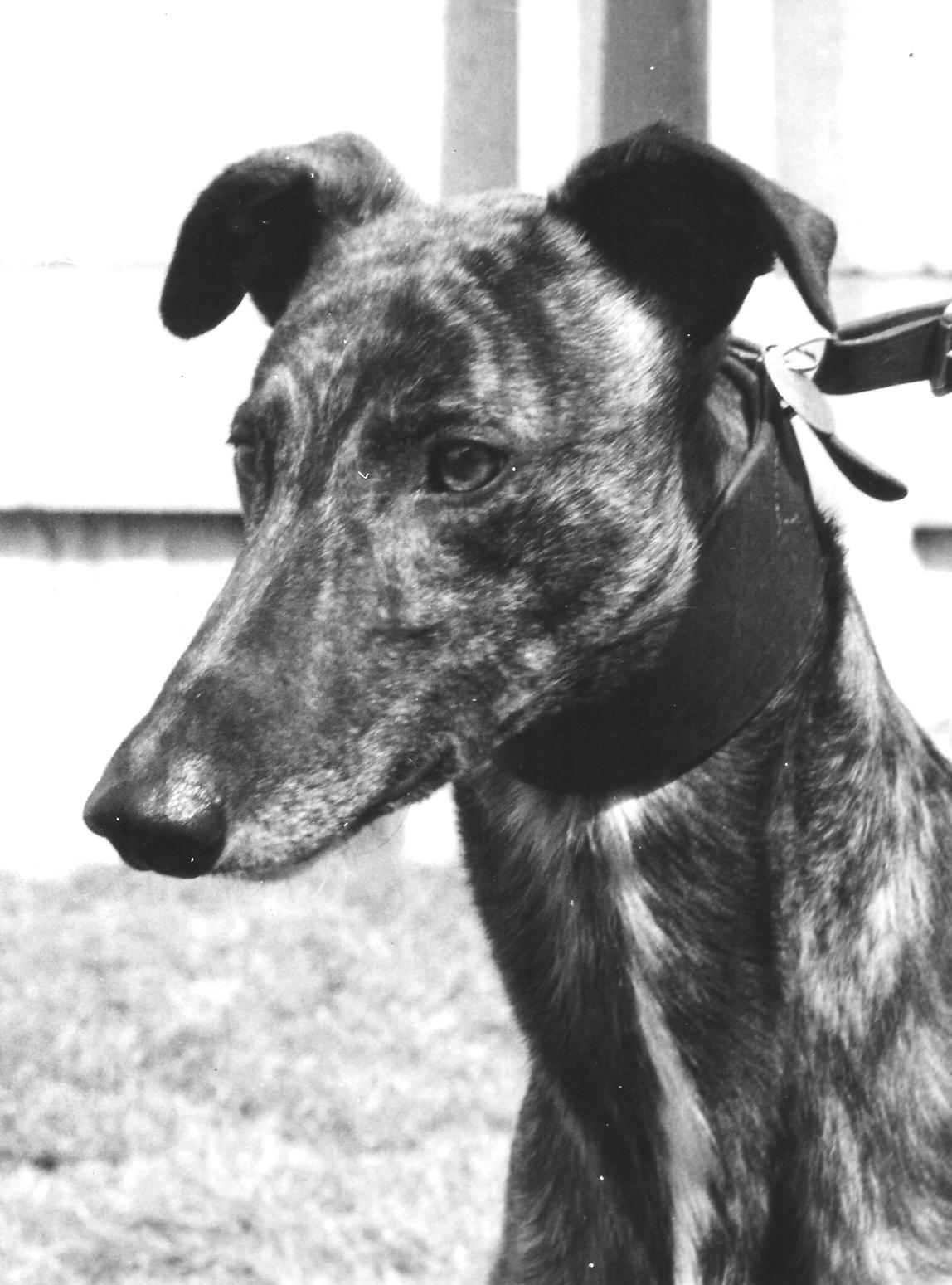
- 1970 winner Postal Vote
- Class: Feature
- Location: Mullingar Greyhound Stadium
- Inaugurated: 1960
- Sponsor: Time Greyhound Nutrition

Race information
- Distance: 600 yards
- Surface: Sand
- Purse: €10,000 (winner)

The Cesarewitch is a greyhound racing competition held annually at Mullingar Greyhound Stadium in Ballinderry, Mullingar, County Westmeath, Ireland.

It was inaugurated as an Irish classic competition at the Boyne Valley Greyhound Stadium in Navan and took place over 600 yards from 1960 to 1998. However following the closure of the Navan track it switched to Mullingar over the same race distance.

== Venues & distances ==
- 1960–1998 (Navan 600y)
- 2001–present (Mullingar 600y)

== Sponsors ==
- 1989–1993 (Navan Track Bookmakers)
- 1994–1996 (Red Mills)
- 1997–1998 (Bar One)
- 2001–2005 (Red Mills)
- 2006–2016 (Gain Feeds)
- 2017–2017 (Wallace & Murray)
- 2018–2018 (All Pet Supplies)
- 2019–2019 (Larry Clancy Memorial)
- 2021–2021 (SIS (Sports Information Services))
- 2022–2023 (Racing Post GTV)
- 2024–2025 (Time)

== Past winners ==
Year	Winner	Breeding	Time (sec)	Trainer	SP	Notes/Ref
1960	Pocket Glass	Fourth of July – Ollys Blackie	33.85	P Gaffney		
1961	Perrys Orchard	Only Perry – Ryans Demon	34.00	Patrick Behan		
1962	Harem Queen	Northern King – Rathlin Christine	34.35	Alexander McConnell	10/1	
1963	Mothel Chief	Knock Hill Chieftain – The Grand Duchess	33.71	Paddy Dunphy		
1964	High Note	Hi There – Westpark Goldilocks	33.80			
1965	Butterfly Billy	Pigalle Wonder – Eight Spot	33.26			
1966	Pendant	Low Pressure – Kilcaskin Krispie	33.59	Tom McDonnell	7/2	
1967	Yanka Boy	Clonalvy Pride – Mille Hawthorn	33.38	Ger McKenna		
1968	Young Ferranti	Stoneview Jet – Shes There	33.88	Mick O'Toole		
1969	April Flower	Newdown Heather – April Merry	33.32	Jack Mullan		
1970	Postal Vote	Dusty Trail – Paddistar	33.08	Gay McKenna		
1971	Rapid Maxi	Monalee Champion – Rapid Fairy	33.22	John Dulargy	1/3f	
1972	Itsachampion	Monalee Champion – Cranog Bet	33.48	Leslie McNair	5/2	
1973	Ritas Choice	Spectre – Toffee Apple II	33.04	Gay McKenna	4/6f	Track record
1974	Ballinatin Boy	Myross Again – Arklow Bay	34.06	John Byrne		
1975	Ballybeg Prim	Rockfield Era – Ballybeg Pride	33.30	Ger McKenna	4/6f	
1976	Murray's Turn	Kilbelin Style – Spring Bell	33.46	Jack Murphy	5/1	
1977	First Debenture	Monalee Champion – Bank Loan	33.70	P O'Malley	8/1	
1978	Gullion Lad	Bright Lad – Woodview Mist	33.76	James McCartan Sr.		
1979	Lomans Lad	Clomoney Jet – Arctic Maid	33.90	A Harte	12/1	
1980	Rahan Ship	Rail Ship – Rwanyena	33.68	John Haynes		
1981	Murray's Mixture	Brush Tim – Stylish Heather	33.54	Francie Murray		
1982	Debbycot Lad	Liberty Lad – Knockshe Hopeful	32.94	Cyril Morris		
1983	Curryhills Sailor	Sail On II – Minorcas Tulip	34.16	Eilish Connolly		
1984	Summerhill Sport	Shamrock Sailor – Penny Farthing	33.44	Michael Enright		
1985	Sharons Postman	Glen Rock – Tipsy Go Flash	33.56	Jack Murphy	7/1	
1986	Cranley Special	Ders Available – Going Going	33.12	Francie Murray	9/4	
1987	Oughter Brigg	Noble Brigg – Dromacossane	33.08	Ger McKenna	3/1	
1988	Keystone Prince	Keystone Rocket – Hardi Hostess	33.60	Matt Travers	5/2	
1989	Gourmet Manor	Manorville Sand – Annagh Moth	33.12	Gerry Duffin		
1990	Fly Cruiser	Moral Support – Lauragh Pride	33.40	Ann Power		
1991	Big Cloud	Glen Park Dancer – Spot Dance	33.18	Eamon McElroy		
1992	Gunboat Jeff	Whisper Wishes – Gunboat Ann	33.32	Joe Kenny	4/1	
1993	Ratify	Wise Band - Barneys Girl	32.68	Seamus Graham		Track record
1994	Roan Hurricane	Leaders Best – Roan Elf	32.80	Matt O'Donnell		
1995	Roan Hurricane	Leaders Best – Roan Elf	33.08	Kevin Mallon	2/1jf	
1996	Bonus Prince	Cry Dalcash – Boozed Ellie	33.16	Paraic Campion	1/1f	
1997	Bonus Prince	Cry Dalcash – Boozed Ellie	33.04	Paraic Campion		
1998	Bonus Prince	Cry Dalcash – Boozed Ellie	33.48	Paraic Campion		
2001	Dale Inferno	Westmead Merlin – Ladywell Girl	33.28	Fraser Black	7/2	
2002	Mega Delight	Smooth Rumble – Knockeevan Girl	33.10	Seamus Graham	5/4f	Track record
2003	Droopys Gloria	Droopys Merson – Lisnakill Vicky	33.58	Graham Calvert	20/1	
2004	Karma Knight	Joannestown Cash – Droopys Andrea	33.12	Stephen Bourke	5/2jf	
2005	Make All	Toms The Best – Glynnscrossqueen	33.29	Graham Calvert	1/1f	
2006	Holborn Major	Top Honcho – Holborn Miss	33.26	James Courtney	5/2	
2007	Micks Savings	Top Savings – Turbo Flight	32.92	Pat Buckley	4/7f	Track record
2008	Forest Baby	Top Honcho – Colorado Tina	33.33	Francis Murray	10/1	
2009	Puckane Lady	Top Savings – Proud Roslea	33.65	Maura Molloy	14/1	
2010	Definate Opinion	Surf Lorian – Josiva	33.20	Patrick Guilfoyle	6/4jf	
2011	Definate Opinion	Surf Lorian – Josiva	33.23	Patrick Guilfoyle	4/5f	
2012	Subway Ruth	Hondo Black – Forest Baby	33.07	Francie Murray	3/1	
2013	Gizmo Classic	Oran Classic – Shelbourne Kay	33.23	John McGee Sr.	4/5f	dead-heat
2013	Ringtown Snowy	Head Bound – Ringtown Blue	33.23	Paul Hennessy	7/2	dead-heat
2014	Kathleens Holly	Kinloch Brae – Razldazl Lily	33.50	Bobby Scullion	6/1	
2015	Paradise Maverik	Royal Impact – Paradise Alanna	32.71	Pat Buckley	4/7f	
2016	Slippery Fred	Tullymurry Act – Droopys Blossom	33.31	Pat Buckley	12/1	
2017	Vivaro Swift	Droopys Scolari – Coolbeg Gemma	33.23	Kenneth Busteed	2/1f	
2018	Master Grizzly	Paradise Madison – Diggers Rest	33.21	Declan Byrne	8/1	
2019	Skywalker Logan	Tarsna Havana – Sizzling Sarah	33.40	Patrick Guilfoyle	5/4f	
2020	Meenagh Miracle	Farloe Rumble – Rios Girl	32.75	Michael Corr	No SP+	Track record
2021	Amazing Alice	Aero Majestic – Droopys Coast	33.20	Patrick Guilfoyle	9/4	
2022	Magical Mary	Droopys Jet – Mystical Moll	33.06	Patrick Guilfoyle	4/7f	
2023	Bobsleigh Dream	Droopys Sydney – Bobsleigh Jet	32.79	Pat Buckley	9/4	
2024	Singalong Dolly	Droopys Sydney – Mydras Dawn	32.74	Pat Buckley	4/11f	Track record
2025	Singalong Dolly	Droopys Sydney – Mydras Dawn	33.62	Pat Buckley	11/4	

+No SP due to COVID-19 pandemic restrictions
