= Lifford Greyhound Stadium =

Sports facility in County Donegal, Ireland

- Location: Ballyduff Road, Lifford, County Donegal, Ireland
- Coordinates: 54°50′05.7″N 7°29′04.3″W
- Operated by: Lifford Greyhound Racing Company Limited
- Date opened: 1959
- Race type: greyhound racing

Lifford Greyhound Stadium is a greyhound racing track located in Lifford, County Donegal, Ireland.

The facilities include the Champion Stakes Restaurant, fast food facilities, a number of bars, totalisator betting and seating. Racing takes place every Friday and Sunday (it was formerly held on Saturday evenings).

Race distances are 325, 525, 550 and 575 yards.

== History ==
The Lifford Greyhound Stadium was built in 1959, when cattle dealer James Magee decided to convert some more of his grazing land from a schooling track into a professional 495 yard circumference circuit. Magee died in 1971 and his sons Cathal and Seamus took over the track as the Racing and General Managers around the same time that a new stand was erected at the venue.

The main event originally held at the track was the Irwin Cup but it did not feature highly on the Irish racing calendar and during the late 1970s an event called the Abraham David Trophy was contested featuring significant prize money. Many top greyhounds have appeared here including Yellow Printer who began his career at Lifford as a puppy. Race distances were 350, 525, 550, 575, 750 and 820 yards.

After 32 years association the track was put up for sale by the Magee family in 1991 and was eventually bought by new owners in 2001 when Willie, Hugh and Patrick Duffy formed the Lifford Greyhound Racing Company. On 11 September 2003 the track re-opened after undergoing a €12m refit with a new grandstand, two restaurants and improved facilities.

=== Closure and reopening ===
During 2018, the stadium was put up for sale at a price of 1.9 million euros. The following year it was announced that the last race meeting would be on Saturday 17 August 2019 before the stadium was closed. Racing Manager Matthew Duffy blamed the lack of support from the Irish Greyhound Board.

During October 2021, it was confirmed that the track would reopen on Sunday 6 March 2022. The racing was brought back by a syndicate called the Lifford Greyhound Racing Club - Canaradzo Ltd headed by Harry Findlay. The track reopened on 23 March 2023 (slightly later than planned).

In June 2024, the track entered into negotiation with Greyhound Racing Ireland for its fixtures to be televised by Sports Information Services (SIS).

== Track records ==
=== Current records (new track) ===
Yards	Greyhound	Time	Date	Notes
325	Gizmo Cash	17.09	24 September 2023	
525	Wi Can Dream	28.54	2 April 2023	
550	Glideaway Alfie	29.97	7 May 2023	
575	Droopys Nextone	31.34	2 April 2023	

=== Former records ===
Extended content

Yards	Greyhound	Time	Date	Notes
325	Golden Ram	17.94	2 September 1961	
325	Munchie	17.90	13 November 1976	
325	Fulmax Fever	17.84	1976	
325	Cooma Slave	17.67	7 June 1986	
325	Eden Castle	17.62	20 July 1991	
325	Pats Gale	17.54	17 August 1996	
325	Fishy Boy	17.24	12 May 2002	
325	Leathems Jet	17.59*	11 January 2003	
325	Hollyhill Equity	17.57	12 January 2003	
325	Jamellas Phantom	17.38	26 January 2003	
350	Kilmalady Boy	18.49	25 September 2003	
350	Droopys Robinho	18.47	25 February 2007	
350	Royal Delight	18.39	1 January 2007	
350	Montos Mark	18.39	4 November 2007	
350	So Handsome	18.36	18 May 2008	
350	Mustangsteviegee	18.30	1 June 2008	
525	Top Note	29.55	1970	
525	Taxi Dancer	29.52	29 May 1971	
525	Palestine June	29.35	17 July 1975	
525	Marinas Crazy	29.18	18 August 1979	
525	Moss Chimes	29.09	30 May 1981	
525	Slaney Stan	29.09	3 July 1982	
525	Erins Eye	29.09	4 October 1986	
525	Fairhill Boy	28.92	15 July 1989	
525	Star Ambition	28.70	2 September 2001	
525	Farloe Bond	28.45	25 August 2002	
525	Homeless Jo	28.41	2 December 2007	
525	Barnish Ciaran	28.39	13 April 2008	
525	Graigues Toss	28.36	27 April 2008	
525	Rough Laura	28.25	13 September 2008	
550	Bowe Princess	31.08	17 April 1962	
550	Glencloy Swift	29.86	21 July 2001	
550	Fridays Rumble	29.74	21 July 2002	
550	Phoenix Paddy	29.71	11 February 2007	
550	Phoenix Paddy	29.68	25 February 2007	
550	Farloe Black	29.64	14 October 2007	
550	Farloe Black	29.39	28 October 2007	
550	College Causeway	29.31	26 October 2008	
575	Duel	32.46	11 May 1967	
575	Silent Rogue	32.35	6 August 1977	
575	Madam Black	32.25	24 August 1977	
575	Tour Valley	32.11	30 June 1979	
575	Coolbeg Carina	32.08	1988	
575	Saddleback Pearl	32.08	1988	
575	Irish Lad	31.90	1990	
575	Quare Whisper	31.87	22 June 1991	
575	Drumsna Isle	31.72	22 August 1999	
575	Tullymurry Token	31.47	27 July 2002	
575	Glenanore Pride	31.40	18 May 2003	
575	Jamies Boy	31.40	25 September 2003	
575	Cabbage White	31.28	13 November 2003	
575	Line Of Fire	31.05	7 October 2007	
600	Messan Mak	32.88	22 September 2002	
600	Always A Rumble	32.50	21 September 2003	
750	Mobile Dubh	42.17	21 March 2004	
750	Beaming Surprise	42.13	24 October 2004	
750	Lisnahavil Lady	42.11	30 April 2005	
750	Dromana Blue	41.72	25 February 2007	
750	Droopys Quiff	41.56	7 October 2007	
750	Droopys Quiff	41.38	5 October 2008	
780	Bowe Princess	45.10	19 May 1962	
790	Barrack Maid	45.03	17 August 1978	
790	Farloe Frown	44.92	4 August 2001	
820	Break Away Tiger	46.20	2 June 2002	
820	Recovery Mission	45.74	11 September 2003	
525 hurdles	Sefanta	29.48	8 August 2004	
550 H	Frisby For Me	30.87	10 October 2004	
550 hurdles	Lemon Rambo	30.81	28 November 2004	
