= Ó Droighneáin =

Ó Droighneáin, Gaelic-Irish surname.

== Background ==
Ó Droighneáin was a surname of at least two different septs, located in Counties Cork and Galway, but has been 'translated' as Thornton, an English surname. "[Thornton] is a portmanteau English name for Ó Draighneáin, Mac Sceacháin, Ó Toráin. The connection is: draighean, blackthorn; sceach, whitethorn; tor, a bush. MacLysaght remarks that some Thorntons in Limerick were 16 cent planters".

Ó Droighneáin remains in use as an Irish-language surname.

== People with the surname ==
- Micheál Ó Droigheaín, An Spidéal-born Irish Volunteer and IRA commander, 1889-1964
- Pádraig Thornton, alias Proinsias Ó Draighneáin, Drogheda-born member of IRB and Irish Volunteers, d. 1936
- Máirtín Ó Droighneáin, An Spidéal-born boxer, 1916–84
- Áine Ní Dhroighneáin, sean-nós singer and actor
- Máire Uí Droighneáin, Ros na Rún actor
- Eoin Ó Droighneáin, Irish socialist
- Muireann Ni Dhroighneain, actress
- Sailí Ní Dhroighneáin, sean-nós singer and musician, 2014 Fleadh Cheoil winner

== See also ==
- Kevin Thornton (chef), Tipperary-born chef
- Kevin Thornton (footballer)
- Michael Thornton (Medal of Honor, awarded 1884)
- Sean Thornton, Drogheda-born professional footballer
- Sean Thornton (The Quiet Man)
