= Kingdom Greyhound Stadium =

Greyhound racing venue in County Kerry, Ireland

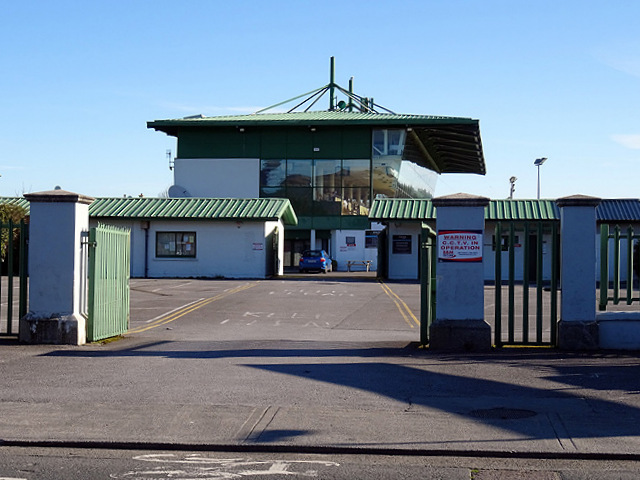
- The stadium entrance in 2016
- Location: Brewery Road, Tralee, County Kerry, Ireland
- Coordinates: 52°16′29.9″N 9°42′00.0″W
- Operated by: Greyhound Racing Ireland
- Date opened: 1930
- Race type: greyhound racing

Kingdom Greyhound Stadium is a greyhound racing track located in Tralee, County Kerry, Ireland. It has been known as Oakview Park and the Tralee Greyhound Stadium previously.

Racing takes place every Tuesday, Friday and Saturday evening and the facilities include a grandstand restaurant, fast food facilities, a number of bars, totalisator betting and seating. It also has a large car park around the stadium.

Race distances are 500, 525, 550, 570, and 750 yards and the feature competitions at the track are the Juvenile Classic and the Race of Champions.

== History ==
A track known as the Ardfert Greyhound track in Ardfert opened in August 1929 but closed the same year as a result of a larger track arriving in Oakview Village nearer to the Tralee town centre. Despite opposition from the local clergy, the first meeting was held on 9 April 1930 at Oakview Park and the circumference was 476 yards making for a nice comfortable course for the greyhounds.

The great Ballyhennessy Seal made his debut here in 1943 followed by Spanish Battleship, Ballymac Ball, Priceless Border and Patricias Hope, a quite remarkable list of greyhounds that graced the track over the years. In addition a series of competitions have been introduced over the years providing the Tralee public with regular annual events. The events were the Bloom 500, Harp Lager Stakes, Rose of Tralee, Clarke Cup, Kingdom Puppy Cup, Monalee Hiker Stakes and the MJ Hannafin Memorial Cup. The last mentioned event the MJ Hannafin Memorial Cup was named in memory of the Racing Manager at the track when it opened in 1930. His brothers to Jerry and Dennis Hannafin were two highly respected trainers in the industry.

MJ Hannafin was Racing Manager until 1950 and then the hot seat was taken up by Kevin Laide for over thirty years before John Ward took over.

At the turn of the 21st century, many Irish tracks received a boost from Greyhound Racing Ireland with refurbishment on the agenda. Tralee was no exception and underwent a major refit with the stadium redesigned for the new Millennium under the ownership of the Board.

Two new competitions the Juvenile Classic and Race of Champions have been introduced and they have quickly established themselves as leading feature events in the Irish racing calendar despite the fact that they have only been inaugurated in recent years. The stadium underwent further upgrading in 2012 following extra investment by Greyhound Racing Ireland.

In December 2023, the stadium renewed the contract agreement (as part of the GRI) with S.I.S for 2024.

== Competitions ==
- Juvenile Classic
- Race of Champions

== Track records ==
Current track records

Yards	Greyhound	Time (sec)	Date	Notes/ref
325	Flashing Willow	17.12	28 May 2022	
500	Magical Luka	26.61	20 June 2025	
525	In Good Time	27.91	4 May 2024	
550	Seven Beach	29.09	13 June 2024	Race of Champions final
570	Bobsleigh Dream	30.40	11 March 2022	
750	Tuono Charlie	40.76	27 July 2024	
525 hurdles	Cashen Zig	28.88	24 July 2009	

Former track records

Extended content

Yards	Greyhound	Time (sec)	Date	Notes/ref
315	Annaghs Pride	17.65	1950	
315	Lemond Laddie	17.45	8 May 1958	
315	Ballyard Dick	=17.45	8 May 1958	
325	Upourdat	17.95	20 May 1968	
325	Rosslyn Raider	17.90	8 March 1974	
325	Glamour Hobo	17.86	15 August 1984	
325	True Gold	17.84	1988	
325	Beau Amie	17.76	1988	
325	Mistreamer	17.72	September 1990	
325	Michigan Maurice	17.52	30 August 1991	
325	Pineapple Mandy	17.46	23 April 1999	
325	Cashen Malouda	17.40	30 June 2012	
325	Leeview Dave	17.36	18 June 2013	
325	Leeview Dave	17.24	21 June 2013	
325	Holborn Junior	17.23	17 May 2014	
325	Ballymac Sexton	17.17	27 May 2016	
500	Sugar Prince	28.55	22 July 1958	
500	What About Andy	27.76	March 1998	
500	Long Charlie	27.45	15 March 2002	
500	Annamore Derry	27.33	24 September 2004	
500	Scarty Lad	27.14	4 May 2007	
500	Mossend Ronnie	27.14	12 November 2010	
500	Hernandez	27.07	26 July 2011	
500	Characterbuildin	26.84	15 June 2012	
500	Beaming Mark	26.84	15 June 2012	
500	Daleroad Devon	26.70	6 September 2024	
500	Magical Luka	26.64	13 June 2025	
525	Roman Emperor	30.20	1950	
525	Pouleen Boy	30.20	1950	
525	Hobos Choice	30.20	1950	
525	Tellus	29.12	2 September 1964	
525	Up Early	29.12	29 April 1977	
525	Gina Girl	29.11	1978	
525	Buck Hall	28.92	1981	
525	Court Rain	28.90	17 August 1984	
525	Castleland Mac	28.69	26 September 1991	
525	Rocking Bob	28.41	29 August 1997	
525	Mountleader Rolf	28.27	29 November 2002	
525	Deerfield Mover	28.14	14 September 2004	
525	Deerfield Sings	28.11	1 July 2011	
525	Mind the Net	28.09	13 December 2003	
525	Quietly	28.08	13 June 2014	
525	Curious Boy	28.05	6 May 2016	
525	Ballinabola Ed	28.03	11 March 2022	Con & Annie Kirby Memorial Trial Stake
525	Daleroad Duke	27.92	8 December 2023	
550	Another High Jack	31.10	16 May 1960	
550	Footless	=31.10	16 May 1960	
550	Harpist	30.76	16 July 1976	
550	Orange Prince	30.72	1979	
550	Attractive Lad		1980	
550	Killaclug Jet	30.52	1980	
550	Realtins Best	30.40	29 April 1983	
550	Ardfert Sean	30.18	2 December 1988	
550	Cape Prince	29.78	28 July 1995	
550	Annamore Billy	29.70	30 July 2002	
550	Goldstar Premier	29.64	20 May 2005	
550	Melodys Pat	29.62	6 June 2008	
550	Dromore Dazzler	29.61	8 October 2010	
550	Deerfield Music	29.52	17 June 2011	
550	Farloe Trent	29.43	21 June 2013	Race of Champions
550	Native Chimes	29.40	9 June 2017	Race of Champions semi final
550	Good News	29.34	9 June 2017	Race of Champions semi final
550	Explosive Boy	29.22	12 June 2021	Race of Champions semi final
550	Dashing Toro	29.20	7 June 2024	
550	Cheque For Cash	29.20	6 June 2024	
550	Seven Beach	29.15	6 June 2024	
570	Sirius	31.34	8 April 1969	
570	Wise Commander	31.14	26 September 1996	
570	Three Hells Bells	30.88	17 June 2003	
570	Green Heat	30.75	30 August 2008	
570	Raparee Polly	30.62	17 February 2009	
570	Toms Brett	30.62	30 June 2012	
600	Glittering Smack	33.65	1960	
750	Slow Motion	42.40	29 May 1981	
750	Easter Tidings	42.15	25 May 1999	
750	I'm Only Sal	42.06	10 December 2004	
750	Sahara Abbey	42.03	4 June 2005	
750	Iflookscouldkill	41.88	8 December 2006	
750	Iflookscouldkill	41.79	21 July 2007	
750	Shakira Live	41.70	2 January 2009	
750	Zulu Ella	41.60	17 July 2009	
812	Kertogue Sarah	45.90	22 July 1983	
525 H	Nervy Peggy	30.68	30 June 1961	
525 H	Ballyard Hurdler	29.85	18 August 1973	
525 H	Keen Captain	29.32	16 September 2003	
525 H	Queen Christine	29.21	4 June 2005	
