= Micheál Ó Droigheaín =

Micheál Ó Droigheaín (1889–1964), Irish national school teacher and Brigadier of the South Connemara Brigade, Irish Republican Army, fl. 1916–1922.

Ó Droigheaín's family lived at Gate Lodge, Bearna, County Galway, on an estate held by the Blake family (see The Tribes of Galway). He was interned in Frongoch after participating in the Galway Easter Rising of 1916. Following his release he became commandant in 1919, and retained this position following the reorganisation of the Connemara units by Richard Mulcahy in September 1920.

His property was among those attacked and burned in the Barna area as reprisal for the kidnapping and killing of Patrick W. Joyce (teacher) by the unit for spying. Joyce's body was buried in a bog and only discovered in 1998.

In 1922, the Earl of Westmeath, who had inherited the Blake estate, sold the house and nine acres to Ó Droigheaín.

Ó Droigheaín was the one time manager of the Galway Greyhound Stadium.

== See also ==
- Joe Togher
- Ó Droighneáin
