= Brixton Greyhound Stadium =

Greyhound racing stadium in Brixton, London

- Location: Brixton, London
- Coordinates: 51°28′01″N 0°06′50″W
- Opened: 1932
- Closed: pre 1939

Brixton Greyhound Stadium was a greyhound racing stadium in Brixton, London.

== Origins ==
Brixton Greyhound stadium was a short lived greyhound racing stadium which was built extremely quickly from early June until late August 1932.

The site chosen for the build was in a built up area off the Brixton Road at the junction of Knowle Road. The official address was 344 Brixton Road and the construction of the stadium also brought about a new school, shops and flats to Angell Town and the Brixton Road.

== Opening ==
The original plan to open during August 1932 was delayed by one month and the official opening night was on Saturday 10 September 1932. A maximum capacity crowd of four thousand people attended with a further two thousand spectators refused admittance. The 'house full' signs were posted well before the scheduled 8pm start in both the cheap enclosure (one shilling, two pence) and the more expensive two shillings, four pence enclosure. The electric floodlighting was a much discussed topic throughout the Stadium Club terrace and it was also noted that residents in the top floor flats in Knowle Road were watching with field glasses and the Brixton Road residents were hanging out of the upper windows to gain a view.

The seven race card featured races over 400 yards and the track was affiliated to the British Greyhound Tracks Control Society (BGTCS), the larger National Greyhound Racing Society. The first winner was 'Ballinadrimna' in a time of 27.90 secs. The chairman of the company was Sir Francis Curtis and he presented the silver cups and cash awards to all of the winners.

== History ==
Further meetings were held on the Monday, Wednesday and Thursday overseen by the Racing Manager J.J.Compton formerly of Reading and Arms Park stadiums. There was no room for resident kennels in the immediate vicinity so therefore the greyhounds were kept at Bombers Farm on the Grays Road in Westerham, Kent nearly twenty miles away. In December 1932 the track like many others at the time suffered totalisator problems with the authorities investigating the use of the tote on course following legislation that had banned them.

Notable boxing matches were hosted by the stadium in the 1930s before the BGTCS disbanded in 1935 which resulted in the stadium operating as an independent track.

== Closure ==
The exact date of closure is unknown but it did close before World War II. Brixton suffered considerable bomb damage including one bomb that fell adjacent to the stadium in Knowle Road. After the war the stadium was demolished and many of the nearby slums were cleared making way for council houses. The site became a depot before the St Helens School was constructed there. The track would have existed on part of the school and the Bedwell House flats opposite Villa Road and Max Roach Park.
