= 1983 English Greyhound Derby =

- Location: White City Stadium
- Start date: 21 May
- End date: 25 June
- Total prize money: £25,000 (winner)

The 1983 Daily Mirror Greyhound Derby took place during May and June with the final being held on 25 June 1983 at White City Stadium. The winner was I'm Slippy and the winning owner John Quinn received £25,000. The competition was sponsored by the Daily Mirror.

== Final result ==
At White City (over 500 metres):

| Position | Name of Greyhound | Breeding | Trap | SP | Time | Trainer |
|---|---|---|---|---|---|---|
| 1st | I'm Slippy | Laurdella Fun - Glenroe Bess | 4 | 6-1 | 29.40 | Barbara Tompkins (Coventry) |
| 2nd | On Spec | Blushing Spy - On Pot | 3 | 33-1 | 29.42 | Harry Crapper (Sheffield) |
| 3rd | Debbycot Lad | Liberty Lad - Knockshe Hopeful | 5 | 3-1 | 29.45 | Cyril Morris (Ireland) |
| 4th | Game Ball | Sand Man - Stay In Business | 2 | 1-1f | 29.49 | Sean Bourke (Ireland) |
| 5th | Real Miller | Greenane Decca - Real Glory | 1 | 25-1 | 29.55 | Ken Muse (Private) |
| 6th | Amazing Man | Glen Rock - Orchard Robin | 6 | 9-2 | 29.77 | Derek Knight (Hove) |

=== Distances ===
head, neck, ½, ¾, 2¾ (lengths)
The distances between the greyhounds are in finishing order and shown in lengths. One length is equal to 0.08 of one second.

== Competition Report ==
The Daily Mirror took over sponsorship of the event from Spillers; they had already sponsored the Grand National and Puppy Oaks. There were 213 entries and topping the ante-post lists were Game Ball trained by Irishman Sean Bourke and Scurry Gold Cup champion Yankee Express.

Heavy rain produced slow times on the opening night with Yankee Express recording 30.37. With the qualifying round being held over four nights the going improved dramatically and Game Ball won in 29.43. Game Ball was then defeated by Whisper Wishes in round one but both qualified. The second round saw the field down to 48 and Game Ball produced the fastest heat win. Long Spell and Yankee Express both won but Whisper Wishes made it no further after being badly bumped.

The quarter-finals provided two very strong heats, Game Ball and Yankee Express were drawn together in heat two and the final heat contained Debbycot Lad, I'm Slippy and Long Spell. Amazing Man won heat one before Yankee Express missed the break and found trouble in heat two and would take no further part in the Derby. Game Ball only finished second behind 50-1 shot Lisnamuck. The third heat went to On Spec and the final heat was claimed by I'm Slippy with Long Spell going out after encountering crowding.

Game Ball moved into the final after clinching his semifinal from Debbycott Lad and On Spec. The 9-4 joint favourites Amazing Man and I'm Slippy went neck and neck in the second semi before Amazing Man claimed the race.

Game Ball lined up for the final as the evens money favourite and made a moderate start unlike I'm Slippy who was very fast away. There was crowding at the first bend but Debbycott Lad and On Spec showed enough pace to sit behind the leader, as they approached the third bend the race was wide open. Five of the six greyhounds passed the line together with I'm Slippy just holding on in a photo-finish.

== Quarter-finals ==
Heat 1 (June 16)
| Pos | Name | SP | Time |
|---|---|---|---|
| 1st | Amazing Man | 11-10f | 29.86 |
| 2nd | East Bound | 11-2 | 29.88 |
| 3rd | Evelyn Turbo | 7-2 | 29.96 |
| 4th | Huberts shade | 5-1 | 30.52 |
| 5th | Rikasso Hiker | 16-1 | 31.56 |
| 6th | Bright Pin | 15-2 | 31.96 |

Heat 2 (June 16)
| Pos | Name | SP | Time |
|---|---|---|---|
| 1st | Lisnamuck | 50-1 | 29.61 |
| 2nd | Game Ball | 11-8 | 29.73 |
| 3rd | Hay Maker Mack | 12-1 | 29.79 |
| 4th | Yankee Express | 1-1f | 29.99 |
| 5th | Copper Beeches | 10-1 | 30.03 |
| 6th | Darkie Fli | 20-1 | 30.27 |

Heat 3 (June 16)
| Pos | Name | SP | Time |
|---|---|---|---|
| 1st | On Spec | 10-1 | 29.92 |
| 2nd | Gracious | 3-1 | 30.10 |
| 3rd | Real Miller | 25-1 | 30.11 |
| 4th | Caribbean Spice | 11-4 | 30.17 |
| 5th | Hilville Flyer | 1-1f | 30.21 |
| 6th | Willow Jack | 25-1 | 30.22 |

Heat 4 (June 16)
| Pos | Name | SP | Time |
|---|---|---|---|
| 1st | I'm Slippy | 4-1 | 29.87 |
| 2nd | Speedy Hope | 9-2 | 29.93 |
| 3rd | Debbycot Lad | 2-1f | 30.01 |
| 4th | Long Spell | 3-1 | 30.05 |
| 5th | The Stranger | 7-2 | 30.09 |
| N/R | Ballyknock Amy | | |

== Semifinals ==
First Semifinal (Jun 18)
| Pos | Name of Greyhound | SP | Time | Trainer |
|---|---|---|---|---|
| 1st | Game Ball | 5-4f | 29.42 | Bourke |
| 2nd | Debbycot Lad | 2-1 | 29.48 | Morris |
| 3rd | On Spec | 33-1 | 29.66 | Crapper |
| 4th | Hay Maker Mack | 9-2 | 29.67 | Knight |
| 5th | Gracious | 16-1 | 29.85 | Murray |
| 6th | East Bound | 12-1 | 29.88 | Murray |

Second Semifinal (Jun 18)
| Pos | Name of Greyhound | SP | Time | Trainer |
|---|---|---|---|---|
| 1st | Amazing Man | 9-4jf | 29.64 | Knight |
| 2nd | I'm Slippy | 9-4jf | 29.68 | Tompkins |
| 3rd | Real Miller | 33-1 | 29.74 | Muse |
| 4th | Evelyn Turbo | 8-1 | 29.84 | Black |
| 5th | Speedy Hope | 4-1 | 30.18 | Murray |
| 6th | Lisnamuck | 4-1 | 30.19 | Milligan |

== Supporting Races ==
Five track records fell on the Derby final night including that of the Derby distance when Hay Maker Mack won the English Greyhound Derby Invitation and became the first ever dog to break the 29-second barrier, posting 28.95 sec. Hay Maker Mack had won a Derby heat before being knocked out and his racing career ended soon afterwards, when he sustained a broken hock during the Essex Vase at Romford. The other four track records were; Pagan Pansy 29.88 (500 metres hurdles), Sir Winston 30.38 (500 metres chase), Ceili Lass 40.75 (680 metres) and Minnis Matador 43.82 (730 metres).

== See also ==
- 1983 UK & Ireland Greyhound Racing Year
