= Tsesarevich (disambiguation) =

Tsesarevich (sometimes transliterated as Cesarevich or Caesarevich) was the title of the heir apparent or heir presumptive to the emperors of Russia.

Tsesarevich may also refer to:

- Cesarewitch Handicap, a British horse race
- Russian battleship Tsesarevich, a Russian battleship
