= New Writtle Street Stadium =

Former sports venue in Chelmsford, England

- Interactive map of New Writtle Street Stadium
- Location: Chelmsford, Essex
- Coordinates: 51°43′52″N 0°27′56″E
- Owner: Chelmsford City F.C.
- Surface: Grass

Construction
- Opened: 7 February 1925
- Closed: August 1997
- Demolished: 1999

New Writtle Street Stadium was a football and short lived greyhound racing stadium located in Chelmsford, Essex, adjacent to the Essex County Cricket Club ground.

== Origins ==
The stadium was constructed on spare land on the north side of New Writtle Street in 1922.

== Football ==
Chelmsford moved into New Writtle Street in 1925, playing their inaugural game against West Ham United reserves on 7 February 1925.

The football club continued to play at the New Writtle Street ground following the formation of Chelmsford City as a professional entity, which the club purchased in 1939. During the early parts of World War II the ground was shared by Southend United, before it became a barrage balloon site in 1942. The record attendance of 16,807 was set for a local derby with Colchester United on 10 September 1949. Floodlights were installed in 1960 and several plans were made to increase facilities at the ground, including installing a swimming pool and building office blocks or a hotel, but none came to fruition. The club's first floodlit game was against Wisbech Town on 21 September 1960, with the official opening coming in a friendly against Norwich City on 3 October 1960. During the 1963–64 season, the club declared the capacity of New Writtle Street to be 25,000, after investing over £40,000 into the stadium during the previous four years.

In 1997, the site was sold to developers and the club had to move out of Chelmsford, initially moving to Maldon Town's Wallace Binder Ground, before moving to Billericay Town's New Lodge in January 1998. The club returned back to Chelmsford in January 2006, taking up tenancy at the Melbourne Stadium. Chelmsford's final game at New Writtle Street was a 2–0 win against Clevedon Town on 16 August 1997. A housing estate now occupies the site.

== Greyhound racing ==
On 23 September 1927, the London and Provincial Greyhound Racing Company bought land in Chelmsford to build a track, but stiff opposition resulted and the planned construction failed to materialise. However, on the 20 May 1932 the Mid-Essex Greyhound Racing Club raced for the first time at the stadium on New Writtle Street, home to Chelmsford Football Club and next door to the County Cricket Ground.

One year later, director AH Bradbury-Pratt began regular racing on Monday, Wednesday, Friday and Saturday evenings over 440 and 550 yards. The racing continued irregularly during the years 1935 to 1937 before finishing. A second spell of racing was submitted for planning by promoter Flight-Lieut CR Thomas in March 1946, finally starting in 1949 but once again the racing only lasted a few years. On both occasions the racing was independent (not affiliated to the sports governing body the National Greyhound Racing Club).

Between 1976 and 1978 prolonged plans to bring greyhound racing to the stadium failed.
