= Hawthorn Greyhound Track =

Welsh greyhound racing track

- Location: Fairfield Lane, Pontypridd, Rhondda Cynon Taf, Wales
- Coordinates: 51°34′56.3″N 3°18′38.0″W
- Opened: 1932
- Closed: 1970s

The Hawthorn Greyhound Track was a former greyhound racing track in Pontypridd, Rhondda Cynon Taf, Wales.

The stadium was situated on Fairfield Lane off Cardiff Road and on the south side of the Rhyd-y-Felin railway branch (now the A470). Racing began in March 1932 and ended in 1970s with the site now being a football ground used by Rhydyfelin AFC and is called the old dog track.
