= Greyhound Racing Ireland =

Regulator and promoter of greyhound racing in Ireland

- Formerly: Bord na gCon (1958–2020)
- Industry: Sporting governing body
- Founded: 1958
- Headquarters: Dock Road, Limerick, Ireland
- Website: grireland.ie

Greyhound Racing Ireland (GRI) (Irish: Rásaíocht Con Éireann, formerly Irish: Bord na gCon, the Irish Greyhound Board) is an Irish commercial semi-state body charged with regulating and promoting greyhound racing in Ireland. The organisation has been active in developing the sport in Ireland since its founding on 11 July 1958.

The body reports to the Department of Agriculture, Food and the Marine.

== History ==
The original governing body for Irish greyhound racing was established under the Greyhound Industry Act of 1958, with a number of aims. The body was formed to regulate the industry, operate a tote betting system, licence and authorise each stadium, its officials, and its on-course bookmakers, and promote the sport through advertising and prize grants. It became responsible for all tracks in Ireland, with the exception of the Ulster tracks that would remain under the jurisdiction of the Irish Coursing Club.

Rásaíocht Con Éireann / Greyhound Racing Ireland report on the results of Northern Irish tracks, of which two remain today: Derry Greyhound Stadium and Drumbo Park. The reason for the involvement is because Northern Irish tracks do not come under the jurisdiction of the Greyhound Board of Great Britain (GBGB), however the tracks do not receive funding or licensing from Greyhound Racing Ireland.

In 1960, a new totalisator system was installed at four tracks: Harolds Cross, Shelbourne Park, Cork and Limerick, in addition to obtaining Clonmel from the Morris family headed by T.A.Morris, the former secretary of the Irish Coursing Club. Des Hanrahan became chairman of Bord na gCon in 1965 (taking over from Dr Paddy Maguire) and actively sought to buy any Irish tracks in danger of being sold to developers. They bought Shelbourne Park in 1968.

Bord na gCon/ Irish Greyhound Board officially changed its name to Rásaíocht Con Éireann/ Greyhound Racing Ireland on 1 October 2020 as part of the implementation of the Greyhound Racing Act 2019. The provisions enacted provide for an expanded Governing Board of nine members as well as laying the foundation for a new traceability system for racing greyhounds, enhanced powers for authorised officers, a more robust and modern regulatory framework, and ultimately the updating of racing sanctions to be administered by an independent Control Committee and an Appeal Committee, the members of which will be appointed by the Minister following an open selection process.

== Irish Greyhound Care Fund ==
In August 2019, it was announced that a separate Care Fund dedicated to funding a variety of initiatives for the care and welfare of the greyhound was being established.

The Greyhound Care Fund is a fund that is dedicated to funding a variety of initiative for the care and welfare of the greyhound and the GRI is targeting the sum of €1 million to be raised for the Greyhound Care Fund in its first year of operation. The fund will accrue from the admissions and restaurant packages, a percentage of tote income and sponsorship. Care Fund arrangements for Shelbourne Park were brought into effect from 21 August 2019 and other stadia came into effect from 1 November 2019.

== Racing venues ==
Greyhound Racing Ireland regulates all of Ireland's greyhound racing venues. There are racing venues in the following locations:

Connacht

- Galway, Galway Greyhound Stadium

Leinster

- Dublin, Shelbourne Park
- Dundalk, Dundalk Stadium
- Enniscorthy, Enniscorthy Greyhound Stadium
- Kilkenny, Kilkenny Greyhound Stadium
- Mullingar, Mullingar Greyhound Stadium
- Newbridge, Newbridge Greyhound Stadium

Munster

- Clonmel, Clonmel Greyhound Stadium
- Cork, Curraheen Park
- Limerick, Limerick Greyhound Stadium
- Thurles, Thurles Greyhound Stadium
- Tralee, Kingdom Greyhound Stadium
- Waterford, Kilcohan Park
- Youghal, Youghal Greyhound Stadium

Ulster

- Lifford, Lifford Greyhound Stadium

== See also ==
- Greyhound racing in Ireland
- Greyhound racing in the United Kingdom
- Horse Racing Ireland
- State-sponsored bodies of the Republic of Ireland
