= Dover and District Greyhound Stadium =

Greyhound racing stadium in Dover, Kent, England

- Interactive map of Dover and District Greyhound Stadium
- Location: Willow Walk Meadow, Buckland, Dover, England
- Coordinates: 51°08′11″N 01°17′53″E

Construction
- Opened: 1932
- Closed: 1935

Dover and District Greyhound Stadium was a greyhound racing stadium located on what was Willow Walk Meadow, Buckland, Dover (modern day Alfred Road).

The opening two meetings were held on 26 December 1932 and were not affiliated with the National Greyhound Racing Club). The venue struggled to attract good attendances and underwent several changes of management.

In 1935 the latest proprietor Reginald Smith was declared bankrupt and the stadium and Willow Walk Meadow became new housing.
