= Welling Stadium =

Greyhound stadium in London, England

Welling Greyhound Stadium
- Location: Wickham Street, Welling, South East London
- Coordinates: 51°28′17.6″N 0°06′13.6″E
- Opened: 1932
- Closed: 1937

Welling Stadium was a greyhound racing stadium located on the west side of Wickham Street in Welling, South East London It is not to be confused with a football ground that existed to the east of the stadium and was situated on the east and south sides of Wickham Street.

== Greyhound racing ==
A greyhound track was constructed at the rear of East Wickham House with an application to build a stand in 1932. The track was opened on 28 October 1932 by proprietor M J Mortimore and East Wickham House also owned by the Mortimore family was used as a clubhouse and bar. The racing was independent (not affiliated to the sports governing body the National Greyhound Racing Club).

== Closure ==
The stadium closed due to a council closure order in 1937.
