= Shirebrook Stadium =

Greyhound racing stadium

- Location: Sookholme Road/Portland Road, Shirebrook, north-east Derbyshire
- Coordinates: 53°12′06″N 1°12′36″W
- Opened: 1932
- Closed: c.1961

Shirebrook Stadium was a greyhound racing stadium located on the north side of Sookholme Road and the south side of Portland Road in Shirebrook, north-east Derbyshire.

== Origins ==
The stadium was originally the local White Swan football ground which was situated next door to Ashbourne Farm.

== Greyhound racing ==
A greyhound track was constructed by the Shirebrook Greyhound Racing Company around the football ground to serve the local mining community. The stadium opened on 30 July 1932 and was independent (not affiliated to the sports governing body the National Greyhound Racing Club). Handicap races were popular and the track also held an unusual form of seven dog racing. The track continued to trade through World War II and had totalisator facilities to bet on the races over 230, 300 and 400 yards.

== Closure ==
The stadium closed around 1961.
