= Enniscorthy Greyhound Stadium =

Greyhound racing venue in County Wexford, Ireland

- Location: Show Grounds, Ross Road, Enniscorthy, County Wexford, Ireland
- Coordinates: 52°30′00.5″N 6°34′36.7″W
- Operated by: Enniscorthy Greyhound Racing Company Limited
- Date opened: 1933
- Race type: greyhound racing

Enniscorthy Greyhound Stadium is a greyhound racing track located on the west side of Enniscorthy, County Wexford, Ireland.

Racing takes place every Monday and Thursday evening and race distances are 350, 525, 550, 575, and 600 yards. The track is described as a wide galloping track with a sharp rise from the last bend to the winning line. The feature competition at the track is the Red Mills Future Champion Unraced Stake.

== History ==
Although racing officially started on 3 August 1933 there was sporadic racing earlier at this venue. Eight businessmen got together and formed the track. The first directors were Denis O’Brien, James McCrea, William Stamp and Tim Larkin, in addition Doctor Bowen, P.J.O’L James McCrea, William Stamp and Tim Larkin, in addition Doctor Bowen, P.J.O’Loughlin, R McCrea helped found the track. Race nights for many years were on Monday and Thursday evenings and the racing and betting market remains as one of the strongest despite the remote location.

Board membership has been family affair over the years with ties to the original board members such as Paul McCrea, Mary Stamp, Harry Larkin, Billy Stamp, Barbara Teehan and Mary Nolan, the latter two are grand-daughters of Denis O’Brien and Tim Larkin respectively. Another relation the late Kay Prendergast (daughter of O’Brien) was a director and Ireland's first female timekeeper.

The Racing Managers over the years have been Pat White, Peter Agnew, Sean McCrea, John McCrea and Stephen Cullen. The main races run at the track have been the Grand Prize, the Leinster Puppy Cup, Wexford Leger and more recently the Future Champion Unraced Stake. There have been many famous greyhounds to appear here; Mile Bush Pride and Palms Printer both began their careers at Enniscorthy as did the greyhounds with the Monalee prefix.

== Track records ==
=== Current ===
Yards	Greyhound	Time	Date	Notes
350	Montos Mark	18.50	27 September 2007	
525	Cushie Concorde	28.38	17 April 2022	
550	Large Mac	29.83	22 June 2006	
550	Marked Urgent	=29.83	22 October 2009	
575	Kanasef	31.11	21 October 2010	
600	Rossa Baby	32.25	30 July 2009	
750	Coolemount Glen	42.13	16 September 2010	
830	Todays Gold Bars	46.71	26 October 2014	

=== Former track records ===
Extended content

Yards	Greyhound	Time	Date	Notes
325	Carlow Printer	18.15	1950	
325	Pleasure Flight	18.05	16 May 1957	
325	No Play	=18.05	2 May 1957	
350	Greenpark Fox	18.85	11 September 1989	
350	Luggers Speedy	18.57	1 September 1994	
350	Its Awesome	18.59	12 September 2002	
500	Precious Princess	28.70	24 July 1958	
525	Carlow Joe	30.00	1950	
525	Knockreigh	29.70	21 May 1964	
525	Cross Mistress	29.50	20 May 1965	
525	Rail Ship	29.20	16 August 1973	
525	Rail Ship	29.20	30 August 1973	
525	Supreme Blue	29.20	15 August 1974	
525	Hillville Harry	29.20	2 October 1975	
525	Milebush Swiftie	29.15	25 August 1983	
525	Kilcannon Hero	29.10	16 June 1988	
525	Young Tornado	29.13	5 July 2001	
525	Sir Pro	28.78	16 August 2001	
525	Tamna Rose	28.63	1 November 2001	
525	Business Success	28.63	30 May 2002	
525	Express Ego	28.59	29 October 2006	
525	Move On Byway	28.58	6 September 2007	
525	Whitefort Bomber	28.57	30 September 2007	
525	Hillcroft Josie	28.51	14 August 2008	
525	Rossa Baby	28.40	10 August 2009	
550	Kuadza	31.68	1950	
550	Quick Thought	30.80	1973	
550	Millies Express	30.70	27 June 1974	
550	Monalee King	30.60	24 June 1975	Wexford Leger heats
550	Yellow Band	30.60	22 May 1978	
550	Tinnock Supreme	30.40	24 May 1982	
550	Dereen Star	30.40	15 June 1989	
550	Castleboro Katie	30.18	11 July 2002	
550	Bring Your Own	30.10	12 August 2004	
550	Disco Boy	29.97	2 March 2000	
575	Gobstopper	31.43	30 October 2005	
575	Tain Lawn	31.31	28 September 2006	
575	Slick Sand	31.22	7 June 2007	
600	Get Going	33.40	28.11.1974	
600	Just It	33.55	12 September 1981	
600	Dryland Sailor	33.55	29 August 1985	
600	Kiltrea Celt	33.24	7 October 1991	
600	Heavenly Duchess	32.67	19 July 2001	
600	Durrow Prince	32.67	23 August 2001	
600	Smooth Rhythm	32.59	27 July 2006	
600	Rossa Baby	32.54	19 July 2009	
750	Hesmine Notyours	42.32	8 December 2005	
750	Paddys Wigwam	42.27	24 April 2006	
750	Wilcos Mate	42.24	29 October 2006	
830	Metric Tiger	46.81	30 August 2001	
830	Almost Jet In	46.81	5 August 2004	
1005	Getwhoyoulike	58.14	15 October 2001	
325 H	Millugh Fairy	18.78	1950	
325 H	Palms Sonny	18.55	11 October 1956	
325 H	Fitzs Chariot	=18.55	11 October 1956	
500 H	Next Round	29.55	6 May 1968	
525 H	You Dropout	31.40	1947	
525 H	Dogstown Fame	30.60	3 August 1967	
