= Clonmel Greyhound Stadium =

Greyhound racing venue in County Tipperary, Ireland

- Interactive map of Clonmel Greyhound Stadium
- Location: Davis Road, Clonmel, County Tipperary, Ireland
- Coordinates: 52.353344°N 7.692148°W
- Date opened: 1931
- Race type: greyhound racing

Clonmel Greyhound Stadium is a greyhound racing track located in Clonmel, County Tipperary, Ireland.

Racing takes place every Friday and Sunday evening and the facilities include a grandstand restaurant, fast food facilities, a number of bars, totalisator betting and seating.

Race distances are 300, 525, 550, 575, 790 and 1,015 yards and the feature competition at the track is the National Produce Stakes.

== Competitions ==
current and former

- National Produce Stakes
- Oaks
- St Leger

== History ==
=== Opening ===
The first race held at Clonmel took place on 20 March 1931. The track is situated on the Old Waterford Road just off Davis Road and is also the headquarters of the Irish Coursing Club (ICC). The ICC moved into the town of Clonmel in 1921 and the secretary Tom Morris became the first managing director of the greyhound racecourse. In 1931 the Horse Show Society agreed with the Greyhound Racing Club of Clonmel to lease the grounds for £250 per year. The Racing Manager was Tim Rice and the circuit was 480 yards in circumference running the standard main distance of 525 yards.

The Oaks was held here in 1932 and the Clonmel public were lucky to see the magnificent bitch Queen of the Suir win the race. The following year the track was selected to host both the Oaks and St Leger. The running of the Irish St Leger was the one and only time at the track and resulted in a victory for the legendary Brilliant Bob. The May 1931 whelp was introduced to track racing in 1933 and after finishing runner-up in the Easter Cup won the St Leger over 550 yards in 31.53.

The premier racing event to be held at Clonmel would be the National Sapling Stakes (which would become the National Breeders Produce Stakes). The first running was in 1939 and was claimed by Sporting Fancy. A year later in 1940 Tanist became the first greyhound to break 30 seconds at Clonmel recording 29.85 over 525 yards. The track renamed the National Sapling Stakes to the National Puppy Cup before it became the National Breeders Produce Stakes in 1947.

=== Post War ===
The next milestone came in 1946 when in the second round of the National Puppy Cup a greyhound called Quare Times clocked an amazing 29.75sec to set a new track record. In 1947 the ICC moved into new headquarters so that they could administer the sport in addition to housing 'The Sporting Press' a newspaper owned by the ICC. The struggling racecourse known as Powerstown Park had also been acquired by the ICC which used the venue for coursing inside the horse racing circuit. They retained some horse racing meetings maintaining the Park as a going concern.

The track would come under the control of the Bord na gCon in 1960 that purchased the track from the Morris family. There were no major developments over the next couple of decades except for the introduction of a new event called the Munster Cup and the 1979 retirement of Christy Mulcahy the Racing Manager. One event that was not welcome was the regular flooding of the track from the nearby River Suir.

In 1986, the track was closed to allow a complete renovation with the re-opening in spring 1987, the track underwent major changes as well going all-sand and introducing the controversial Australian Noel Bramwich hare. The track improvements changed the expected times recorded and Balalika set a new track record of 28.68 over 525 yards on a circumference of 593 yards.

The lease for Clonmel was bought out by the Clonmel Leisure Group from the Bord na gCon in 1991 but the track closed down in 1998 following an ongoing dispute over the lease and freehold agreements between the Clonmel Leisure Group and the Clonmel Agricultural Show.

=== Recent history ===
In 2000 it was hoped that a new track could be constructed at Powerstown Park. Meetings were held between the Irish Coursing Club (tenants at Powerstown Park), the Irish Greyhound Board, the Tipperary County Council, Government Minister Noel Davern, and Clonmel's Mayor, Tom Ambrose but the problems continued and a solution was not found. Eventually it was agreed that the greyhound track section of the showgrounds would be sold to the Davis Road Greyhound Racing Company.

Before re-opening in 2003 the stadium was upgraded and modernised signalling a new start with Red Mills becoming sponsors of the National Produce Stakes and Barry Coleman becoming Racing Manager. The former Racing Manager Gus Ryan retired in 2009 after 42 years in racing.

In 2012, Clonmel earned contributions from Greyhound Racing Ireland and received a €1 million investment allowing the owners to knock down the old stand and rebuild a new modern grandstand.

In 2023, the stadium announced a contract agreement (as part of the GRI) with S.I.S regarding the broadcasting rights of the racing.

== Track records ==
Current

| Yards | Greyhound | Time (sec) | Date | Notes/ref |
|---|---|---|---|---|
| 300 | Calling Spice | 15.81 | 1 February 2011 | |
| 525 | Clares Rocket | 27.87 | 1 May 2016 | |
| 550 | Ardera Freya | 29.58 | 23 June 2024 | |
| 575 | Compass Smash | 31.03 | 5 October 2008 | |
| 750 | Kiltrea Kev | 41.10 | 29 August 2010 | |
| 790 | Volcano | 43.66 | 7 February 2015 | |
| 1015 | Ferdia Bound | 57.78 | 10 October 2010 | |

Former

Extended content

1937 track record holder Monarch Of All was sold for a record price at the time of 350 guineas at the Harold's Cross Stadium sales.

| Yards | Greyhound | Time (sec) | Date | Notes/ref |
|---|---|---|---|---|
| 300 | Quiet Spring | 16.50 | 14 May 1970 | |
| 300 | Im Game | 16.54* | 27 April 1987 | |
| 300 | Greenpark Fox | =16.34 | January 1989 | |
| 300 | Greenpark Fox | 16.12 | 1 February 1989 | |
| 300 | Marshals Music | 16.25* | 7 August 2003 | |
| 300 | Derwent Storm | 16.21 | 18 January 2004 | |
| 300 | Droopys Hughes | 16.15 | 5 February 2004 | |
| 300 | Run for Alice | 16.08 | 1 May 2005 | |
| 300 | Rising Fire | 16.04 | 16 July 2006 | |
| 300 | Rising Fire | 16.01 | 24 August 2006 | |
| 300 | Unique Option | 15.95 | 12 November 2006 | |
| 300 | Toms Zorro | 15.94 | 14 January 2007 | |
| 300 | Four Dubs | 15.94 | 1 April 2007 | |
| 300 | Rising Fire | 15.89 | 22 April 2007 | |
| 300 | Rising Fire | 15.85 | 29 April 2007 | |
| 330 | Brilliant Tulip | 18.30 | 1950 | |
| 500 | Odd Venture | 28.25 | 18 May 1961 | |
| 525 | Tanist | 29.85 | 1940 | |
| 525 | Quare Times | 29.75 | 1946 | |
| 525 | Barna Derg | 29.65 | 1950 | |
| 525 | The Grand Fire | 29.40 | 25 April 1957 | |
| 525 | The Potman | 29.34 | September 1979 | |
| 525 | Game Ball | 29.22 | April 1983 | Produce Stakes semi-final |
| 525 | Balalika | 28.68* | 8 April 1987 | |
| 525 | Arrancourt Duke | 28.38 | 13 April 1989 | Produce Stake semi-final |
| 525 | Vintage Prince | 28.55* | 29 May 1995 | |
| 525 | College Prime | 28.60 | 6 April 2003 | |
| 525 | Velvet Cash | 28.54 | 17 March 2004 | |
| 525 | Charity Jack | 28.36 | 5 March 2006 | |
| 525 | St Louis Spirit | 28.33 | 5 April 2009 | Produce Stakes first round |
| 525 | Ardera Power | 28.29 | 12 April 2009 | Produce Stakes second round |
| 525 | Shaneboy Lee | 28.24 | 12 April 2009 | Produce Stakes second round |
| 525 | Colorful Champ | 28.23 | 25 October 2009 | |
| 525 | Amazing Dude | =28.23 | 31 May 2015 | |
| 550 | Flighty Rover | 31.30 | 1950 | |
| 550 | Mad Mac | 30.50* | 15 June 1987 | |
| 550 | Fiddlers Wish | 30.04 | 31 January 1989 | |
| 550 | Meet Me Halfway | 29.80 | 1 August 1989 | |
| 550 | Man of Lamancha | 30.02* | 4 February 2003 | |
| 550 | Toms Little Jo | 29.88 | 3 June 2004 | |
| 550 | Swahili Eile | 29.85 | 16 February 2007 | |
| 550 | Off the Fags | 29.81 | 6 July 2007 | |
| 550 | Leahs Boss | 29.81 | 8 October 2008 | |
| 550 | Mardocs Heinze | 29.63 | 12 October 2008 | |
| 550 | Mahogany Rumble | 29.63 | 12 July 2009 | |
| 550 | Carib King | 29.63 | 26 July 2009 | |
| 550 | Movealong Tony | 29.62 | 17 July 2011 | |
| 550 | Cabra Buck | 29.60 | 24 January 2013 | |
| 550 | Clonbrien Swift | 29.59 | 24 March 2019 | |
| 575 | Silver Shout | 31.23 | 27 April 2003 | |
| 575 | Charity Jack | 31.15 | 24 October 2003 | |
| 575 | Lucky Lindsey | 31.05 | 23 August 2007 | |
| 700 | Lady Bon | 40.40 | 18 May 1961 | |
| 730 | Manx Sky | 41.52* | 9 November 1987 | |
| 730 | Crohane Lucy | 41.16 | 1 February 1989 | |
| 730 | Benedine Rose | 41.16 | 1 February 1989 | |
| 730 | Mid Clare Lass | 40.88 | 3 February 1990 | |
| 750 | Just George | 41.28 | 1988 | |
| 750 | Top Award | 41.90 | 17 April 2003 | |
| 750 | Brave Legend | 41.82 | 24 August 2006 | |
| 750 | Musical Beauty | 41.49 | 29 October 2006 | |
| 750 | Dromana Blue | 41.47 | 15 November 2007 | |
| 750 | Flying Winner | 41.26 | 22 November 2007 | |
| 790 | Able Queen | 45.06 | 17 July 2003 | |
| 790 | Smooth Slippy | 44.73 | 22 August 2004 | |
| 790 | Lady Norma | 44.72 | 22 August 2004 | |
| 790 | Five Gold Bars | 44.50 | 23 March 2008 | |
| 790 | Thatll Do Jack | 44.41 | 25 January 2011 | |
| 790 | Freedom Marconi | 44.14 | 14 August 2011 | |
| 790 | Kerryroad Baba | 44.24 | 14 August 2011 | |
| 790 | Usual Story | 44.06 | 26 August 2012 | |
| 790 | Razldazl Marilyn | 44.00 | 17 January 2013 | |
| 1000 | Tokio Lady | 58.99 | 1988 | |
| 1015 | Original Charm | 58.15 | 27 July 2003 | |
| 1025 | Cute Way | 59.34 | 30 January 1989 | |
| 1025 | Fairy Surprise | 59.26 | 7 November 1991 | |
| 500 H | Knockdrina Ranger | 29.95 | 2 May 1957 | |
| 525 H | Fair King | 31.00 | 1950 | |
| 525 H | Jerrys Wonder | 30.90 | 11 May 1963 | |
| 525 H | Unguarded Moment | =30.90 | 16 May 1963 | |
| 525 H | Mars Mist | 30.12 | 1988 | |
| 550 H | Quarter Cross | 32.55 | 1950 | |
