= Greyhound racing in Ireland =

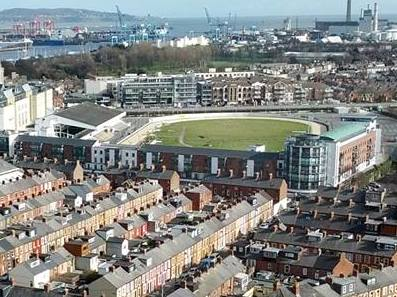
- View of Shelbourne Park
- Start date: 18 April 1927 at Celtic Park
- Nations: Republic of Ireland and Northern Ireland

Greyhound racing is a popular sport in Ireland. There are 17 stadiums operating in Ireland (two in Northern Ireland) of which nine are fully operated by Rásaíocht Con Éireann / Greyhound Racing Ireland (formerly named Irish Greyhound Board IGB, Bord na gCon) with the remaining six owned and operated by private enterprise but licensed by GRI.

Most have modern facilities including grandstand restaurants and parimutuel betting tote system with on-course and off-course betting available. Leading events include the Derby, Easter Cup, Champion Stakes, Cesarewitch, Oaks, Laurels and St Leger.

== History ==
Greyhound racing as it is seen today evolved from a sport called coursing. In 1926 the oval form of racing arrived in Britain at Belle Vue Stadium in Manchester which resulted in the creation of hundreds of tracks all over the United Kingdom and Ireland in the following ten years.

The sport of greyhound racing in Ireland mainly takes place in the Republic of Ireland but also in Northern Ireland. However, any tracks in Northern Ireland have always been in a regulatory limbo due to the fact that they are licensed neither by the Greyhound Board of Great Britain (GBGB) nor Greyhound Racing Ireland (named Bord na gCon until 2020).

To confuse matters still further, the industry regards racing as either UK or Irish, the latter including Northern Ireland. Greyhound Racing Ireland provides all of the results from Northern Ireland. The vast majority of greyhounds running in the UK are bred in Ireland (95% in 2017).

In 2019, the Irish government created the Greyhound Racing Act 2019, which set out new legislation. This came about because the industry came under scrutiny regarding the welfare of greyhounds from multiple newspaper articles, which reported various stories primarily about the breeding of greyhounds and racing greyhounds after they retire from racing. The Rásaíocht Con Éireann are now required to conduct a range of inspections under the Welfare of Greyhounds Act, including a traceability system.

== Stadiums ==
- Clonmel (Private)
- Cork (GRI)
- Derry (N Ireland)
- Drumbo Park (N Ireland)
- Dundalk (Private)
- Enniscorthy (Private)
- Galway (GRI)
- Kilkenny (Private)
- Lifford (Private)
- Limerick (GRI)
- Mullingar (GRI)
- Newbridge (GRI)
- Shelbourne Park (GRI)
- Thurles (Private)
- Tralee (GRI)
- Waterford (GRI)
- Youghal (GRI)

== Competitions ==
There are many types of competitions in Ireland but the primary race is the Irish Greyhound Derby held at Shelbourne Park. Along with the English Greyhound Derby it is considered to be one of the "Big Two" in greyhound racing.

Greyhound Racing Ireland publishes an annual list of feature events.

== Five-year strategic plan (2025–2029) ==
In July 2025, Rásaíocht Con Éireann / Greyhound Racing Ireland (RCÉ/GRI) unveiled its five-year strategic plan (2025–2029), aimed at securing the future of greyhound racing in Ireland through reforms in welfare, sustainability, public engagement, and operational improvements.

=== Background ===
Greyhound Racing Ireland (GRI, operating under its statutory title Rásaíocht Con Éireann) is the authority charged with regulation, development, and promotion of greyhound racing in Ireland. Facing evolving social expectations around animal welfare, increasing regulatory demands, and challenges in maintaining the sport’s commercial and public relevance, GRI developed its Strategic Plan 2025-2029 (launched 23 July 2025 at Shelbourne Park) to chart a course for modernisation.

=== Strategic Pillars ===
The plan is structured around four core pillars: - Animal Welfare and Transparency - strengthening welfare standards, improving traceability, integrating veterinary and welfare inspection data, and public accountability.

- Industry Sustainability - ensuring financial resilience, investing in infrastructure (including stadium modernisation), and enhancing commercial viability.

- Public Engagement - increasing involvement of owners, trainers, breeders, and the general public; combating misinformation; developing educational and community outreach programmes.

- Operational Excellence - improving governance; enhancing operational systems; empowering local management of stadiums; implementing measurable impacts and robust performance metrics.

Some of the major initiatives outlined in the plan include: Traceability enhancements: Broadening the existing programme to more fully integrate veterinary/welfare inspection data.

- Transparency and welfare reporting: Committing to regular public reporting on welfare, operations, and performance.

- Stadium modernisation: Upgrades to facilities (notably flagship venues like Shelbourne Park), and more localised venue management.

- Strengthening post-racing care: Reinforcing the role of the Irish Retired Greyhound Trust (IRGT) to enhance rehoming supports for retired racing greyhounds.

- Broader public outreach and education: Developing community partnerships, education programmes, and communication strategies to improve public perception and engagement.

RCÉ emphasises measurable impact, financial resilience, and strong governance as foundations of the plan. Oversight includes regular reporting; a six-month Industry Activity Report was announced alongside the plan’s launch to provide interim metrics.

The Strategic Plan 2025–2029 represents a major commitment by GRI to modernise the Irish greyhound racing sector, aligning it more firmly with contemporary welfare standards, accountability, and sustainability. It is also intended to reinforce Ireland’s reputation globally in animal welfare and as a leader in regulatory and industry innovation in greyhound racing.

== General information ==
=== Graded racing ===
This is any minor race staged at a track, with prize money varying widely. This kind of racing is the most common at the various stadia.

=== Racing jacket colours ===
Greyhound racing in Ireland has a standard colour scheme (the same as in the UK).

- Trap 1 = Red with White numeral
- Trap 2 = Blue with White numeral
- Trap 3 = White with Black numeral
- Trap 4 = Black with White numeral
- Trap 5 = Orange with Black numeral
- Trap 6 = Black & White Stripes with Red numeral

A racing jacket worn by a reserve bears an additional letter 'R' shown prominently on each side.
