= British Bred Produce Stakes =

British greyhound racing competition

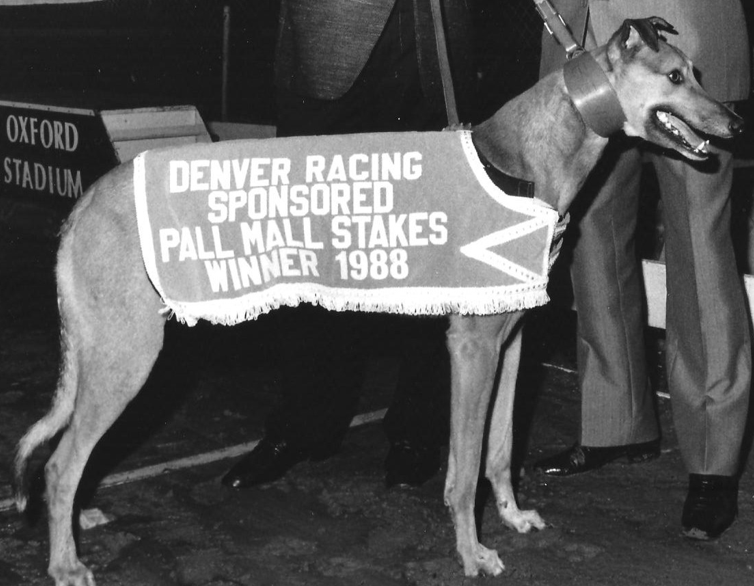
- 1987 champion Fearless Ace
- Class: Category 1
- Location: Eastville Stadium (1946–1997); Swindon Stadium (2020–2025)
- Inaugurated: 1946
- Final run: 2025
- Sponsor: British Greyhound Breeders Forum

Race information
- Surface: Sand

The British Bred Produce Stakes was a greyhound racing competition held annually at Abbey Stadium.

== History ==
It was inaugurated in 1946 at Eastville Stadium in Bristol when it was known as the Western Two-Year Old Stakes. The following year it was renamed the Western Two-Year Old Produce Stakes in order to distinguish the event as a produce event (restricted to puppies from specifically Wales and the West).

The competition was later extended to all regions but remained a puppy event. Following the closure of Bristol in 1997 it switched to sister track Swindon. The event today is open to British Bred greyhounds only. After 2019 the competition was held on the revamped Swindon circuit.

In 2025 Swindon ran the event for the last time, following the imminent closure of track.

== Venues ==
- 1946–1997 (Bristol-Eastville, 500 yards)
- 1998–2019 (Swindon, 480m)
- 2020–2025 (Swindon, 476m)

== Past winners ==
Year	Winner	Breeding	Trainer	Time (sec)	SP	Notes/ref
1946	Brighter Days		Stan Raymond (Gloucester)	28.74	1/3f	
1947	Regal Commander		William Mills (Private)	29.94	12/1	
1948	Narrogar Ann	Dutton Swordfish – Winnie of Berrow	Joe Farrand (Oxford)	29.28	1/1f	
1949	Drastic O'Leer	Bahs Choice – Baytown Nightingale	Bill Gigg (Private)	29.06	7/4f	
1950	Bantham		Jack Bannister (Eastville)	29.05	10/1	
1951	Beyond Doubt	Lights O’London – Black Duchess	Stan Raymond (Gloucester)	29.53	11/4	
1952	Midnight Charlotte	Rimmells Black – Midnight Cradle	Stan Martin (Wimbledon)	29.08	1/1f	
1953	Kensington Perfection	Black Invasion – Lambourn Firefly	Bill Higgins (Oxford)	28.29	1/2f	Track record
1954	Box Hedge	Eastern Madness – Be Happy	Gunner Smith (Brighton)	29.06	6/1	
1956	Dandelion’s Prince	Confey Dandelion – Fen Road Queen	Bill Dash (Private)	28.89	7/4f	
1957	Kilpoole Bandit	Magourna Reject – Kilpoole Christine	Jimmy Jowett (Clapton)	28.99	1/1f	
1958	Wincot Clifford	Fly Prince - Whoosh	Jack Toseland (Perry Barr)	28.78	4/11f	
1959	The Pieces	Barrowside – Black Eyed Susie	George Miller (Clapton)	29.94	4/1	
1960	Kensington Pioneer	Kensington Prince – Ann Dell	Marjorie Phipps (Oxford)	30.19	6/1	
1961	Old Berry Silver	Ardskeagh Ville - Skylark	Jack Toseland (Perry Barr)	29.85		
1962	Prince Belle	Dependable Prince – Line View	Dennis Hannafin (Wimbledon)	30.25		
1963	Burniston Boy	First Prize – Burniston Beauty	P.Goodison (Bradford)	29.84		
1964	Old Berry Hermes	Gleaming Prince – Shannon Sunshine	Fred Berrow (Private)	29.56	2/1jf	
1965	Sunderon	Highwood Sovereign – Grenaghs Duck	Des Ellington (Oxford)	29.82		
1966	Cricket Film	Palms Printer - Juggie	G.Jackson (Private)	29.55		
1967	Marton Joe	Clogher Cave – Bunclody Melody	Tom Baldwin (Perry Barr)	30.00		
1968	Happy Harry	Crazy Society – Hiver Swanky	Jim Morgan (Private)	28.58	5/1	
1969	Perth Pat	Maryville Hi – Swiver Hanky	Jim Morgan (Private)	28.25	9/2	
1970	Peasedown Merang	Peasedown Magic – Peasedown Maid	Harry Sayer (Bristol)	28.22	11/4	
1971	Arcon Blue	Ambiguous – Carmen Switch	Mrs Mary Baber (Bristol)	28.89	7/2	
1972	Marton Sarah	Discretions – Marton Jayne	Jim Russell (Private)	28.89	6/1	
1973	Pile Driver	Ballyseedy Star – Jadeite	Hazel Walden (Private)	28.66	4/7f	
1974	Daemonic Gambol	Don’t Gambol – Dusk Gambol	Paddy McEvoy (Wimbledon)	28.52	1/5f	
1975	Forest Storm	Newdown Heather – Forest Brown	Paddy McEvoy (Wimbledon)	29.37	10/11f	
1976	Angel Eyes	Craggs Flier – Morris Magpie	Ted Parker (Harringay)	28.63	8/1	
1977	Ballybryan Bolt	Westmead Lane – Maggies Heather	Hugh McEntyre (Bletchley)	28.78	1/3f	
1978	Ricky Q	Myrtown – Rolling Ridge	Paddy McEvoy (Wimbledon)	29.14	1/1f	
1979	Feldon Squire	Sandispec – Feldon Lady	Corely (Bletchley)	28.52	6/4f	
1980	Mr Candy	Sudden Start – Val’s Candy	Mrs J Green (Swindon)	28.45	7/4f	
1981	Milo Gem	Curhumore Speech – Ollies Folly	Rod Markwell (Bristol)	28.27	5/1	
1982	Donnas Dixie	Black Beetle – Bright Parade	Henry Kibble (Bristol)	28.54	1/5f	
1983	Balynjohn Lad	Balliniska Band – Phillistine	Mervyn Osborne (Bristol)	28.67	7/4jf	
1984	Ballybeg Steel	Minnesota Miller – Ballybeg Heather	Vicky Holloway (Oxford)	28.41	4/6f	
1985	Chiltern Sam	Glenroe Hiker – Tina Monday	Peggy Cope (Milton Keynes)	28.49	10/11f	
1986	Fulwood Star	Gentle Star – Just Be Fair	Moffat – Whitwood (Castleford)	28.59	3/1	
1987	Fearless Ace	Mt Keefe Star – Sarahs Bunny	Geoff De Mulder (Oxford)	28.11	1/7f	
1988	The Aeroplane	Ron Hardy – Squiffy	Geoff De Mulder (Norton Canes)	28.58	11/10f	
1989	Wiltshire Ann	Supreme Tiger – Berkshire Ann	Ian Plank (Swindon)	29.01	7/1	
1990	Moscow Magic	Mollifrend Lucky – Moscow Miss	John Coleman (Walthamstow)	28.94	11/8f	
1991	Batsford Boy	Hit the Lid – Midnight Cassim	Tony Mann (Swindon)	28.86	16/1	
1992	Ultimate Gamble	Manorville Magic – Special Gamble	Jennifer March (Private)	27.90	11/4	
1993	Cortman Jasper	Flashy Sir – Lonely Bird	Tony Meek (Oxford)	28.36	4/1	
1994	Wolf Man	Slaneyside Hare – Clongeel Liz	Leo Pugh (Hall Green)	27.92	4/5f	
1997	Staplers Jade	Moral Standards – Perfect Rhythm	Tony Meek (Hall Green)	27.98	4/6f	
1998	Kirby Morals	Moral Standards – Sandford Katie	Steve Davis (Swindon)	28.02	3/1	
1999	Hedsor Rock	Light of Fire - Benjamino	Keith Howard (Reading)	28.79	20/1	
2000	Touchdown Lobo	Shanless Slippy – Come on Dolly	Pete Ruddick (Poole)	29.09	5/1	
2001	Lukes the Best	Toms The Best - Treasure	Peter Rich (Romford)	29.73	8/11f	
2002	Stinger	Night Trooper – First Degree	Nikki Chambers (Nottingham)	28.70	2/1f	
2003	Pitch Rocket	Sineads Rocket – Kiel Polly	William Davies (Swindon)	29.45	5/2	
2004	Robbie de Niro	Knockeevan Star – Whitefort Queen	Sandra Ralph (Monmore)	28.82	1/2f	
2005	Lowkey	Daves Mentor – Shake Up May	Peter Bailey (Private)	28.79	7/1	
2006	Westmead Joe	Larkhill Jo – Mega Delight	Nick Savva (Private)	28.59	4/9f	
2007	Hedsor Chipa	Droopys Scolari – Hedsor Sheila	Keith Howard (Reading)	29.29	5/1	
2008	Westmead Osprey	Westmead Hawk – Droopys Jean	Nick Savva (Private)	28.74	4/5f	
2009	Troys Expert	Collision – Fabulous March	David Firmager (Private)	28.29	1/1f	Track record
2010	Micky Robbie	Crash - Talktothehand	Pat Rosney (Monmore)	28.53	8/11f	
2011	Romeo Metro	Wheres Pedro – Fabulous March	David Firmager (Private)	28.62	6/1	
2012	Peacemaker	Daves Mentor – Kitty Spark	John Millard (Coventry)	28.47	2/1f	
2013	Son of Delboy	Blackstone Gene – Little Reaction	Stuart Buckland (Hall Green)	28.73	7/2	
2014	Take the Crown	Westmead Hawk – Little Flame	Pat Rosney (Perry Barr)	28.34	2/5f	
2015	Fabulous Expert	Head Bound – Fabulous Quest	David Firmager (Hall Green)	28.64	3/1	
2016	Bansha Rooskey	Taylors Sky - Bansha Mo	Dave Acott (Perry Barr)	28.83	7/1	
2017	King Elvis	Tullymurry Act - Skate On	Liz McNair (Private)	28.74	1/1f	
2018	Zenas Zeus	Tullymurry Act - Westmead Lola	Jenny March (Central Park)	28.90	3/1	
2019	King Sheeran	Eden The Kid - Skate On	Liz McNair (Private)	28.41	4/6f	
2020	Queen Jessiej	Leamaneigh Turbo - Skate On	Liz McNair (Private)	27.95	8/11f	New track dimensions
2021	Pocket Lola	Droopys Sydney – Banabane	Seamus Cahill (Brighton)	28.15	5/6f	
2022	Signet Denver	Magical Bale – Banabane	Kevin Hutton (Towcester)	27.70	13/8f	
2023	Queen Joni	Droopys Sydney – Queen Jessiej	Liz McNair (Private)	27.80	10/11f	
2024	Southfield Poppy	Droopys Sydney – Forest Natalee	Kevin Hutton (Oxford)	28.29	4/1	
2025	Eagles Respect	Tommy Shelby – A Little Respect	Angie Kibble (Swindon)	28.14	4/1	
