= Oxfordshire Gold Cup =

British greyhound racing competition

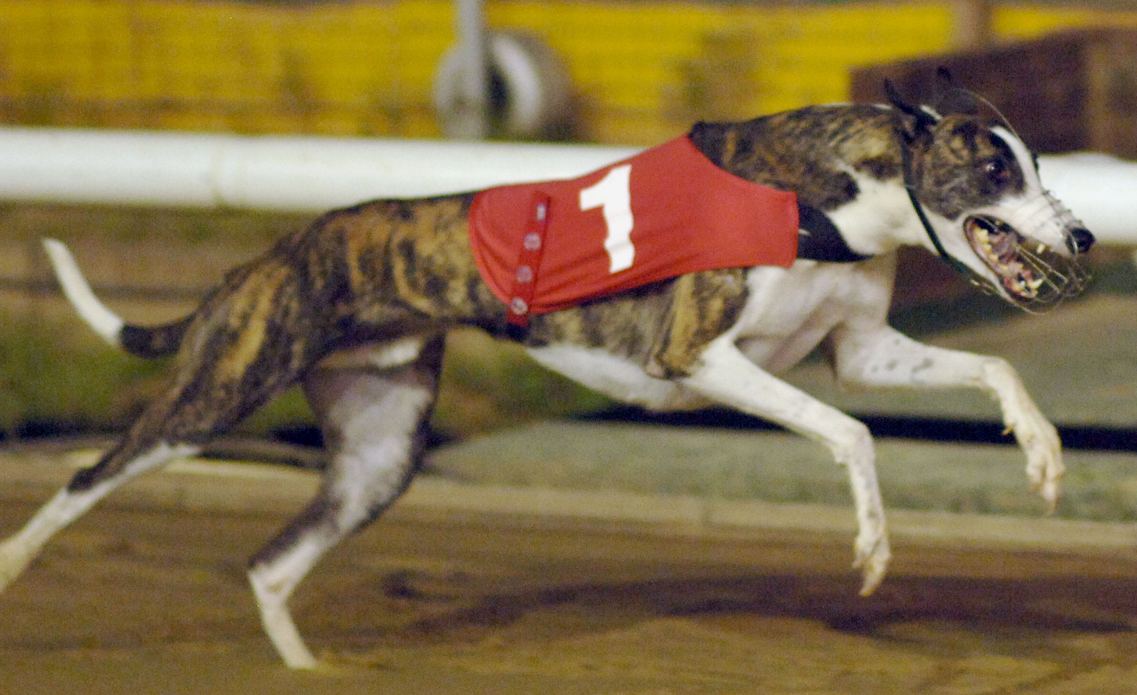
- Jolly Poacher, three time winner
- Class: Category 2
- Location: Oxford Stadium
- Inaugurated: 1985
- Final run: 2012

Race information
- Distance: 450 metres
- Surface: Sand

The Oxfordshire Gold Cup was a greyhound racing competition held at Oxford Stadium until the stadium closed in 2012. The competition was inaugurated in 1985 and introduced by Mick Wheble. It was won three times in succession by Jolly Poacher.

== Distances ==
- 1985-2012 (450 metres)

== Sponsors ==
- 1986–1986 (Hall's Brewery Skol)
- 1987–1987 (E.J Watts & Sons)
- 1988–1988 (Lynton Racing)
- 1990–1995 (Stadium Bookmakers)
- 1996–1998 (Carlsberg)
- 1999–2000 (RD Racing)
- 2001–2001 (William Hill)
- 2002–2006 (RD Racing)
- 2007–2007 (Stadium Bookmakers)
- 2009–2011 (Blanchford Building Supplies)
- 2012–2012 (Claydon Racing)

== Past winners ==
Year	Winner	Breeding	Trainer	Time	SP	Notes
1985	Nippy Law	Lax Law - Law Fancy	Geoff De Mulder (Oxford)	27.04 sec	13–8f	
1987	Cannon Roe	Glenroe Hiker - Westmead Rhythm	Mel Bass (Private)	27.13 sec	11–2	
1985	Fairway Wink	Ballyheigue Moon - Hold Your Wink	Bertie Gaynor (Hall Green)	27.07 sec	8–1	
1988	Money Matters	Glenroe Hiker - Money Rings	Geoff De Mulder (Hall Green)	26.81 sec	11–2	Track Record
1989	Castleivy Mick	Moral Support - Rambling Florist	Freda Greenacre (Private)	27.49 sec	4–1	
1990	Kilcurley Coal	Moneypoint Coal - Victoria Range	John McGee Sr. (Hackney)	26.97 sec	13–2	
1991	Seafield Quest	I'm Slippy - Irenes Whisper	Marlene Westwood (Peterborough)	26.80 sec	3–1	
1992	Lackabane Tap	Tapwatcher - Airhill Foam	Geoff Goodwin (Private)	27.43 sec	4–1	
1994	Freds Flyer	Whisper Wishes - Roving Linda	Bill Masters (Hove)	27.29 sec	2–1	
1995	Self Made	Greenpark Fox - She Who Dares	Maurice Massey (Oxford)	27.30 sec	6–4f	
1996	Clean Paws	Arrow House - Mustnt Grumble	Lorraine King (Peterborough)	27.44 sec	11–8f	
1997	Silver Circle	Slippy Blue - Untidy Ann	Andy Heyes (Private)	27.09 sec	7–2	
1998	Reactabond Gold	Super Hoffman - Dear Liza	Paul Young (Harlow)	26.94 sec	7–4f	
1999	Crack Off	Mountleader Peer - Highsted Rose	Brian Clemenson (Hove)	27.09 sec	9–2	
2000	El Boss	Pepes Dilemma - Bid You Joy	Linda Mullins (Walthamstow)	27.15 sec	1–1f	
2001	El Ronan	Staplers Jo - Freds Flame	Charlie Lister OBE (Private)	27.10 sec	4–6f	
2002	Bomber Graham	Top Honcho – Faultless Quest	Jimmy Gibson (Belle Vue)	26.90 sec	6–4f	
2003	Knockeevan Magic	Knockeevan Star - Knockeevan Lucy	Peter Rich (Romford)	26.79 sec	5–2	
2004	Fire Height Dan	Carlton Bale - September Mist	Mick Puzey (Walthamstow)	27.12 sec	6–4f	
2005	Roswell Spaceman	Top Honcho – Butterbridge Viv	Mark Wallis (Walthamstow)	26.74 sec	7–2	
2006	Two Cool Cats	Spiral Nikita - Mural	Andy Heyes (Belle Vue)	26.76 sec	10–1	
2007	Barnfield Joe	Larkhill Jo – Final Fantasy	Julie Luckhurst (Crayford)	26.60 sec	2–1f	
2008	Barnfield Joe	Larkhill Jo – Final Fantasy	Julie Luckhurst (Crayford)	26.90 sec	4–1	
2009	Jolly Poacher	Droopys Cahill – Miss Regina	Richard Yeates (Oxford)	26.53 sec	4–6f	
2010	Jolly Poacher	Droopys Cahill – Miss Regina	Nick Colton (Oxford)/(Swindon)	26.67 sec	5–2	
2011	Jolly Poacher	Droopys Cahill – Miss Regina	Nick Colton (Oxford)/(Swindon)	26.66 sec	4–1	
2012	Barnish Booth	Nobooth For Gary - Marys Moment	Kevin Hutton (Swindon)	26.91 sec	8–1	

Discontinued

== Gallery ==
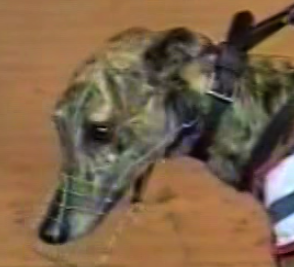
Fairway Wink 1987 winner

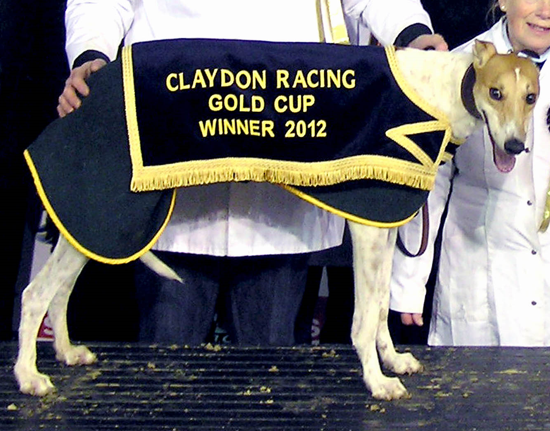
Barnish Booth 2012 winner
