= Hunt Cup =

Greyhound race in England

- Class: Category 1
- Location: Oxford Stadium
- Inaugurated: 1931
- Sponsor: Bet365

Race information
- Distance: 650 metres
- Surface: Sand
- Purse: £10,000

The Hunt Cup is a greyhound racing competition held at Oxford Stadium in England.

== History ==
The race had its inaugural running during 1931 and was held at Reading Stadium (Oxford Road) over 400 yards, initially advertised as a major sprint event.

In 1933, an event at Blackpool Squires Gate Greyhound Stadium, also called the Hunt Cup was won by Beef Cutlet, who broke the world record for 500 yards straight in the semi-finals. However, the event was unrelated to this competition. From 1951 until 1957 the event was not held, but it was brought back in 1958 over 460 yards.

In 1974, the Oxford Road site was closed, and eventually the competition switched to the new Reading Stadium on Bennet Road by permission of the Greyhound Racing Association, who allowed Allied Presentations Ltd to re-introduce the event in 1978. However, once again the race ended because of yet another closure, when the stadium was sold by the council to developers during 2008.

After a 13-year absence, the event was brought back by promoter Kevin Boothby at Towcester Greyhound Stadium and Oxford Stadium.

== Past winners ==
Year	Winner	Trainer	Time (sec)	SP	Notes/Ref
1931	Unknown				
1932	Unknown				
1933	Unknown				
1934	Unknown				
1935	Unknown				
1936	Light Lucifer	Arthur Doc Callanan (Wembley)	22.50	6/1	
	1937 cancelled due to insufficient entries				
1938	Produski	Paddy Quigley (West Ham)	22.11	9/4	
1939	Brave Reward	J P Young (Private)	22.51	7/1	
	1940-1944 not held				
1945	Look Out Post	Jack Harvey (Wembley)	22.14	7/2	
1946	Ferry Robin	Paddy McEllistrim (Wimbledon)	22.33	3/1	
1947	Rowley	P. O'Shaughnessy (Wandsworth)	22.32	6/1	
1948	Kerry Rally	Paddy McEllistrim (Wimbledon)	22.48	5/2jf	
1949	Burndennet Brook	Leslie Reynolds (Wembley)	22.05	6/4f	
1950	Derrycrussan	Tom Smith (Clapton)	22.00	4/6f	
	1951-1957 not held				
1958	Knockarea Chancer	Jack Harvey (Wembley)	25.74	4/7f	
1963	Sir Walter	Jimmy Jowett (Clapton)	28.05		
1964	Captain Pike	Phil Rees Sr. (Private)	28.16	7/4jf	
1965	Silver Glory	Paddy McEvoy (Wimbledon)	28.26		
1966	Shamrock Clipper	Phil Rees Sr. (Wimbledon)	28.40		
1967	Lucky Me	Len Drewery (Private)	28.33		
1968	Dreaming Prince	Reg Webb (Private)	27.87	5/1	
1969	Beaverwood Wind	Stan Martin (Wimbledon)	27.89	7/4jf	
1970	Spotted Rory	Paddy McEllistrim (Wimbledon)	28.48		
1971	Houghton Arkle	Barbara Tompkins (Private)		8/1	
1972	Houghton Gyp	Barbara Tompkins (Private)	28.01	5/2	
1973	21 June				
	1974-1977 not held				
1978	Westmead Manor	Natalie Savva (Bletchley)	39.65		
1980	Mogeely Honour	Terry Dartnall	42.64	4/1	
1981	Curragh Bridge	John Honeysett (Crayford)	42.31	5/1	
1982	Wolf Cub	Ray Iremonger (Slough)	41.24	3/1	
1983	Astrosyn Doll	Ray Peacock (Harringay)	41.42		
1984	Hot Candy	John Copplestone (Portsmouth)	42.08	8/1	
1985	Spill the Beans	Tony Meek (Swindon)	41.28		
1986	Milltown Genius	Kenny Linzell (Walthamstow)	41.71	11/4	
1987	Lowerton Susie	(Wimbledon)	41.14		
1988	Waltham Abbey	Adam Jackson (Wembley)	41.17		
1989	Trans Mercedes	Maldwyn Thomas (Reading)		8/11f	
1990	Coloured Panther	Jo Burridge (Portsmouth)	41.55	7/2	
1991	Snow Shoes	John McGee Sr. (Canterbury)	41.16	2/1f	
1992	Airmount Flash	Jimmy Gibson (Belle Vue)	41.19	11/10f	
1993	Johns Banana	John McGee Sr.		8/1	
1994	Sonic Blue	Arthur Hitch (Wimbledon)		5/2	
1995	9 Dec				
1996	Liosgarbh Glory	Terry Dartnall		5/2	
1997	Lydpal Frankie	Tony Meek (Hall Green)	41.49	9/2	
1998	Palace Issue	Linda Mullins (Walthamstow)	41.10	4/7f	
1999	Palace Issue	Linda Mullins (Walthamstow)	41.80	8/11f	
2000	Palace Issue	Linda Mullins (Walthamstow)	41.32	1/6f	
2001	Southlodge Rage	Nick Colton (Oxford)	41.34	5/2	
2002	Princess Manor	Jo Burridge (Poole)	41.15	16/1	
2003	Double Take	Andy Heyes (Belle Vue)	40.50	7/4f	Track record
2004	Shelbourne Lyn	Nick Colton (Oxford)	41.25	7/4f	
2005	Call Girl	Paul Foster (Swindon)	41.94	5/2jf	
2006	Well Tutored	Terry Dartnall (Reading)	41.31	4/1	
2007	Spankee Moved	Heather Dimmock (Peterborough)	41.18	9/4	
	2008-2020 not held				
2021	Salacres Pippy	Peter Harnden (Towcester)	42.90	9/4	Track record
2022	Chelms Cub	Jason Heath (Hove)	43.17	11/1	
2023	Havana Lover	Liz McNair (Central Park)	39.41	11/8f	
2024	Havana Top Note	Liz McNair (Central Park)	39.83	1/1f	
2025	Hogans Hawk	Seamus Cahill (Hove)	39.44	15/8	

== Venues & Distances ==
- 1931–1950 (Reading Oxford Road, 400y)
- 1958–1971 (Reading Oxford Road, 460y)
- 1972–1973 (Reading Oxford Road, 500y)
- 1978–1978 (Reading Bennett Road, 635m)
- 1980–2007 (Reading Bennett Road, 660m)
- 2021–2022 (Towcester, 712m)
- 2023–present (Oxford, 650m)

== Sponsors ==
- 1971, 1980 (Stadium Bookmakers)
- 1984–1989 (Hall's Oxford Brewery)
- 1990–1992 (Castlemaine XXXX)
- 1993–1996 (Carlsberg Tetley)
- 2021–2022 (Stadium Bookmakers)
- 2023–present (Bet365)
