= Trafalgar Cup =

Former greyhound racing competition

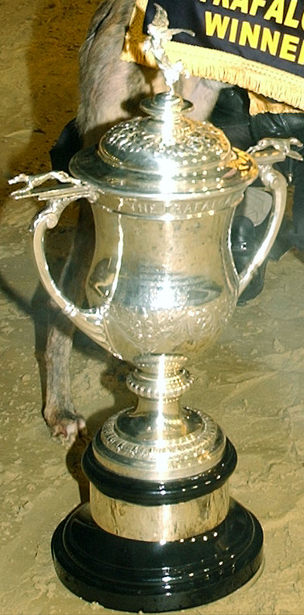
- Class: Category 2
- Location: Wembley (1929–1998); Oxford (1999–2012); Monmore (2015–2019)
- Inaugurated: 1929
- Final run: 2019

Race information
- Surface: Sand
- Qualification: Puppies only (15-24 months old)

The Trafalgar Cup was a greyhound racing competition for puppies under the age of two. It is the oldest puppy competition in the racing calendar.

It was first contested at Wembley Stadium from 1929 until 1998, but when the Wembley Greyhounds ended it moved to Oxford Stadium in 1999 and then on to Monmore Green Stadium in 2015 until 2019.

== Venues & Distances ==
- 1929–1974 (Wembley, 525y)
- 1975–1998 (Wembley, 490m)
- 1999–2012 (Oxford, 450m)
- 2015–2019 (Monmore, 480m)

== Past winners ==
Year	Winner	Breeding	Trainer	Time (sec)	SP
1929	So Green	Running Rein – Salsette	Jim Syder Sr. (Wembley)	30.48	
1930	Seldom Led	Society Boy – Pity	Wally Green (West Ham)	30.76	
1931	Wild Woolley	Hautley – Wild Witch	Jack Rimmer (White City-Manchester)	30.84	
1932	Mikado Beauty	Hertford – Little Fawn Biddy	Jim Syder Sr. (Wembley)	31.02	7/2
1933	Grey Raca	Barna Maghery – Maesydd Mischief	Johnny Bullock (Harringay)	30.86	5/4f
1934	Black Lion Favourite	Drumcro – Jinnie Pride	George McKay (Reading)	30.93	7/2
1935	Esksell	Elsell – Eskbank	Les Parry (White City)	30.55	2/1
1936	Grosvenor Bob	Golden Hammer – Wonderful Expression	Jim Syder Sr. (Wembley)	30.22	2/1
1937	Quarter Day	Lawyers Fee- House Keeper	Joe Harmon (Wimbledon)	30.62	7/2
1938	Gayhunter	Dans Leg - Trianon Lass	Patrick McKinney (Carntyne)	30.44	5/2
1941	Laughing Lieutenant	Beef Cutlet – Maid Of Tenby	Bert Heyes (White City)	30.12	7/4f
1942	Jubilee Time	Fine Jubilee – Winning Time	Leslie Reynolds (Wembley)	30.97	11/4
1943	Dark Tiger	Tiger Jazz – See The Light	Bill Higgins (Oxford)	30.18	9/2
1944	Wandering Lad	Kilrea Lad – Mildas Jason	Stanley Biss (Clapton Stadium)	30.12	100/7
1945	Ballymac Tanist	Tanist – Ramolas Pet Again	Leslie Reynolds (Wembley)	29.68	6/4f
1946	Shadowlands Delight	Wireless Delight – Shadowlands Sirius	Ivy Regan (Private)	30.20	11/8
1947	Mad Birthday	Mad Tanist – Bellas Bloom	Stanley Biss (Clapton Stadium)	29.73	11/8
1948	Baytown Colonel	Baytown Cuckoo – Baytown Crow	Stanley Biss (Clapton Stadium)	29.73	9/4
1949	Ballycurren Garrett	Ballycurren Duke – Ballymakeera Keeper	Jack Harvey (Wembley)	30.39	10/1
1950	Rushton Smutty	Mad Tanist – Summer Frock	Jack Harvey (Wembley)	30.00	11/4
1951	Magourna Reject	Astras Son – Saucy Dame	Noreen Collin (Walthamstow)	29.81	2/5f
1952	Galtee Cleo	Sandown Champion – Cleopatra	Jack Harvey (Wembley)	29.39	5/4
1953	Pauls Fun	Sandown Champion – All Fun	Leslie Reynolds (Wembley)	29.49	10/1
1954	Golden Sail	Maddest Neighbour – Merry Mistake	George Crussell (Private)	29.71	6/1
1955	Our Tim II	Endless Gossip – Hanslope Jean	Joe Pickering (New Cross)	29.78	6/1
1956	Highwood Sovereign	Westbourne – Pretty Miss Amber	Tom Smith (Clapton Stadium)	29.67	7/2
1957	Deep River	Baytown Coak – Newhill Primrose	Bob Burls (Wembley)	29.62	7/4f
1958	Joys Prince	Smalltown – Fancy Fawn	George Waterman (Wimbledon)	30.03	20/1
1959	Duleek Dandy	Flash Jack – Flower Of Duleek	Bill Dash (Private)	29.72	11/4
1960	Ballinsloe Blondie	Northern King – Ballinasloe Chicken	Jack Harvey (Wembley)	29.95	7/4
1961	Little Archie	Flash Jack – Little Jingler	Harry Parsons (Crayford)	30.09	5/1
1962	Sugarloaf Scott	Fearless Mac – Nellies Unit	Phil Rees Sr. (Clapton Stadium)	29.67	1/1f
1963	Fear O	Man Of Pleasure – Summer	Pam Heasman (Private)	29.30	10/1
1964	Double March	Buffalo Bill – Racing On	M Sanderson (Private)	29.35	4/1
1965	Ling Bird	The Grand Canal – Cheeky Ciss	Tommy 'Paddy' Reilly (Walthamstow)	29.42	4/9f
1966	Lucky Me	Hook Chieftain – Avenue East	Tommy 'Paddy' Reilly (Walthamstow)	29.33	5/1
1967	King Cheata	Jamie Serra – Madam Cheata	Barney O'Connor (Walthamstow)	29.94	16/1
1968	Active Host	Faithful Hope – Painting Rosedale	Paddy McEvoy (Wimbledon)	29.73	2/1
1969	Sherwood Glen	Maryville Hi – Bresheen Umm	Joe Booth (Private)	29.47	5/4f
1970	Todos Kingpin	Hi Express – Lough Sillan Girl	Jack Durkin (Walthamstow)	29.67	10/1
1971	Todos Imp	Hi Express – Estelles Folly	David Geggus (Walthamstow)	29.56	14/1
1972	Stow Welcome	Own Pride – Miss Equal	Barney O'Connor (Walthamstow)	29.44	2/1jf
1973	Coin Case	Finolas Yarn – Lovely Silk	Charlie Smoothy (Clapton Stadium)	29.55	1/5f
1974	Pineapple Grand	The Grand Silver – Pineapple Baby	Frank Baldwin (Perry Barr)	29.08	1/5f
1975	The Snow Queen	Right O'Myross – Ballybeg Model	Sid Ryall (Wembley)	29.34	6/4f
1976	Hunsdon Pride	Monalee Pride – Offshore Spec	David Geggus (Walthamstow)	29.33	11/2
1977	Homely Girl	Kudas Honour – Our House	Geoff De Mulder (Hall Green)	29.30	3/1
1978	Offshore Diver	Bright Lad – Offshore Spec	Chris Coyle (Private)	29.32	12/1
1979	Trinas Girl	Myrtown – Trina Ceili	Edna Wearing (Bletchley)	29.53	3/1
1980	Sailor May	Shamrock Sailor – Ellie May	David Kinchett (Wimbledon)	29.35	10/11f
1981	Careless Dragon	Dragonara – Aileen Alanna	Jim Morgan (Oxford)	29.24	11/8f
1982	Mt Keeffe Star	Nameless Star – Hi Land Peg	Geoff De Mulder (Coventry)	29.35	7/1
1983	Glenamona	Thurles Yard - Lady Clonad	Maurice Buckland (Cradley Heath)	29.52	9/2
1984	Debbies Time	Killaclug Jet – Debbies Darkey	Paddy Hancox (Hall Green)	29.34	2/1f
1985	Ticketys Gift	Armagh Rocket – Gabrielle	Geoff De Mulder (Private)	29.36	10/11f
1986	Trans Brandy	Knockrour Slave – Shelley	Ernie Gaskin Sr. (Private)	29.70	16/1
1987	Fearless Ace	Mt Keeffe Star – Sarahs Bunny	Geoff De Mulder (Private)	29.06	7/2
1988	Alley Bally	Alleys Blue – Penmaric	Terry Dartnall (Wembley)	28.96	7/2
1989	Saucy Ben	Hot Sauce Yankee – Blazing City	Tom Foster (Wimbledon)	29.99	7/1
1990	Madison Supreme	Odell Supreme – Donoughmore Rose	Barry Silkman (Private)	29.36	7/2
1991	Claymor Spot	Black Tango – Latchstring	Bob Gilling (Reading)	29.32	2/1f
1992	Gara Paint	Curryhills Gara - Paint And Powder	Norah McEllistrim (Wimbledon)	29.30	7/2
1993	Affadown Tony	Ballyard Hoffman – Aghadown Heather	Nikki Adams (Canterbury)	29.48	7/2
1994	Trade Exchange	Greenpark Fox – Trade Gold	Tony Taylor (Private)	29.16	7/4f
1995	Clear Prospect	Deerpark Jim – Clear Issue	Linda Mullins (Walthamstow)	29.58	20/1
1996	Listen To This	Itsallovernow – Danielles Lady	Chris Duggan (Walthamstow)	29.35	6/4jf
1997	Ground Zero	Slaneyside Hare – Glue Vixen	Geoff De Mulder (Private)	28.85	2/9f
1998	El Cantor	Westmead Merlin – Tullig Choice	Linda Mullins (Walthamstow)	29.30	4/1
1999	Sensational	Boyne Walk – Droopys Fiona	Jim Reynolds (Walthamstow)	27.15	5/2
2000	Droopys Mint	Staplers Jo-Quare Season	Ted Soppitt (Private)	27.06	6/1
2001	Greenacre Belle	Larkhill Jo-Longvalley Belle	Ray Peacock (Wimbledon)	27.13	3/1
2002	Cooly Cougar	Top Honcho-Droopys Kylie	Brian Clemenson (Hove)	26.87	9/4f
2003	Money Sweeper	Powerful Flash-Cry Rocky	Jenny March (Peterborough)	27.23	6/1
2004	Kegans Choice	Top Honcho - Kegans Miss	Brian Clemenson (Hove)	27.41	5/1
2005	Camp Bugler	Droopys Vieri-Farloe Dingle	Barrie Draper (Sheffield)	26.72	5/2
2006	Horseshoe Ping	Top Honcho-Lucy May	Jim Reynolds (Romford)	26.86	3/1
2007	Westcounty Lady	Top Honcho-Pats Flight	Jo Burridge (Poole)	27.14	7/1
2008	Drink Up Zorro	Galipip Trooper – Hows Tings	Paul Sallis (Hall Green)	26.95	5/1
2009	Freedom Emma	Brett Lee - Miss Freckles	Richard Yeates (Oxford)	26.64	3/1
2010	Stans Printer	Boherduff Light – Killough Pearl	Jim Reynolds (Romford)	27.58	2/1
2011	Spencers Lad	Kinloch Brae – Broadacres Katie	Angie Kibble (Oxford)	27.17	5/1
2012	Guinness Dusty	Droopys Scolari – Kilelton Rose	Seamus Cahill (Hove)	26.87	6/1
2015	Roxholme Barkley	Droopys Scolari – Bellmore Ruby	Hayley Keightley (Private)	28.23	1/1f
2016	Charity Dragon	Dragon Shield – Arboy Niamh	Pat Rosney (Private)	28.20	3/1
2017	King Elvis	Tullymurry Act - Skate On	Liz McNair (Private)	27.96	4/6f
2018	King Sheeran	Eden The Kid - Skate On	Liz McNair (Private)	28.34	11/10
2019	Droopys Addition	Droopys Jet - Droopys Hilda	Ernest Gaskin Jr. (Private)	28.05	5/2

== Sponsors ==
- 1999–2001 (William Hill Bookmakers)
- 2002–2006 (Mike Allan Bookmakers)
- 2008–2009 (Pattinson Construction)
- 2007, 2010–2011 (Stadium Bookmakers)
- 2012–2012 (Mick Lowe)
- 2015–2018 (Kevin Perisi)
- 2019–2019 (Ladbrokes)

== Gallery ==
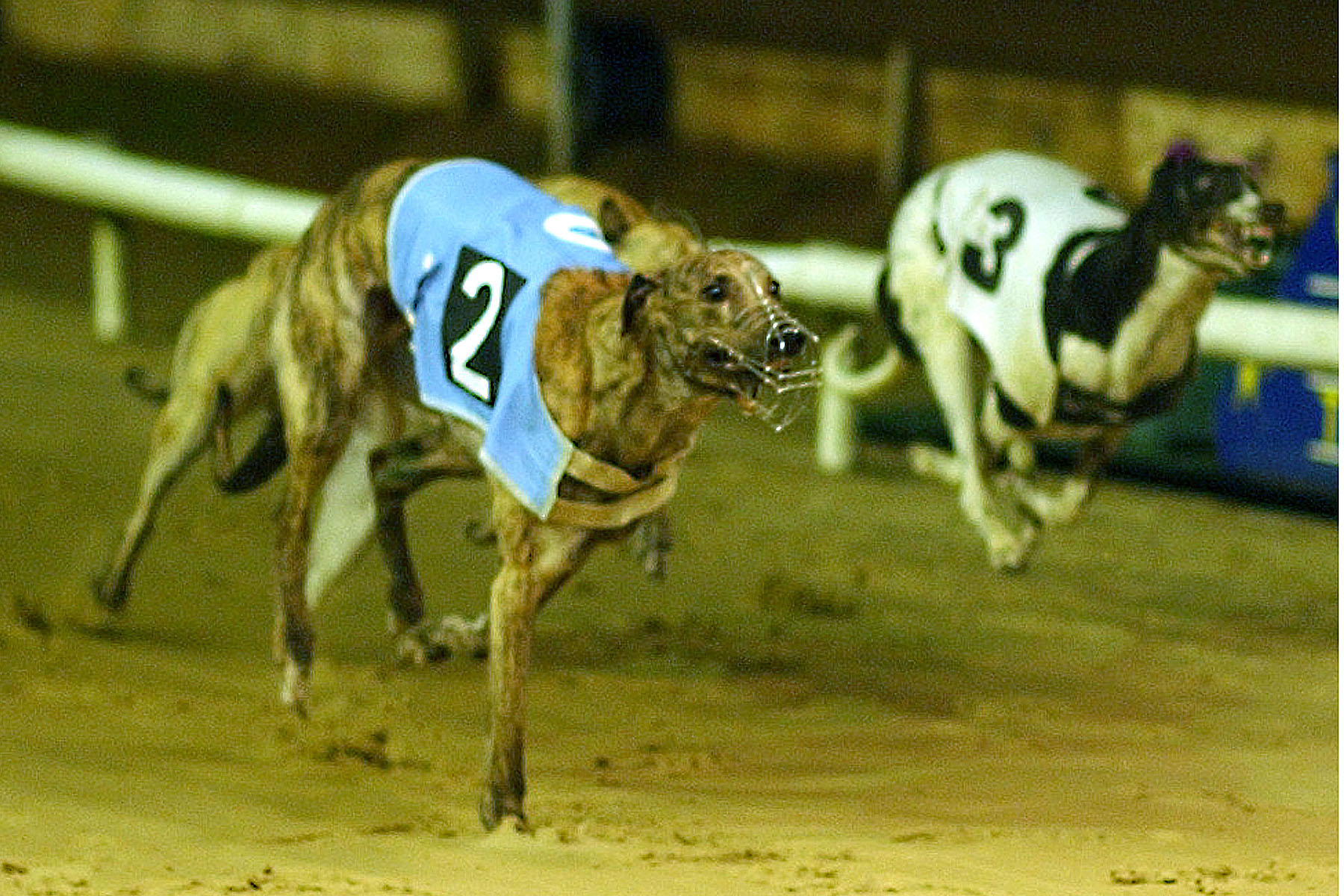
Money Sweeper

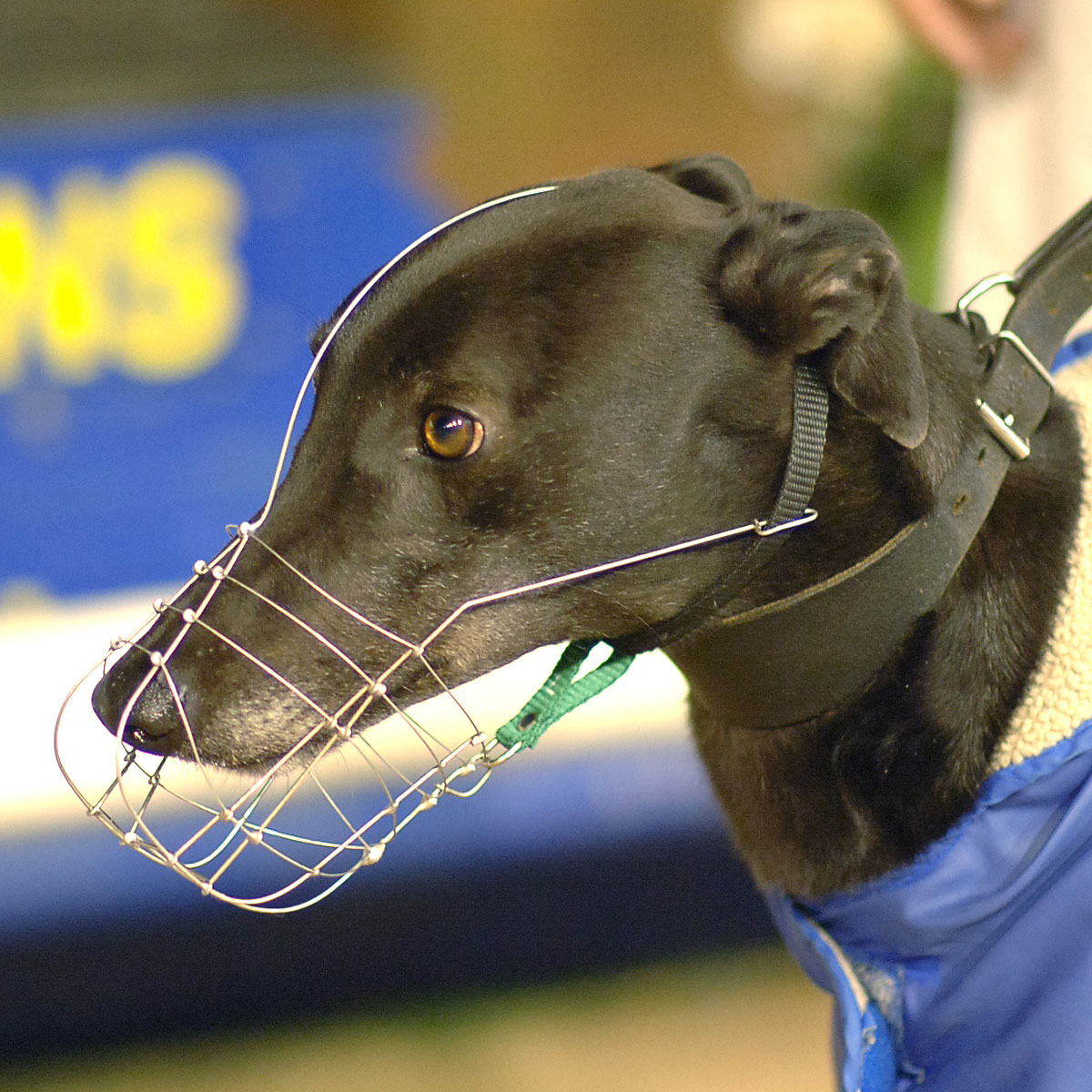
Camp Bugler on parade

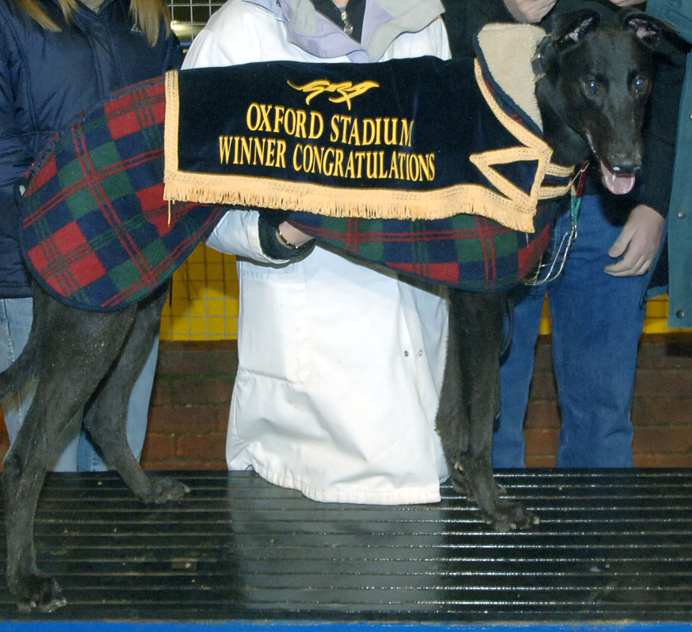
Horseshoe Ping on the podium

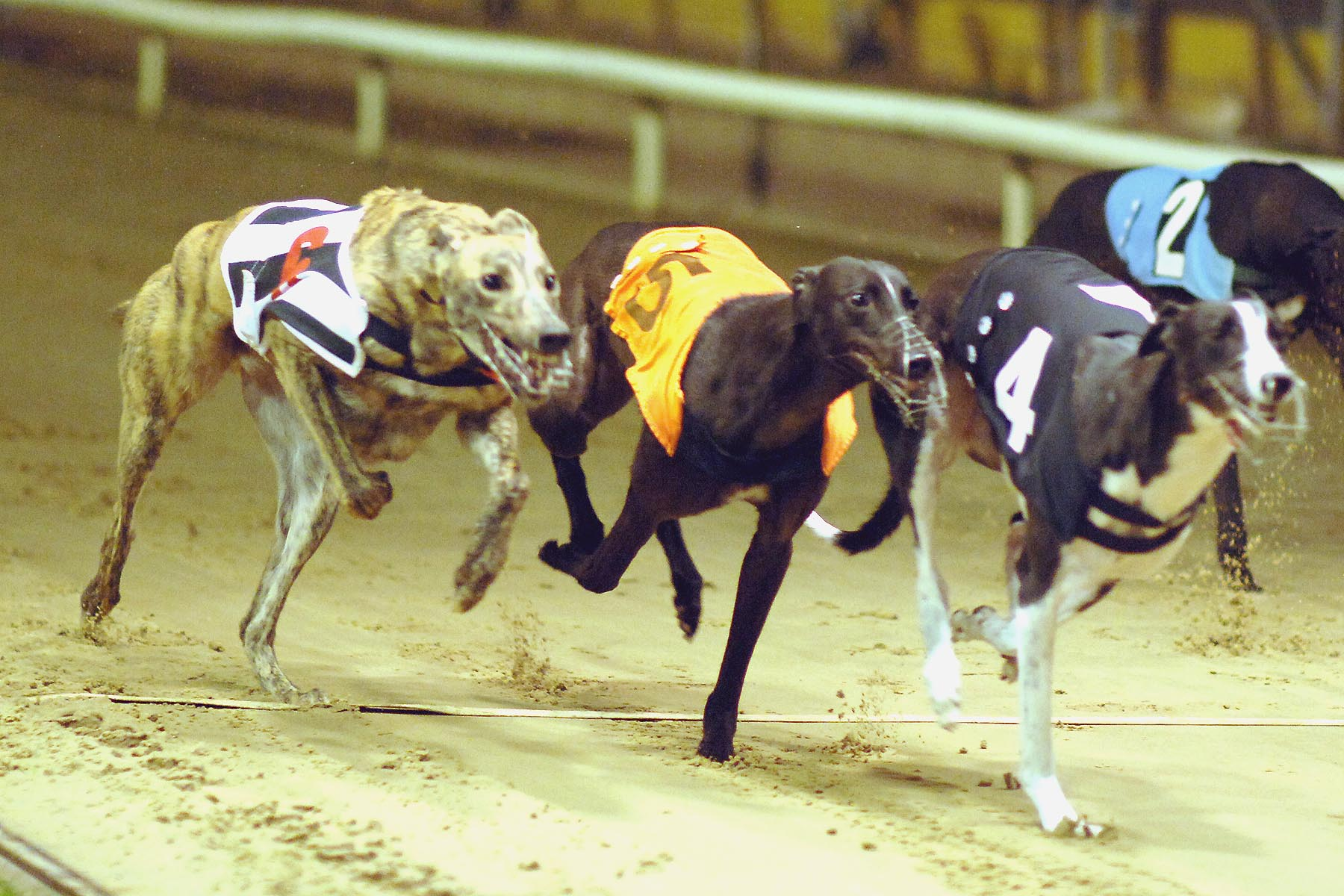
Westcountry Lady (t5) wins in 2007

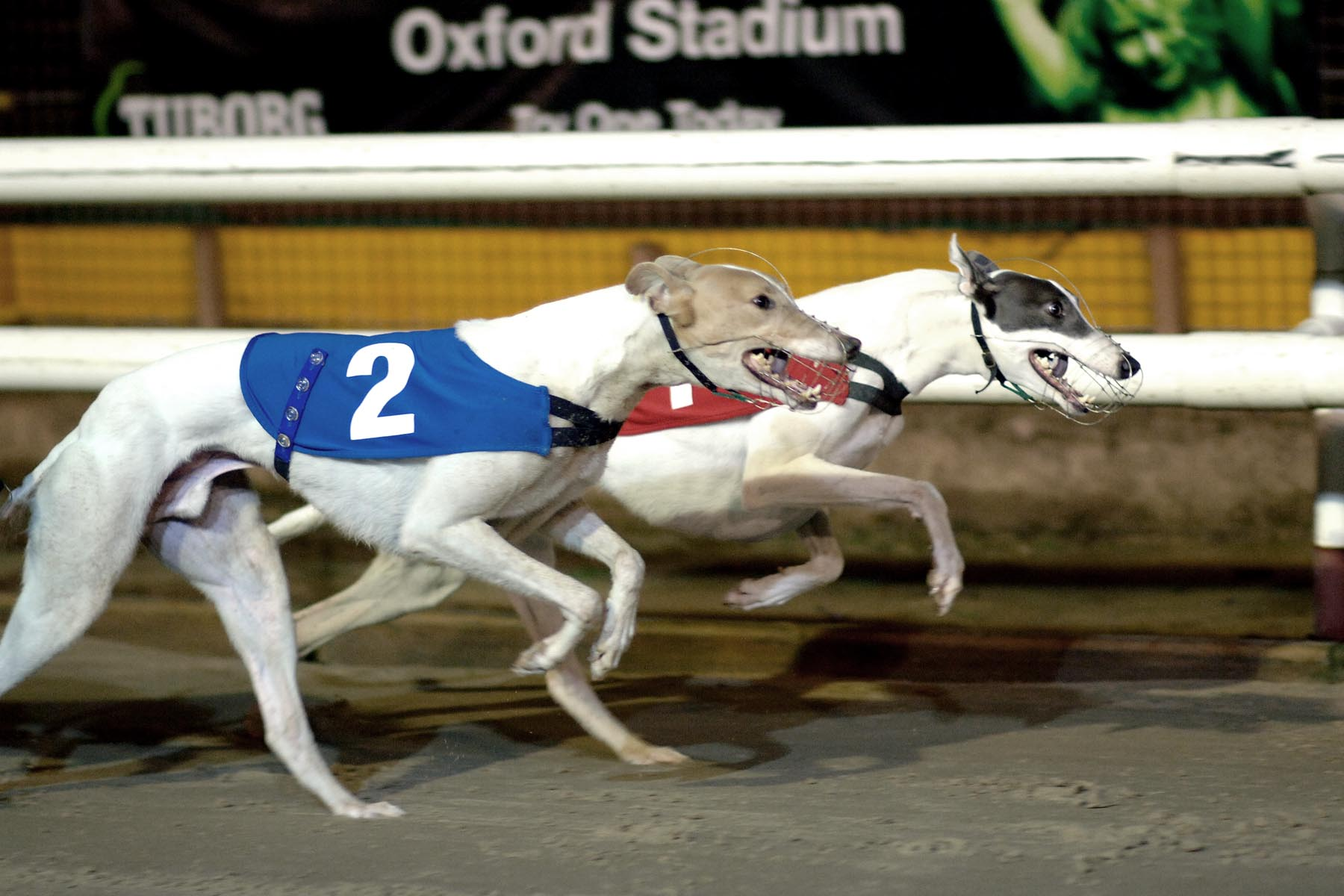
Drink Up Zorro (t1)

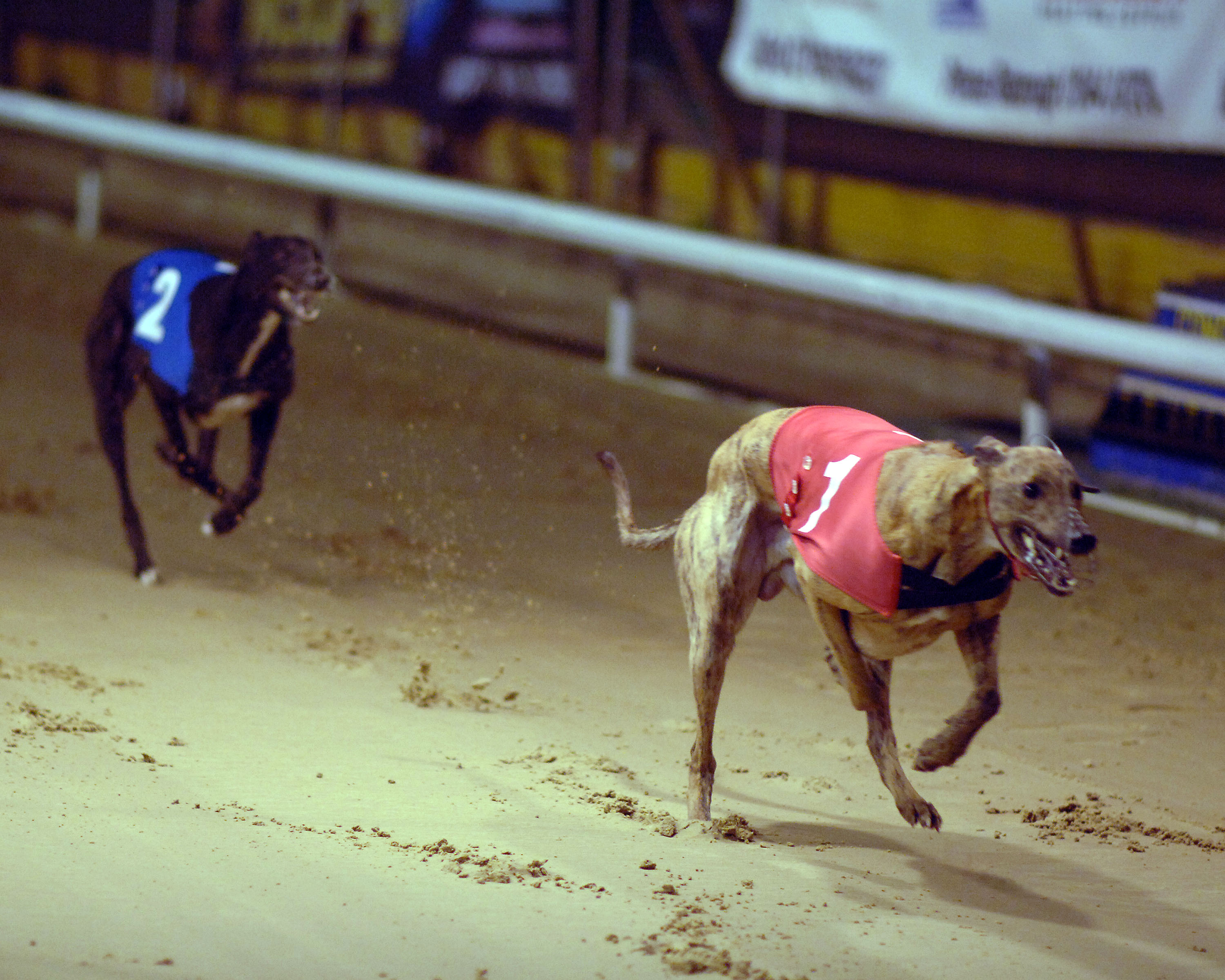
Spencers Lad wins the final
