= Two Year Old Produce Stakes =

Oxford Two Year Old Produce
- Location: Oxford Stadium
- Inaugurated: 1957
- Final run: 1975

Race information
- Distance: 450 metres
- Surface: Sand

The Two Year Old Produce Stakes was a greyhound competition held throughout Great Britain for greyhounds bred only in Great Britain. Many tracks held their own version of the event, but due to the emergence of many new competitions with more prize money on offer they were discontinued.

The Oxford Stadium event was held from 1957 until 1975.

== Past winners ==
Year	Winner	Breeding	Trainer	Time	SP	Notes
1957	Highwood Samson	Westbourne – Pretty Miss Amber	Leslie Reynolds (Wembley)	28.40 sec	5–4f	
1958	Ballyviniter Lass	Barrowside – Bluepool Sal	Jack Harvey (Wembley)	28.93 sec	5–4f	
1959	The Pieces	Barrowside – Black Eyed Susie	George Miller (Clapton)	28.40 sec	6–1	
1960	Kensington Pioneer	Kensington Prince – Ann Dell	Marjorie Phipps (Oxford)	29.00 sec	3–1	
1961	In Town Tonight	Greenane Airlines – Top and Left	Jim Irving (Private)	28.96 sec	2–5f	
1962	Daring Decoy	Northern Champion – Day Break	Jack Harvey (Wembley)	28.91 sec	4–6f	
1963	Hebes Choice	Mile Bush Pride – Rose Chandelier	Joe Pickering (White City)	28.34 sec	1–2f	
1964	Careful Choice	Low Pressure - Pluperfect	Wally Hardman (Oxford)	28.31 sec	11–2	
1965	Corrigeen Prairie	Prairie Flash – Corrigeen Belle	Jim Sherry (Reading)	28.94 sec	5–2	
1966	Marvellous Caper	Greenane Wonder – Las Palmas	Edward Brennan (Owlerton)	28.36 sec	5–4f	
1967	Lucky Me	Hook Chieftain – Avenue East	Len Drewery (Private)	28.02 sec	4-6f	
1968	Harry's Oppo	Crazy Society – Hiver Swanky	Vicky Holloway (Private)	28.22 sec	3–1	
1969	Marton Tim	Lazy Tim – Bunclody Melody	Frank Baldwin (Perry Barr)	28.30 sec	5–4f	
1970	Glen There	Lucky Hi There – Aretlla	Bernard Cousins (Oxford)	28.28 sec	1–1f	
1971	Dactars Speed	Paraire Jet – Up The Aisle	Stan Martin (Wimbledon)	28.48 sec	4–5f	
1972	Midi Tail	Careless Look – Lovely Robin	Eddie Moore (Belle Vue)	28.53 sec	2–1f	
1973	Cosmic Flash	Carry On Oregon – Farma Sally	Paddy McEvoy (Wimbledon)	28.53 sec	8–1	
1974	Clear Reason	Quiet Spring – Regal Queen	Mrs Dorin Clark (Private)	27.50 sec	10–11f	Track record
1975	Mitcham Mug	Moordyke Monalee – Hi Tide	Tom English (Private)	28.09 sec	8–13f	

== Venue ==
1957-1975 Oxford
