= Oxfordshire Stakes =

Oxfordshire Stakes may refer to:

- Geoffrey Freer Stakes, a Group 3 flat horse race in Great Britain
- Oxfordshire Stakes (greyhounds), a greyhound racing competition held in England
