= Oxfordshire Stakes (greyhounds) =

British greyhound racing competition

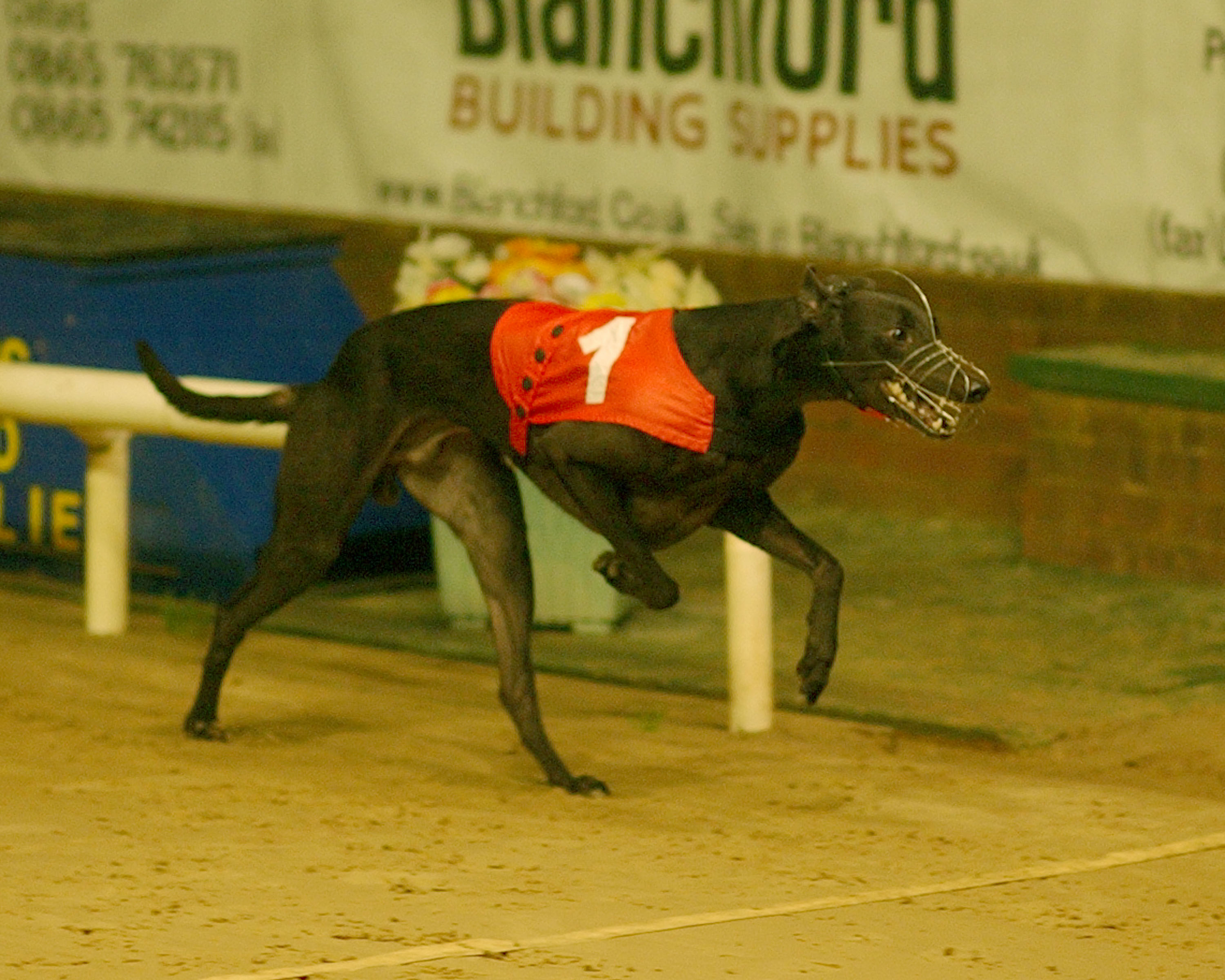
- Farloe Superb, 2005 winner
- Location: Oxford Stadium
- Inaugurated: 1964
- Final run: 2012

Race information
- Distance: 450 metres
- Surface: Sand

The Oxfordshire Stakes was a greyhound competition held at Oxford Stadium until it closed in 2012.

It was inaugurated in 1964 and was a major event in the 1960s and 1970s. It changed its name to the Oxfordshire Trophy in 1982 but reverted to its original name in 2008.

== Distances ==
- 1964–1973 (500 yards)
- 1974–1974 (490 yards)
- 1975–2012 (450 metres)

== Sponsors ==
- 1985–1985 (Hawkins of Harrow)
- 1986–1986 (Hall's Brewery Skol)
- 1987–1988 (Kent & Roberts)
- 1989–1989 (Purina)
- 1991–1993 (Graham Daniells Bookmakers)
- 1996–1997 (Sporting Life)
- 1998–1998 (Stadium Bookmakers)
- 1999–1999 (Gary Wiltshire Bookmakers)
- 2000–2001 (Jarrad Isherwood Bookmakers)
- 2002–2002 (McLeans Coaches)
- 2003–2007 (Blanchford Building Supplies)
- 2008–2009 (Property Care Complete Maintenance)
- 2011–2011 (Stadium Bookmakers)
- 2012–2012 (Blanchford Building Supplies)

== Past winners ==
| Year | Winner | Breeding | Trainer | Time | SP | Notes |
|---|---|---|---|---|---|---|
| 1964 | Thats Crazy | Crazy Parachute – How About That | Harry Sayer (Eastville) | 28.37 sec | 7/2 | |
| 1965 | Steady Singer | Oregon Prince – Angelas Fire | Ray Wilkes (Private) | 28.15 sec | 100/8 | |
| 1966 | Tornado Clipper | Crazy Parachute – Tornado Lass | Ron Chamberlain (Private) | 28.33 sec | 3/1 | |
| 1967 | Maison Fox | Prairie Flash – Parkhouse Sally | Jack Kinsley (Wembley) | 27.80 sec | 7/2 | |
| 1968 | Shady Peacock | Printers Present – Patrician Lady | Jim Todd (Kings Heath) | 28.08 sec | 100/7 | |
| 1969 | Marton Tim | Lazy Tim – Bunclody Melody | Frank Baldwin (Perry Barr) | 28.79 sec | 6/4 | |
| 1970 | Moordyke Spot | Newdown Heather – Nelsons Farewell | Stan Martin (Wimbledon) | 28.31 sec | 1/1f | |
| 1971 | Dactars Speed | Prairie Jet – Up The Aisle | Stan Martin (Wimbledon) | 28.47 sec | 7/4f | |
| 1972 | Kybo Venture | Monalee Champion – Funny Venture | Paddy Coughlan (Crayford) | 28.38 sec | 7/2 | |
| 1973 | Arctic Tern | Cahara Rover – Small Idea | Geoff De Mulder (Hall Green) | 28.33 sec | 3/1 | |
| 1974 | Crown Walter | Spectre – Clomoney Sue | Barbara Tompkins (Private) | 27.76 sec | 3–1 | |
| 1975 | By Chance | The Grand Silver – Star Brush | Terry Kibble (Eastville) | 27.76 sec | 5/4f | |
| 1976 | Mister Little | Free Speech – Milos Silver | Jim Morgan (Oxford) | 27.30 sec | 9/4 | |
| 1977 | Rathduff Spring | Quiet Spring – Tudor Reflection | Geoff De Mulder (Hall Green) | 27.03 sec | 9/4 | Track Record |
| 1978 | Ballybeg Blaze | Time Up Please – Blissful Pride | Vicky Holloway (Eastville) | 27.43 sec | 8/1 | |
| 1979 | Faoides Choice | Kuda Honour – Faoide Look | George Lynds (Coventry) | 27.27 sec | 5/2 | |
| 1980 | Deel Joker | Free Speech – Leaping Lady | John Gibbons (Crayford) | 27.66 sec | 7/2 | |
| 1981 | Bright Tiger | Sandispec – Rafa Flyer | Len Stiles (Reading) | 27.57 sec | 8/1 | |
| 1982 | In The Know | Supreme Fun – Westmead Hail | Rita Wood (Private) | 27.50 sec | 3/1 | |
| 1983 | Rathduff Tad | Ceili Band – Rathduff Gazelle | Arthur Dennis (Southend) | 27.30 sec | 11/8f | |
| 1984 | Nippy Law | Lax Law – Law Fancy | Geoff De Mulder (Nottingham) | 27.24 sec | 1/2f | |
| 1985 | Amenhotep | Aquaduct Coach – Ladys Lib | Linda Mullins (Harringay) | 27.51 sec | 6/1 | |
| 1986 | Fearless Swift | Ron Hardy – Sarahs Bunny | Geoff De Mulder (Oxford) | 27.13 sec | 15/8 | |
| 1987 | Sandwinder | Sandford – Minnesota Pixie | Vicky Holloway (Oxford) | 27.17 sec | 5/2 | |
| 1988 | Hillville Blonde | Whisper Wishes – Hillville Moth | Bertie Gaynor (Hall Green) | 27.25 sec | 4/1 | |
| 1989 | Like Gold | Daleys Gold – Lullaby Lane | Tommy Johnston (Wembley) | 27.18 sec | 9/4 | |
| 1990 | Carmels Prince | I'm Slippy – Wheres Carmel | Michael Compton (Belle Vue) | 26.72 sec | 11/10f | Track Record |
| 1991 | Munroe Zulu | Road Whisper – Dee Dees Girl | Norah McEllistrim (Wimbledon) | 27.08 sec | | |
| 1992 | Poor Brian | Poor James – Ashleigh Fairy | Ron Jeffrey (Reading) | 27.47 sec | 2/1f | |
| 1993 | Salcombe | Hygard – Micks Susie | Jack Wilson (Private) | 27.20 sec | 2/1 | |
| 1994 | Highway Leader | Leaders Best – Highway Mystery | Michael Bacon (Perry Barr) | 27.08 sec | 10/11f | |
| 1995 | Pams Spirit | Galtymore Lad – Great Swift | Jim Reynolds (Crayford) | 27.24 sec | 10/1 | |
| 1996 | Not Again | Andagain – Penny Wise | Richard Baker (Reading) | 27.25 sec | 9/2 | |
| 1997 | Droopys Tim | Leaders Best – Droopys Fiona | Tony Meek (Hall Green) | 27.41 sec | 11/8f | |
| 1998 | El Dante | Airmount Coal – Jubilee Joy | Linda Mullins (Walthamstow) | 27.19 sec | 5/1 | |
| 1999 | Call Me Up | Shanless Slippy – Midas Blue | Owen McKenna (Sittingbourne) | 26.96 sec | 7/1 | |
| 2000 | Winocals Dream | Dew Reward – Seanos Miss | Jane Marjoram (Yarmouth) | 26.65 sec | 7/2 | |
| 2001 | Bold Mossy | Larkhill Jo – Annies Bullet | Jim Reynolds (Walthamstow) | 27.08 sec | 2/1f | |
| 2002 | Lockup Firedice | Cushie Draco – Cushie Flair | Linda Mullins (Walthamstow | 27.11 sec | 6/4f | |
| 2003 | El Ronan | Staplers Jo – Freds Flame | Charlie Lister (Private) | 26.98 sec | 5/4f | |
| 2004 | Yankey Dick | Mustang Yank – Ard Lightning | Mick Puzey (Walthamstow) | 27.16 sec | 3/1 | |
| 2005 | Farloe Superb | Droopys Woods – Farloe Twin | Patrick Curtin (Oxford) | 26.75 sec | 9/4jf | |
| 2006* | Mahers Boy | Tucks Mein – Rons Luck | Elaine Parker (Owlerton) | 26.54 sec | 9/4f | |
| 2007 | Brickfield Class | Boherduff Light – Kehers Friend | Bob Gilling (Reading) | 26.55 sec | 6/4f | |
| 2008 | Star Of Twilight | Larkhill Lo - Droopys Scary | Paul Sallis (Hall Green | 26.75 sec | 11/10f | |
| 2009 | Jolly Poacher | Droopys Cahill – Miss Regina | Richard Yeates (Oxford) | 26.70 sec | 4/5f | |
| 2011 | Ballymac Denis | Ballymac Maeve – Ballymac Peg | Stuart Buckland (Monmore) | 26.89 sec | 3/1 | |
| 2012 | Warning Sign | Droopys Scolari - Dooey Lemon | Darren Whitton (Private) | 26.96 sec | 4/1 | |

Discontinued

== Notes ==
- 2006 event delayed - held during Feb 2007
- 2010 Not held

== Gallery ==
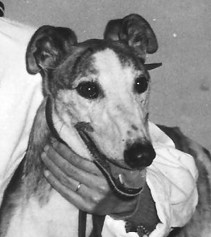
1968 Oxfordshire Stakes champion Shady Peacock

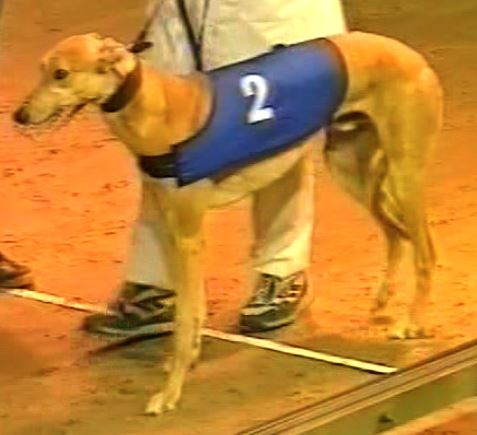
1987 winner Sandwinder

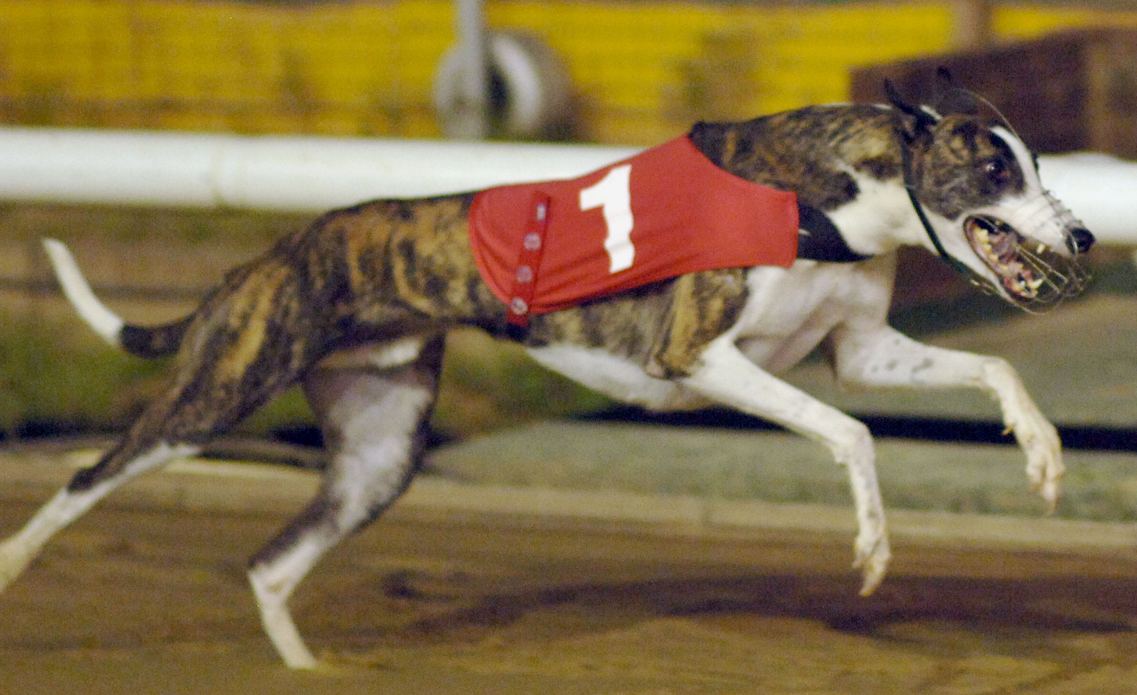
2009 champion Jolly Poacher

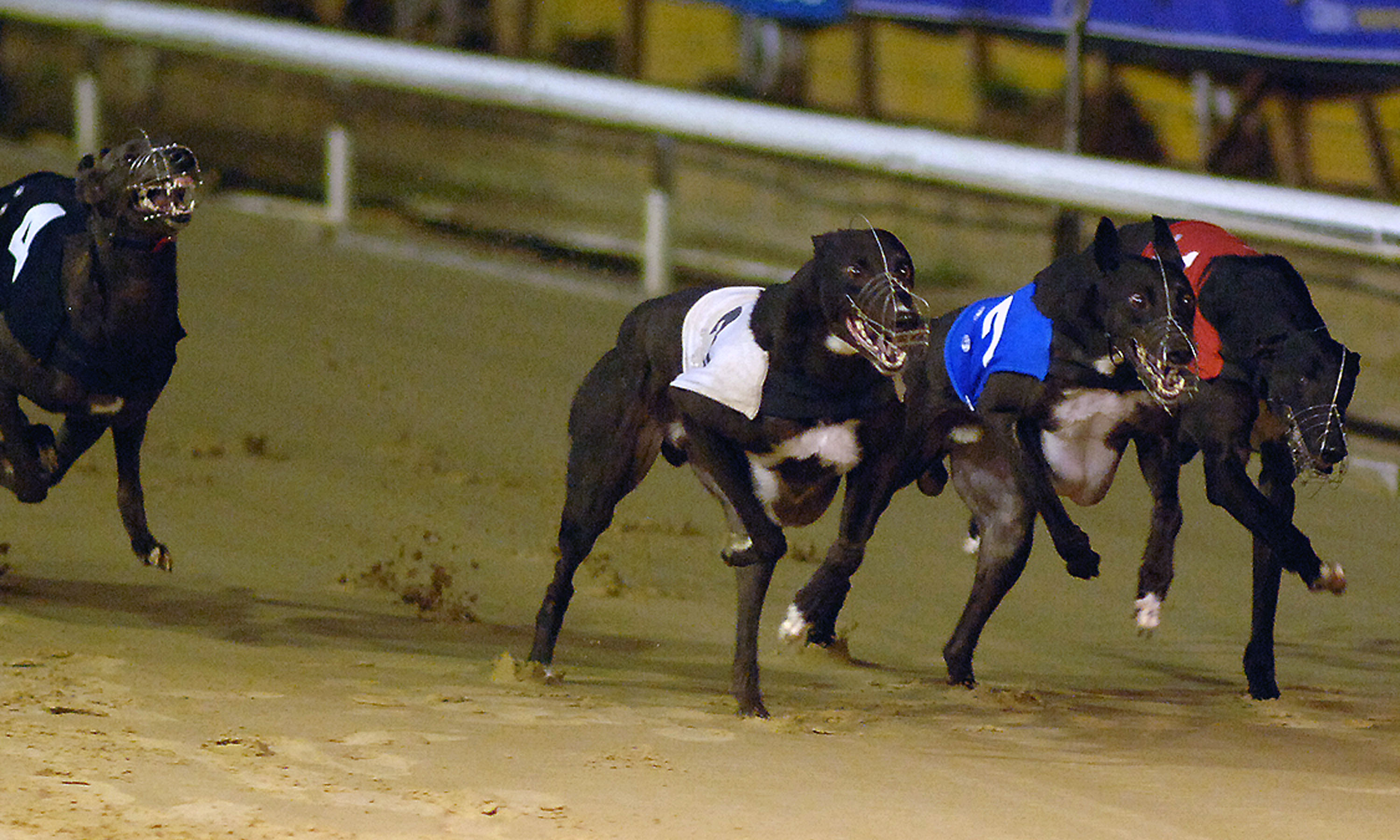
2012 semi final Zodiac Zeus (t2) beats Warning Sign (t3)
