= Peter Billingham =

English footballer and greyhound trainer (1938–2019)

Personal information
- Date of birth: 8 October 1938
- Place of birth: Pensnett, West Midlands, England
- Date of death: August 2019 (aged 80)
- Position: Wing-half

Senior career*
Years	Team	Apps	(Gls)
1955-1959	Walsall	99	(9)
1960-1960	West Bromwich Albion	7	(0)
- * Club domestic league appearances and goals

Peter Arnold Billingham (1938-2019) was a greyhound trainer and an English professional footballer.

== Football career ==
Billingham was associated with Worcester City F.C., Brierley Hill Alliance F.C. and Hednesford Town F.C. before making his professional debut for Walsall during October 1955 and played 99 times for the club. He was transferred to West Bromwich Albion for £7,000 in May 1960.

== Greyhound racing career ==
After retiring from football Billingham pursued a career in greyhound racing. He became a trainer and had a career that lasted over forty years until he retired in 2008 and handed the kennels to his daughter Kim. He trained out of the Swindon near Dudley kennels and was contracted at Kings Heath, Cradley, Norton Canes and a long association with Monmore Green Stadium.

Some of his highlights included reaching the 2007 Oaks final and training Honeygar Bell, who broke the Oxford Stadium track record and receiving a lifetime achievement award in 2008, at the Midland Greyhound Ball at the NEC Hilton Metropole, Birmingham.
