= Oxford Stadium =

Greyhound racing & motorcycle speedway venue in Oxfordshire, England

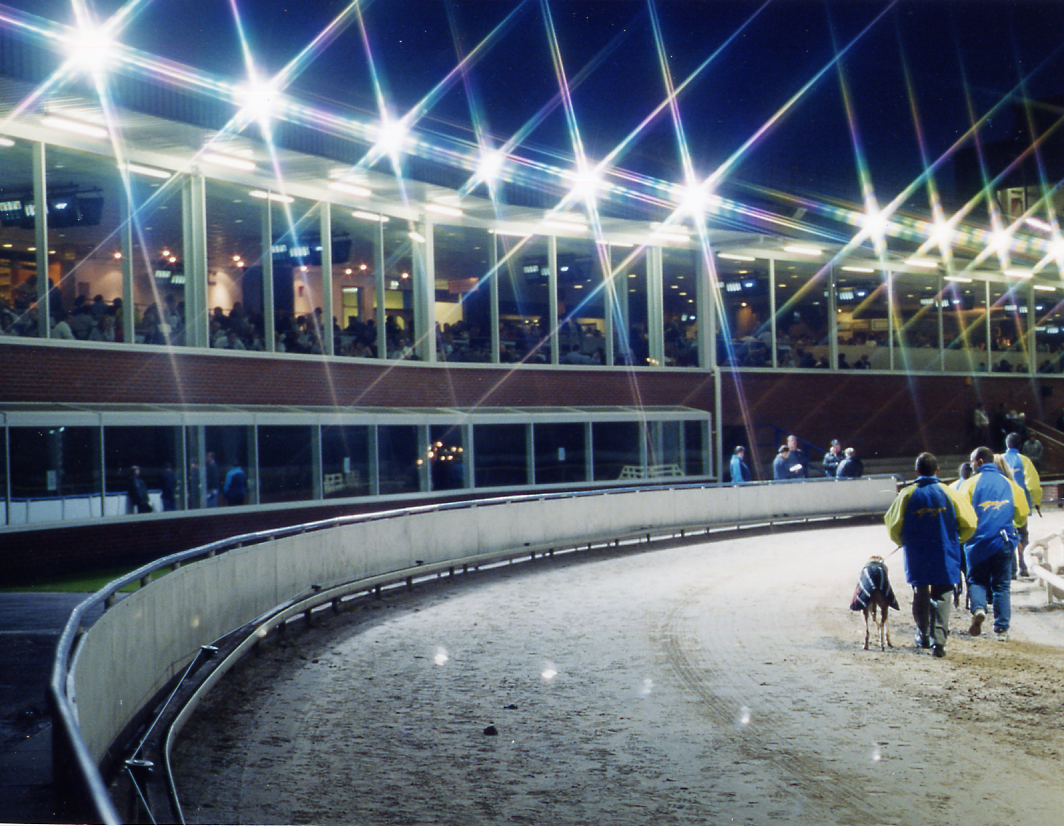
- The new grandstand in 2000
- Interactive map of Oxford Stadium
- Location: Sandy Lane, Cowley, Oxfordshire, OX4 6LJ
- Coordinates: 51°43′35″N 1°12′1″W
- Owner: Galliard Homes
- Operator: Kevin Boothby
- Capacity: 3000
- Surface: Sand

Construction
- Opened: 31 March 1939
- Renovated: 1986
- Expanded: 2000

Website
- Official website

Oxford Stadium is a greyhound racing and speedway venue in Oxford, located in Sandy Lane, Cowley.

As of 2024, greyhound races are held on Monday, Friday and Saturday with speedway meetings held on Wednesday, Thursday and Sunday.

Races were historically held every Tuesday, Thursday and Saturday evening with afternoon BAGS (Bookmakers Afternoon Greyhound Service) racing on Friday and Sunday. Race evenings also included Fridays at various times throughout the history of the stadium.

== Stadium facilities ==
The stadium has a 350-seater grandstand restaurant overlooking the track, with three executive suites and several large general public areas. Conference and business facilities were also available.

== Origins ==
The stadium was constructed in 1938 on the site of a 'flapping' (unregulated) track where owners could turn up and run their greyhounds around an oval on the days selected for racing. The rear wheel of a jacked up motor car was used to drive the lure around the track. The location on Sandy Lane, in Cowley, Oxfordshire is a short walk from the famous Oxford motor factories built by Morris Motors.

The back straight was adjacent to the Great Western Railway Thame Branch line (now the BMW freight line). A main grandstand building was erected and the stadium joined the regulatory governing body of the National Greyhound Racing Club (NGRC). The owner of the land at the time was a Mr Johnson, and he agreed a 99-year lease with Mr Leslie Vernon Calcutt.

== Speedway ==
Oxford Stadium is home to Oxford Speedway and its three teams (Oxford Spires, Oxford Cheetahs and Oxford Chargers).

Speedway has been an integral part of the stadium and was run every year from 1939 up to 2008 and again from 2022 until present. The team known as the Oxford Cheetahs won the United Kingdom's premier competition five times. They were champions in 1964, 1985, 1986, 1989 and 2001. Speedway returned to Oxford Stadium in 2022 with the Cheetahs competing in the SGB Championship 2022.

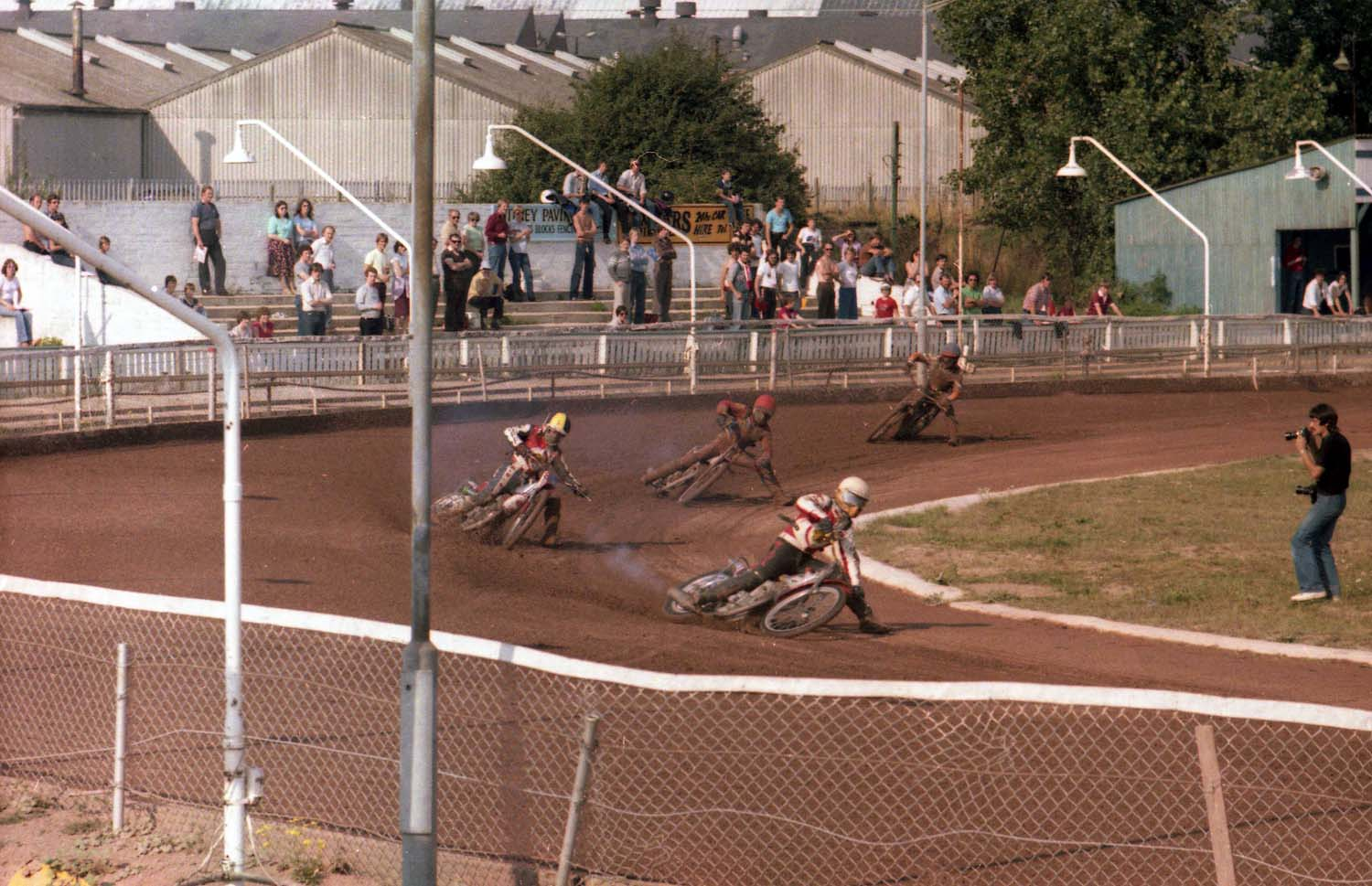
Speedway at Oxford Stadium

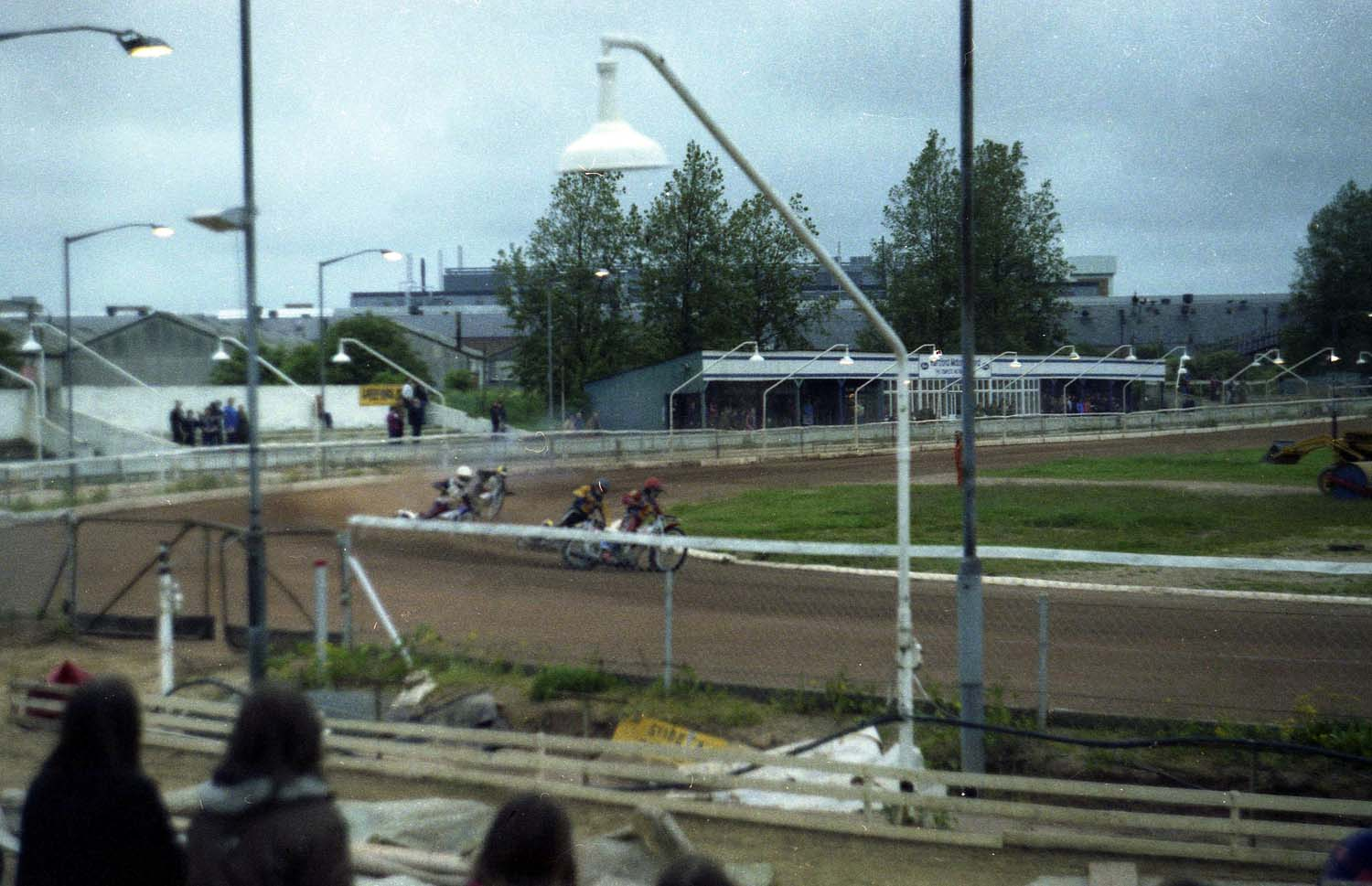
Speedway at Oxford in 1981

== Greyhound racing ==
=== Opening ===
The inaugural race night was on 31 March 1939 and the stadium was officially opened by Lord Denham with races over 310, 525 and 735 yards. The track trainers were Bill Davies, Bill Higgins, Paddy Mullins and Mr Preston. The first race was won by Hunting Snipe, the 2-1 favourite.

=== 1940s ===
During World War II the track closed and reopened on several occasions, but generally raced on Saturday afternoons. In 1941 Leslie Calcutt purchased Irish Grand National winner 'The Gunner' for £400 and the Jack Young trained hurdler won 11 successive open races, drawing in large crowds. In 1943 Dark Tiger won the Trafalgar Cup.

In 1944 a fire destroyed the main stand: it was reported that a newspaper had blown onto a heater. Also in 1944 Winnie of Berrow won the Eclipse Stakes.

The track was described as a good size course with a good run-up to the first bend. The hare system was an 'Inside McWhirter track-less' and race distances were now 290, 455, 500 and 715 yards. There were kennel facilities on site for 132 greyhounds; fees were charged at one guinea per week, i.e. three shillings per day. Amenities included the Oxford Stadium club five shilling enclosure, Oxford Stadium racing club 2s 3d enclosure.

In 1947 Calcutt was appointed as Director of Bristol Greyhound Racing Association Ltd and one year later Narrogar Ann won the Western Two-Year Old Produce Stakes.

=== 1950s ===
In the summer of 1952 Calcutt fell ill and had to go to hospital for a major operation. Whilst recuperating at Acland nursing home he suffered a relapse and died on 3 August aged just 49. The Bristol Greyhound Racing Association was soon to change their name to Bristol Stadium Ltd and they took control of Oxford following the death of Calcutt. Kensington Perfection won the 1952 British Breeders Produce Stakes Finals at Catford Stadium and Stamford Bridge and the 1953 Eastville Stadium Produce Stakes and Regency.

Owner-trainers were allowed to race their greyhounds at the track; these included Paddy Sweeney, a respected veterinary surgeon. In 1957 Racing Manager John Hare introduced the Two Year Old Produce Stakes. Bill Higgins (10) and Jack Young (9) won the first 19 Oxford trainer championship titles between them from 1939 to 1957. Higgins died in 1958 and was replaced by Joe Farrand for a second spell at Oxford.

=== 1960s ===
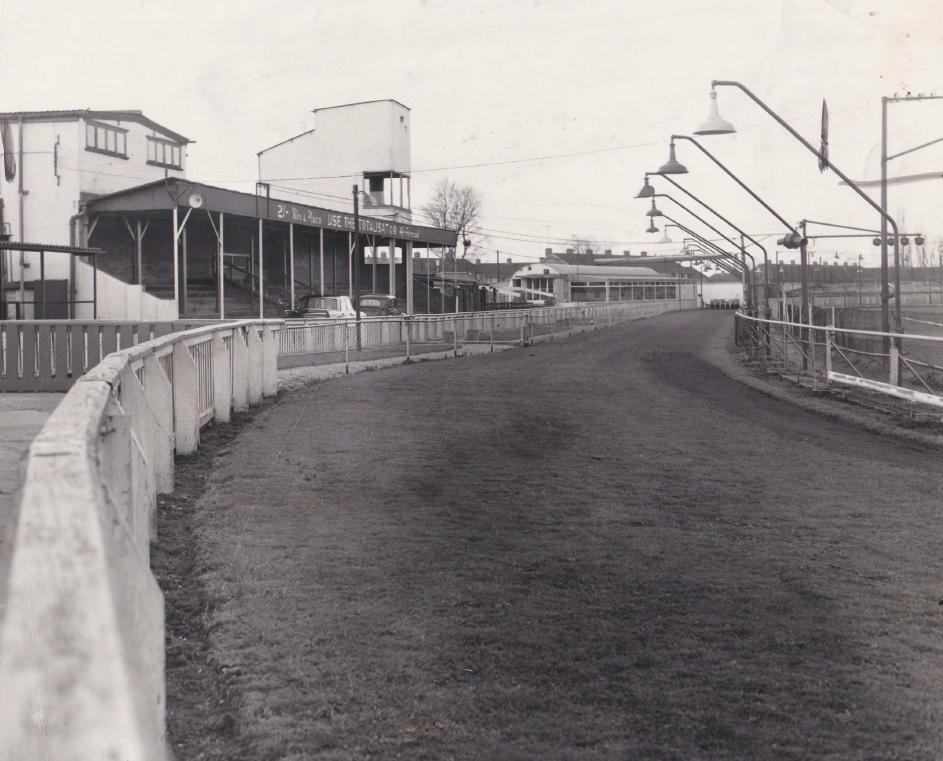
Oxford Stadium c.1960

Drum Major II recorded a fiftieth track win in 1961 and in 1964 the Oxfordshire Stakes was introduced. In 1967 Oxford was one of the first four tracks to be awarded an inaugural BAGS (Bookmakers Afternoon Greyhound Service) contract along with Hackney, Kings Heath and Park Royal. The decade ended with new investment which saw a new supporters club building constructed, it would be used for functions.

=== 1970s ===
Perth Pat trained by Jim Morgan brought the first ever classic race success to Oxford following her win in the 1970 Oaks. In the same year Henry Kibble secured a tenth track trainers title. In 1974 a new 'Outside Sumner' hare system was introduced but the following year Bristol Stadium Ltd agreed a deal worth £235,000 with the Oxford City Council housing committee. A group formed SOS (Save Our Stadium) and a petition with 27,000 names was lodged with the council. Local MP Michael Heseltine called for a public meeting which gave SOS the chance to find a buyer. The stadium closed on 31 December 1975 until further notice but reopened during March 1976 and eventually found a buyer in 1977 when Northern Sports purchased the track for £250,000. The threat of permanent closure had been prevented by David Hawkins the managing director of Northern Sports.

=== 1980s ===
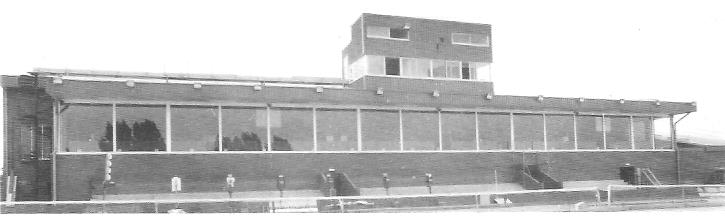
The new grandstand in 1986

The resident kennels were demolished in 1980 because the contract trainers were now employed and one of the trainers called Jack Coker reached the final of the 1980 English Greyhound Derby with Young Breeze. In 1981 Careless Dragon trained by Jim Morgan won the Trafalgar Cup one year before Northern Sports announced plans to invest heavily into Oxford and sister track Ramsgate Stadium. Mick Wheble arrived as Racing Manager in 1984, Joe Farrand retired after 45 years as a trainer and Arthur Hitch won the 1984 BBC TV Trophy with Weston Prelude.

The investment promised came to fruition in 1986 when Northern Sports spent £1.5 million on a new three tier grandstand restaurant and sports centre including squash courts, a snooker club, gymnasium, sauna and various other facilities. The stadium underwent considerable success with significant increases in attendances and totalisator turnover. Charity events featured appearances from Desert Orchid, Bob Champion, Henry Cooper, Jenny Pitman and many others. The sports leading trainer Geoff De Mulder joined the track and the speedway team became the leading team in the United Kingdom with four times World Champion Hans Nielsen as their captain.

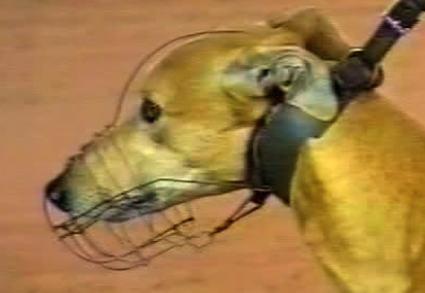
Sandwinder

In 1987 Sandwinder trained by Vicky Holloway became the track champion and in 1988 the Pall Mall Stakes was switched from the closing Harringay Stadium to Oxford. The first running was won by Fearless Ace and the winning trophy was presented by George Best. As the 1980s ended Maurice Massey won a fifth trainers track title.

=== 1990s ===
The recent success had made Oxford one of the leading tracks in the UK outside its major conurbations and the first ever Derby success came in 1994 when Ringa Hustle trained by Tony Meek won the 1994 English Greyhound Derby. Kind of Magic won the 1993 Scurry Gold Cup for Litzi Miller who herself would win eight trainers titles.

However, as the 90s progressed Northern Sports parent company Hawkins of Harrow were beginning to suffer from the recession that was affecting their other business interests in construction and garden centres and in 1995 Hawkins of Harrow called in the receivers and Oxford was made a going concern. The stadium attracted a list of potential buyers but it was Donald Joyce a former member of SOS who purchased the stadium in 1996 and then sold it on for a considerable profit to the Greyhound Racing Association (GRA) in 1999.

=== 2000–2012 ===
The GRA made immediate changes with a new multimillion-pound extension completed during 2000. The old supporters club had been demolished making way for an extension to the grandstand restaurant and addition of three large executive suites. In addition there was a new racing surface and Swaffham hare system costing a further £130,000. The circumference of the track remained at 395 metres, with race distances of 250, 450, 595, 645 and 845 metres.

A classic race called the Cesarewitch switched to Oxford from Catford in 2001 and the major competitions were screened live on SKY television. Angie Kibble won six trainers titles and traditional boxing day meetings continued to draw in a capacity attendance from the local population. The stadium continued to be frequented by the famous which included Ant & Dec, Zara Phillips and Vinnie Jones.

=== Closure 2012–2020 ===
The closure of the stadium was sealed when GRA's parent company Wembley plc was broken apart and GRA were subject to a takeover by Risk Capital Partners with development partner Galliard Homes in 2005 for £52.4m. Plans for 150 houses and 75 flats were mooted but the council publicly stated they were in favour of keeping the site for leisure use. The racing continued for seven years until the GRA closed the stadium; the last greyhound meeting was held on 29 December 2012, with the last winner being Moorstown Mystiq.

=== 2022–present ===
The stadium reopened (on a 10-year lease, under Kevin Boothby) on Wednesday 13 April 2022 with a speedway meeting. Greyhound racing recommenced on Friday 2 September 2022. The stadium took on the Hunt Cup competition in 2023.

=== Competitions ===
Current

- The prestigious Pall Mall Stakes (450m)
- The Hunt Cup (650m)

Former

- The original classic race The Cesarewitch (645m, 2001–2012)
- The Trafalgar Cup for puppies (450m, 1999–2012)
- The Oxfordshire Stakes (Greyhounds) (450m, 1964–2012)
- The Oxfordshire Gold Cup (450m, 1985–2012)
- The Two Year Old Produce Stakes (450m, 1957–1975)

== Track details ==
=== Current track records ===
Metres	Greyhound	Time	Date
253	Coolavanny Finn	14.78	22 April 2023
450	Coolavanny Shado	26.49	4 August 2023
650	Havana Top Note	39.29	8 December 2023
847	Bubbly Inferno	52.37	23 March 2024

=== Previous track records pre-metric ===
Extended content

Yards	Greyhound	Time	Trainer	Date
290	Golden Monarch II	16.26	Mrs.V.Bevis	17 July 948
290	Gortnagory	16.16	P.J.Power	18 September 1948
310	Hunting Castle	17.86	Bill Higgins	10 April 1939
310	Oldcastletown Hope	17.52	Jimmy Rimmer	13 April 1939
310	Manhattan Mercury	17.48	Bill Savage	19 May 1939
310	Hot Knight	17.44	Philip Dooley	27 June 1939
310	John Reaper	17.36	Jack Young	20 September 1940
310	Galtee Ham	17.36	Bill Davies	9 November 1940
310	Galtee Ham	17.28	Bill Davies	23 November 1940
310	Black Invasion	17.26	Bill Higgins	24 May 1947
455	Earl of Kilally	26.22	Reg Holland	24 July 1948
455	Lucky Stoker	26.15	Bill Gigg	24 August 1948
455	Knocker's Latest	26.00	J.P.H.Bott	7 September 1948
475	Lord Peter	27.88	Jack Young	24 March 1945
475	Sound Touch	27.59	Jack Young	7 April 1945
475	Anglesey Angel	27.45	Paddy Boyle	14 June 1945
475	Special Display	27.40	Unknown	1945
475	Please Peter	27.39	G Scadgell	5 August 1946
475	Please Peter	27.22	G Scadgell	5 August 1946
475	Rushbrooke Bob	27.04	Stan Raymond	23 August 1946
500	Colin Ranger	28.60	Norman Merchant	3 July 1948
500	Pembroke Fair	28.32	Jack Young	6 July 1948
500	Patsys Record	28.24	Fred Farey	13 July 1948
500	Pembroke Fair	28.15	Jack Young	13 July 1948
500	Don Gipsey	28.04	Leslie Reynolds	14 September 1948
500	Kensington Perfection	28.25*	Bill Higgins	11 May 1954
500	Lauradella Champion	28.19	Unknown	1963
500	Lindsay Sue	28.12	Henry Kibble	20 August 1965
500	Tony's Blaze	28.10	Frank White	20 August 1965
500	Orphan Swan	28.10	Paddy McEvoy	27 August 1965
500	That's Airy	28.01	Geoff De Mulder	19 August 1966
500	Laughing Flame	27.94	Peter Collett	19 August 1966
500	Tell Nobody	27.88	Eric Adkins	19 August 1966
500	Lucky Me	27.87	Len Drewery	4 July 1967
500	Lucky Me	27.79	Len Drewery	7 July 1967
500	Billy The Mink	27.74	Cutler	18 August 1967
500	Discretions	27.70	David Geggus	23 August 1968
525	Connors Company	30.05	Paddy Mullins	14 April 1939
525	Grosvenor Friendship	30.05	Jim Syder Sr.	26 July 1940
525	Much Jay	29.99	Bill Davies	13 June 1941
525	Whitey Marsh	29.95	Jack Young	10 March 1945
525	Garnaman Invader	29.85	Bill Higgins	17 March 1945
525	Winnie of Berrow	29.84	Joe Farrand	20 July 1945
525	Good West End	29.84	Bill Higgins	28 April 1946
525	Ryans Rose	29.78	Jack Young	17 May 1946
525	Latest Surprise	29.55	Lilah Shennan	16 August 1947
715	Northam Star	41.18	Leslie Reynolds	6 July 1948
715	Come Up First	40.72	Bob Burls	13 July 1948
715	Carmen Lad	40.95+	Unknown	9 August 1964
715	Loyal Blue	40.89	George Waterman	3 May 1963
735	Duke McNab	42.80	Bill Davies	10 April 1939 dh
735	Courtenay Nigger	42.80	Paddy Mullins	10 April 1939 dh
735	Milton Maggie	42.25	Culley	21 April 1939
735	Nazeing Ambitious	43.39	Unknown	1946
735	Mischievous Red	43.20	C Crowley	20 August 1946
735	Mayfair Mite	42.92	Leslie Reynolds	26 June 1948
915	Jesters King	54.54	Unknown	7 April 1964
500 H	Muncross Dan	29.95	Hugh Kennedy	26 August 1949
500 H	Outlaw O'Leer	29.59	Jack Chadwick	19 June 1954
500 H	Outlaw O'Leer	29.48	Jack Chadwick	27 May 1955
500 H	Drealistown Leader	29.60+	Ernie Westcott	3 May 1963
525 H	Brindled Beggar	30.91	Culley	30 June 1939
525 H	Gypsy Win	30.82	W Franks	26 April 1943
525 H	What A Lad	30.70	Jack Young	25 September 1943
525 H	Baytown Brougham	30.60	Bill Higgins	21 April 1945

+After the introduction of ray timing

=== Previous track records post-metric until 2012 ===
Extended content

Yards	Greyhound	Time	Trainer	Date
250	Start Again	15.61	Jim Morgan	25 March 1977
250	Tonapandy	15.31	Maurice Massey	3 February 1979
250	Ballybeg Sailor	15.29	Vicky Holloway	1984
250	Westmead Account	15.28	Terry Atkins	5 October 1985
250	Hardy Champ	15.10	Geoff De Mulder	23 November 1985
250	Rapid Mover	15.10	John Wiseman	23 June 1987
250	Debbys Lad	14.96	Tony Meek	28 October 1988
250	Kirks Late Again	14.95	Gloria Stringer	10 May 2005
250	Ballymac Gloria	14.88	Nick Colton	14 April 2006
250	Blonde Chico	14.76	John Mullins	12 June 2007
250	Jacksheaboy	14.71	Afzal Ali	8 April 2008
250	Miss Lee	14.65	David Pruhs	24 March 2009
450	Clear Reason	27.50	Mrs Dorin Clark	12 July 1974
450	By Chance	27.32	Henry Kibble	3 October 1975
450	Dale Silver	27.30	Jim Morgan	4 May 1976
450	Oulartwick Kybo	27.19	Unknown	1976
450	Greenfield Fox	27.18	Terry O'Sullivan	4 October 1977
450	Rathduff Spring	27.13	Geoff De Mulder	7 October 1977
450	Rathduff Spring	27.03	Geoff De Mulder	14 October 1977
450	First General	26.97	Tommy Johnston	5 October 1979
450	Nippy Law	26.90	Geoff De Mulder	29 September 1984
450	Parkers Sage	26.89	Bertie Gaynor	28 September 1985
450	Local Fan	26.87	Derek Law	28 June 1988
450	Money Matters	26.81	Geoff De Mulder	27 August 1988
450	Fearless Ace	26.80	Theo Mentzis	25 March 1989
450	Carmels Prince	26.72	Michael Compton	20 October 1990
450	Droopys Eric	26.64	Henry Tasker	14 March 1998
450	Seskin Judy	26.62	Angie Kibble	17 March 1998
450	Lets Go Ebby	26.61	Tony Meek	17 March 1998
450	Farloe Club	26.57	Terry Dartnall	17 March 2000
450	Droopys Keegan	26.57	Brian Clemenson	9 December 2003
450	Paramount Silver	26.37	Paul Liddle	1 April 2005
450	Up For Sam	26.20	Carol Weatherall	11 February 2010
595	Black Toto	37.51	Gilly Hepden	24 May 2001
595	Graceful Amy	37.34	Steve Davis	29 May 2001
595	Magpie Express	36.91	Ron Bicknell	23 June 2001
595	El Tara	36.75	Angie Kibble	14 August 2001
595	Easy Dilemma	36.70	Angie Kibble	17 August 2002
595	Greenacre Lin	36.36	Brian Clemenson	20 May 2004
595	Little Honcho	36.18	Linda Pruhs	5 February 2005
595	Bower Turbo	35.87	Richard Yeates	25 March 2008
645	Black Beetle	40.93	Henry Kibble	11 May 1976
645	Hunscote Dan	40.80	Brian Price	31 May 1976
645	Black Beetle	40.21	Henry Kibble	8 June 1976
645	Hunscote Dan	40.19	Brian Price	7 September 1976
645	Ballybeg Delight	39.92	Vicky Holloway	13 October 1979
645	Lugwardine Lord	39.70	Ann Finch	7 October 1986
645	Run Free	39.46	Tony Meek	11 November 1986
645	Aztec Sun	39.39	Nick Savva	22 March 1998
645	Black Pear	39.36	Wayne Wrighting	5 August 2004
645	Primitive Way	38.98	David Pruhs	25 March 2008
845	Donovans Bar	54.61	Des Ellington	1975
845	Askinvillar King	54.29	J Hammond	18 March 1977
845	Gan On Rita	54.19	Ted Dickson	10 November 1979
845	Gan On Rita	53.90	Ted Dickson	25 April 1980
845	Crickets Delight	53.49	Vicky Holloway	17 September 1982
845	Jaroadel	52.91	Bertie Gaynor	20 August 1986
845	Tralee Crazy	52.16	Nick Savva	22 March 1998
1040	Honeygar Belle	67.63	Peter Billingham	14 November 1989
450 H	Right Arkle	28.42	Ted Dickson	10 November 1979
450 H	Hunday Doss	28.35	Unknown	1980
450 H	Shyan Trader	28.19	Phil Rees	1980
450 H	Tom View Yard	28.19	Unknown	1981
450 H	Cushie Sandy	28.19	Paddy McEvoy	2 April 1982
450 H	Growing Power	28.05	Norah McEllistrim	1983
450 H	Burgess Rocket	27.85	Jim Morgan	5 October 1985
450 H	Trelawney	27.81	Vicky Holloway	18 February 1987
450 H	Cygnet Man	27.49	Tommy Foster	10 January 1989
450 H	Faoides Country	27.47	Terry Kibble	24 August 1991
450 H	Lord Pat	27.34	Ron Bicknell	7 March 2000
450 H	Enjoy Your Luck	27.32	Jason Foster	18 July 2000
450 H	Born To Go	27.25	Tommy Foster	14 August 2001
450 H	Druids Mickey Jo	27.12	Seamus Cahill	5 April 2005
645 H	Keen Fowler	41.89	Andy Agnew	14 May 1982
645 H	Monarch Tom	41.63	Norah McEllistrim	19 January 1985
645 H	Trap Flier	41.45	Norah McEllistrim	19 July 1988
645 H	Mixer Mick	41.17	Gordon Hodson	25 October 1988
645 H	Cygnet Man	40.96	Tommy Foster	7 February 1989
645 H	Bozy Blue Blaze	40.94	John Mullins	6 February 2001

=== Previous track records since 2022 ===
Extended content

Metres	Greyhound	Time	Date
847	Space Jet	53.04	1 January 2023
847	Ballymac Taylor	52.90	1 March 2024
847	Savana Jazz	52.72	16 March 2024
847	Ballymac Taylor	52.54	16 March 2024

=== Track Dimensions ===
- NE bend 108 metres
- SE straight 81 metres
- SW bend 109 metres
- NW straight 81 metres
- Total 379 metres
