= Reading Stadium (Oxford Road) =

British greyhound racing venue

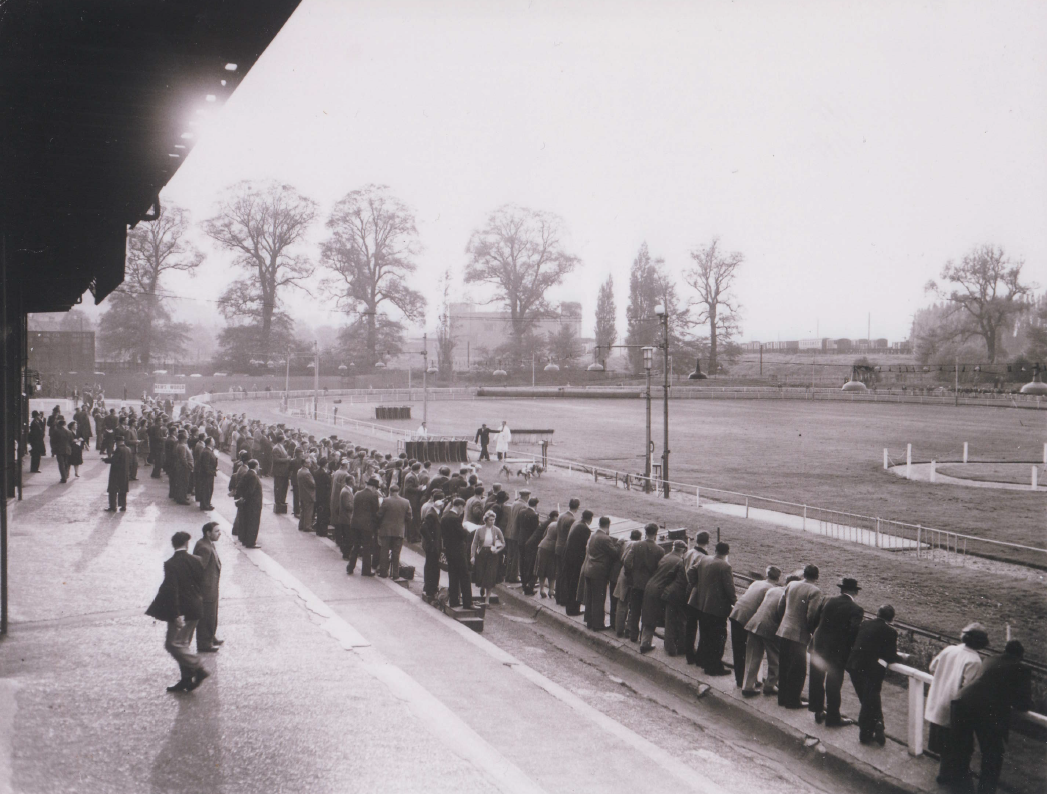
- Greyhound racing at Reading Stadium c.1950
- Location: Reading

Construction
- Opened: 1931
- Closed: 1974

Tenant
- Greyhound racing

Reading Stadium (Oxford Road) was a greyhound racing stadium and short lived speedway venue in Reading.

It is not to be confused with Reading Stadium in Bennet Road that opened one year after Oxford Road closed and is located further to the south of Reading.

== Opening ==
Reading Stadium was situated north-west of the town and was built adjacent to the Great Western Railway and north of Wigmore Lane off the Oxford Road. It opened on Saturday 14 November 1931.

The stadium attracted a crowd estimated to be between four and five thousand who came to watch a seven race card produced by Racing Manager Mr J Compton with the first race starting at 7.30pm. The first race was won by 'Symbol' but the feature events of the evening were the Berkshire Stakes heats and Tilehurst hurdles stakes heats.

The success of the first nights racing resulted in two more meetings on the Monday and Wednesday and track alterations took place in time for the finals of the events mentioned that were held the following Saturday. The reason for alterations was because the public required a better view of the greyhounds from the run up to the winning post. The rails were moved back five yards and the track was lowered slightly.

== History ==
Clapton Stadium Ltd acquired the track in 1934, with the Managing Director being Mr H Garland Wells, the Director of Racing was Major C E R Moss and the Racing Manager was Mr H Craven. The track was running under National Greyhound Racing Club rules and the trainers included G F Spencer & George McKay. McKay went on to train the track's first big race winner when Black Lion Favourite won the Trafalgar Cup. Race distances were 400, 525 & 600 yards, the 400 yard distance was unique because it was the only race of that length that could be held over just two bends due to the extremely large nature of the track. Some of the fastest track times set in Britain were at Reading on the 526 yard circumference circuit.

The main grandstand was next to the racing kennels on the home straight and was accessed from the car park on Wigmore Lane and Oxford Road. The Popular Grandstand on the north side was opposite the main stand next to the railway line. The resident kennels were in a rural setting in nearby Tilehurst.

The stadium appointed former Reading F.C. goalkeeper Percy Whittaker as a trainer, where he joined fellow trainers, Hammond, Wingfield, Kennedy, Askey and Mann.

John Snowball the trainer of the first ever Scottish Greyhound Derby winner was appointed Racing Manager in 1944 after spending some time in Egypt with the Egyptian Greyhound Racing Association.

Snowball left for sister track Clapton Stadium in 1946 as Assistant Racing Manager before reverting to being a trainer once more. Tom Smith a former Catford Stadium trainer was also transferred to Clapton by the company in 1948 after a short spell as a trainer at Reading. Further company changes saw Eric Godfrey installed as Racing Manager before he became Director of Racing and was replaced by John Collins. In 1960 both were replaced, Collins by Ron Fraser and Godfrey by H J Richardson.

In 1945, Bally Rambler won the Midland Puppy Derby (the first notable open race success for a Reading greyhound). The following year the fawn dog broke two track records; the 400 yards national record held by Guideless Joe (held since 1932) and the 550 yards record. The premier event at the track was the Hunt Cup and during 1963 Clapton Stadiums Ltd scrapped evening starting times in an attempt to scupper the bookmaker shops from being able to take advantage of off-course betting without paying the industry its due worth.

In 1954, Wayside Abbey who won the Golden Crest for trainer Joe Farrand and Jim Sherry younger brother of Jack Sherry the well-known Ramsgate Stadium trainer won the Oxford Two Year Old Produce Stakes with Corrigeen Prince in 1965.

== Closure ==
Clapton Stadiums Ltd sold up to the Greyhound Racing Association (GRA) in 1966 and worryingly the GRA at this time ran the Property Trust who were responsible for selling land to developers (three stadiums had already been closed by them). Racing continued on Thursday and Saturday evenings with the greyhounds supplied by resident trainers Jim Sherry, Ron Jeffrey and Jim Barker plus Yates, Jimmy Jowett & Paddy Pierce. However, in 1971 the resident kennels were sold and Reading turned to the contracted trainers system. It was the beginning of the end with the stadium being sold by the GRA for e-development as warehousing in 1973, despite protests.

The final meeting was held on 10 November 1973 and the stadium was closed down on 1 January 1974, the site today is the Stadium Business Park on Stadium Way.

== Track Records ==
Distance	Greyhound	Time	Date	Notes
400y	Guideless Joe	22.00	15 June 1932	National Record
400y	Bally Rambler	21.99	29 May 1946	
460y	Captain Pike	25.67	12 September 1964	
500y	Peace Message	27.99	4 June 1960	
500y	Shady Mermaiden	27.99	20 July 1963	
500y	Duck Snatcher	27.81	1969	
500y	Beaverwood Wind	27.69	14 June 1969	
525y	Bella	30.05	16 April 1934	
550y	Lilacs Luck	31.43	15 May 1946	
550y	Bally Rambler	31.22	26 June 1946	
600y	Micks Fancy	34.22	14 November 1931	
600y	S.M Hector	34.13	13 April 1939	
700y	Pigalle Prince	39.92	25 June 1964	
700y	Movealong Phil	39.90	23 March 1966	
775y	Broomhill Broil	45.26	19 September 1936	
908y	Magic Brooklyn	53.57	07 May 1959	
400yH	Mac's Double	22.82	10 May 1933	National Record
460yH	Highwood Samson	26.50	1960	
500yH	Mina Digger	28.68	1970	
525yH	Bucail Macanta	30.98	7 October 1933	
600yH	Mac's Double	35.13	17 May 1933	
