= Mick Wheble =

British racing manager and charity advocate (1949–2023)

Mick Wheble MBE
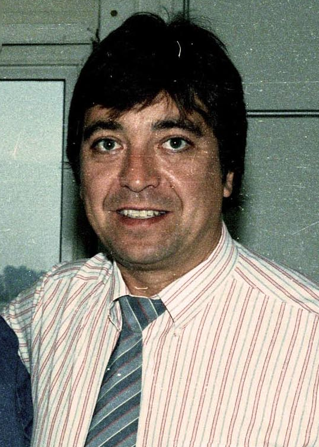
- Born: 3 April 1949; Bermondsey, London, England
- Died: 30 December 2023 (aged 74); Oxford, England

Michael John Wheble, MBE (3 April 1949 – 30 December 2023) was a British racing manager, marketing executive, author and charity advocate.

== Career ==
Wheble held the senior role, that of a Greyhound Board of Great Britain licensed Racing Manager at Leicester Stadium and Coventry Stadium before taking the position of Racing Manager at Oxford Stadium in the mid-eighties.

Wheble was instrumental in securing a first Bookmakers Afternoon Greyhound Service (BAGS) contract for Oxford and Ramsgate Stadium and then steered the company as the Group Racing Manager.

In 2005, he was awarded the Order of the British Empire (MBE) in the 2005 Birthday Honours for services to Greyhound Racing and to Charity.

Wheble wrote the children's stories 'The Adventures of Gordon the Greyhound' and the 'Further Adventures of Gordon the Greyhound' and was a keen advocate of the Retired Greyhound Trust and was a regular guest presenter on BBC Radio.

Wheble died from complications of oesophageal cancer in Oxford, on 30 December 2023.
