= 1970 UK & Ireland Greyhound Racing Year =

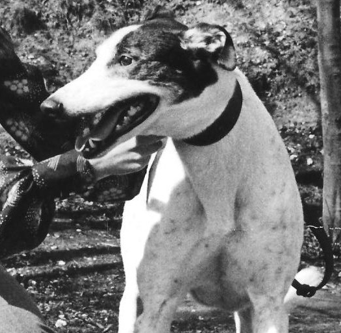
- Leading sire Newdown Heather

The 1970 UK & Ireland Greyhound Racing Year was the 45th year of greyhound racing in the United Kingdom and the 44th year of greyhound racing in Ireland.

== Roll of honour ==
Major Winners
Award	Name of Winner
1970 English Greyhound Derby	John Silver
1970 Irish Greyhound Derby	Monalee Pride
1970 Scottish Greyhound Derby	Brilane Clipper
1970 Welsh Greyhound Derby	Super Gamble
Greyhound Trainer of the Year	Stan Mitchell
Greyhound of the Year	Moordyke Spot
Irish Greyhound of the Year	Mark Anthony

== Summary ==
Tote turnover deductions were changed, with tracks being allowed to charge anything up to 12.5% in deductions. The annual National Greyhound Racing Club returns were released, with totalisator turnover at £55,556,351 and attendances recorded at 7,365,653 from 5585 meetings. 1970 English Greyhound Derby finalist Moordyke Spot won the Oxfordshire Stakes, Playfield Cup, and ran undefeated through the Pall Mall Stakes, contributing to another winning streak of eight including the White City Championship. He was retired to stud in Galway at the end of the year and was named Greyhound of the Year.

== Tracks ==
The Totalisator and Greyhound Holdings (T.G.H) were showing interest in buying stadia. They already held Crayford & Bexleyheath Stadium, Elland Road Greyhound Stadium, Brough Park and Gosforth Greyhound Stadium and then purchased the Midland Greyhound Racing Co Ltd owned tracks of Monmore Green Stadium and Willenhall Greyhound Stadium. Only the Greyhound Racing Association owned more tracks.

Hall Green Stadium underwent a major renovation when the club house was altered into a four tier restaurant costing £750,000. At the same time, the track kennels were replaced and the contract trainer system was brought in for the first time by the GRA, which would become a trend for most tracks in the near future. One of the contracted trainers was Geoff De Mulder, based from Meriden kennels. Another GRA track Powderhall modernised and new facilities included a 100 seated restaurant. There were changes too in the GRA trainer ranks with Peter Hawkesley moving to Harringay Stadium from West Ham Stadium to replace the retiring Wilf France. Hawkesley's head kennelhand Ted Parker was promoted to trainer at West Ham, who also appointed Colin West as another trainer. Self-service tote machines were also trialled by the company. Kings Heath Stadium was then purchased by the GRA Property Trust.

Perry Barr suffered major damage following a fire, the fire caused extensive damage but the main stand was rebuilt with a new restaurant and bar facilities and the track reopened soon after.

Hendon Greyhound Stadium which was enlarged to hold 5,000 persons before Hackney & Hendon Greyhounds Ltd was subject to a reverse takeover by businessman George Walker, brother of boxing champion Billy Walker. This meant his private company bought a public company and the new merger resulted in a new company called Brent Walker. Plans for the UK's first stand-alone shopping centre would result in the track's closure in 1972.

White City Stadium (Nottingham) closed after its owner Ernest Jolley, resulting in a sequence of events that led to the sale of the stadium to property developers.

== News ==
Harry 'Bammy' Bamford and Ron Saunders had their first graded runners at Belle Vue Stadium and White City Stadium (Manchester) respectively. The Rayleigh Weir Stadium Racing Manager Thomas Stanley was unwell and handed the reins to Roy Vickery, a former Crayford General Manager. Hare coursing became illegal in Northern Ireland and Southend held the first ever televised race meeting in colour.

Owner-trainer Ernie Gaskin Sr. advertised a litter for sale, after his bitch Come on Dolores whelped to Newdown Heather (Newdown Heather was considered the best sire for many years). Four brothers – Bert, Len, John and Arthur White – bought four of the litter including a bitch called Dolores Rocket. The black bitch won the Puppy Oaks and Juvenile in 1970, both at Wimbledon, and looked set for a big 1971. Dunstable GP Dr Dick Handley died, he was the founder of the Greyhound Breeders Forum. Leading greyhound owner Noel Purvis also died.

== Competitions ==
The Scottish Greyhound Derby returned at Shawfield Stadium, the new home of the event. The Steel City Cup was introduced at Owlerton Stadium. Wimbledon Stadium allowed private trainers to compete in a competition with Wimbledon runners; this gesture was welcomed by the private trainers association due to the fact that not many open races were advertised in the calendar for them. The Duke of Edinburgh Cup national inter-track competition grand final between White City and Brighton, ended with a win for White City.

Sherrys Prince won the Grand National at White City.

== Ireland ==
The Irish Greyhound Board purchased Harold's Cross Stadium after speculation that it would be demolished for re-development. Irish greyhound owners threatened strikes after the Board held trap draws several days before the meeting. Owners wished to keep draws to half an hour before as in Northern Ireland.

P.J.Carroll and Co, a cigarette company became the first sponsors of the Irish Greyhound Derby, won by Monalee Pride.

Leading stud dog Printer's Prince dies.

== Principal UK races ==
Grand National, White City (April 18 525y h, £500)
Pos	Name of Greyhound	Trainer	SP	Time	Trap
1st	Sherrys Prince	John Shevlin	4-6f	30.02	4
2nd	Rothe Boro	Jim Singleton	9-2	30.20	6
3rd	Beautys Wonder	Paddy McEvoy	8-1	30.21	3
4th	Adamstown Valley	Joe Pickering	8-1	30.29	1
5th	Petronius	Jack Harvey	25-1	30.32	2
6th	Active Hit	Nora Gleeson	9-1	30.38	5

BBC TV Trophy, White City Manchester (Apr 20, 880y, £1,000)
Pos	Name of Greyhound	Trainer	SP	Time	Trap
1st	Hi Diddle	Pam Heasman	10-1	51.95	6
2nd	Panda	Clare Orton	5-1	52.05	2
3rd	Sovereign Ore	John Perrin	11-8f	52.06	4
4th	Cash For Dan	Ben Parsons	9-2	52.16	1
5th	Marys Pal	Colin McNally	7-4	52.17	3
6th	Parkwest Lady	Phil Rees Sr.	12-1	52.33	5

Gold Collar, Catford (May 9, 570y, £1,500)
Pos	Name of Greyhound	Trainer	SP	Time	Trap
1st	Cameo Lawrence	Jack Smith	8-1	33.84	5
2nd	Pallas Joy	Adam Jackson	12-1	34.24	6
3rd	Al's Tiger	Tom Smith	14-1	34.76	4
4th	Barrack Street	Dave Barker	8-11f	35.20	2
5th	Moate Lane	Tom Smith	11-2	35.52	1
6th	Kilroe Betty	Paddy McEvoy	11-2	00.00	3

Oaks, Harringay (May 18, 525y, £1,000)
Pos	Name of Greyhound	Trainer	SP	Time	Trap
1st	Perth Pat	Jim Morgan	13-8f	28.81	3
2nd	Tibretta	Les Parry	7-4	29.25	5
3rd	The Marchioness	Reg Young	14-1	29.37	4
4th	Sister Kuda	George Curtis	8-1	29.39	1
5th	Farma Sally	Phil Rees Sr.	3-1	29.53	2
N/R	Blackoaks Lady	Natalie Savva			6

The Grand Prix, Walthamstow (May 26, 700y, £750)
Pos	Name of Greyhound	Trainer	SP	Time	Trap
1st	Baton	Jack Durkin	9-4	40.39	3
2nd	Meanus Donal	Wilf France	2-1f	40.63	1
3rd	Noble Harmony		16-1	40.79	4
4th	Velvet John	Arthur Hancock	3-1	40.87	6
5th	New Change	Dave Geggus	10-1	40.95	2
6th	Beaverwood Bee		16-1	41.03	5

Welsh Derby, Arms Park (Jul 4, 525y £500)
Pos	Name of Greyhound	Trainer	SP	Time	Trap
1st	Super Gamble	Paddy Coughlan	2-1jf	29.46	2
2nd	Ardkeen Joy		5-1	29.58	1
3rd	Waterloo Place	Andy Agnew	2-1jf	29.74	4
4th	Moss Tan	H.Pett	6-1	29.86	5
5th	Right O'Myross	Paddy Coughlan	7-1	30.02	3
6th	Legane Glory	Ronnie Mills	8-1	30.10	6

Scurry Gold Cup, Clapton (Jul 11, 400y £1,000)
Pos	Name of Greyhound	Trainer	SP	Time	Trap
1st	Don't Gambol	Paddy McEvoy	3-1	22.48	1
2nd	Ardnaculla Duke	John Coleman	5-4f	22.72	6
3rd	Gaultier Captain	Randy Singleton	13-2	23.00	3
4th	Little Glen		14-1	23.38	2
5th	Tibretta	Les Parry	9-2	23.52	4
6th	Tails Up		16-1	23.70	5

Laurels, Wimbledon (Aug 7, 500y, £2,000)
Pos	Name of Greyhound	Trainer	SP	Time	Trap
1st	Sole Aim	David Geggus	6-4f	28.04	1
2nd	Always A Monarch	Eddie Moore	10-1	28.05	5
3rd	The Other Green	Jim Irving	7-4	28.11	2
4th	Zebrano	Gunner Smith	10-3	28.13	6
5th	Clorinka Castle	Dave Geggus	33-1	28.23	4
6th	Corral Romeo	Nora Gleeson	10-1	28.33	3

St Leger, Wembley (Aug 24, 700y, £1,500)
Pos	Name of Greyhound	Trainer	SP	Time	Trap
1st	Spotted Rory	Paddy McEllistrim	2-1f	40.28	2
2nd	Moordyke Monalee	Noreen Collin	9-4	40.44	4
3rd	Swift Silver	Arthur Hancock	11-2	40.60	6
4th	Bushane Queen	Mrs.B.Martin	14-1	41.16	5
5th	Peace Blue Boy	Stan Mitchell	20-1	41.56	3
6th	Monalee Peter	Tom Johnston Jr.	9-4	DNF	1

Scottish Greyhound Derby, Shawfield (Aug 29, 525y, £1,000)
Pos	Name of Greyhound	Trainer	SP	Time	Trap
1st	Brilane Clipper	Joe Kelly	9-4f	29.06	6
2nd	Bright Lad		6-1	29.12	1
3rd	Afore You Go	Bessie Lewis	7-2	29.24	5
4th	Gleneagle Comedy	Jim Hookway	7-2	29.26	3
5th	Gormanstown Yank	Harry Ward	7-1	29.74	4
6th	Moordyke Darkie	Eddie Moore	10-1	29.86	2

Cesarewitch, West Ham (Oct 2, 600y, £1,500)
Pos	Name of Greyhound	Trainer	SP	Time	Trap
1st	Gleneagle Comedy	Jim Hookway	10-1	33.25	5
2nd	Brilane Clipper	Joe Kelly	6-4f	33.45	6
3rd	Rising Shane		7-1	33.53	1
4th	John Silver	Geoff De Mulder	9-4	33.61	4
5th	Alvys Pride	Harry Ward	5-1	33.67	3
6th	Quail's Glory	Ted Parker	6-1	33.85	2

== Totalisator returns ==
Extended content

The totalisator returns declared to the licensing authorities for the year 1970 are listed below.

Stadium	Turnover £
London (White City)	5,956,107
London (Harringay)	3,582,928
London (Walthamstow)	3,548,800
London (Wimbledon)	3,387,354
London (Wembley)	2,653,804
London (Catford)	2,382,295
Manchester (Belle Vue)	2,216,509
London (Clapton)	1,905,805
London (West Ham)	1,643,729
Romford	1,566,886
Edinburgh (Powderhall)	1,456,149
Manchester (White City)	1,368,935
London (Charlton)	1,236,216
Birmingham (Hall Green)	1,186,077
Brighton & Hove	1,156,613
Birmingham (Perry Barr, old)	1,049,165
Newcastle (Brough Park)	1,030,374
Crayford & Bexleyheath	971,739

Stadium	Turnover £
Glasgow (Shawfield)	939,471
Slough	900,620
Leeds (Elland Road)	867,796
Wolverhampton (Monmore)	799,686
Southend-on-Sea	753,620
Sheffield (Owlerton)	742,695
Glasgow (White City)	655,701
Bristol (Eastville)	651,986
London (Hackney)	647,320
Willenhall	622,020
Manchester (Salford)	618,529
Newcastle (Gosforth)	617,960
London (Hendon)	608,290
Gloucester & Cheltenham	590,615
Liverpool (White City)	540,426
Cardiff (Arms Park)	492,054
Derby	469,214
Birmingham (Kings Heath)	461,214

Stadium	Turnover £
Ramsgate (Dumpton Park)	443,161
Reading (Oxford Road)	439,599
Poole	437,938
Rochester & Chatham	436,003
Cradley Heath	396,066
Oxford	385,504
Portsmouth	315,081
Glasgow (Carntyne)	311,978
Leicester (Blackbird Rd)	298,807
Middlesbrough	298,445
Rayleigh (Essex)	280,445
Hull (Old Craven Park)	262,486
Preston	262,360
Swindon	199,692
Wakefield	196,670
Norwich (City)	181,398
Nottingham (White City)	131,687
