= Reading Stadium =

Racing venue in Berkshire, England 1975–2008

Coordinates: 51°25′42″N 0°58′57″W

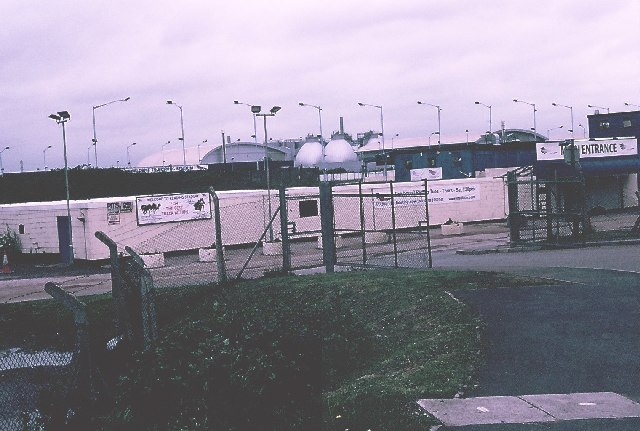
- Location: Bennet Road, Reading, Berkshire
- Operator: Allied Presentations 1975-2001; BS Group/Gaming International 2002-2008
- Opened: 1975
- Closed: 2008

Reading Stadium also known as Smallmead Stadium was an English greyhound racing and speedway stadium in Bennet Road, Reading in the county of Berkshire.

It is not to be confused with Reading Stadium on the Oxford Road that closed in 1974 and was located further to the north of Reading.

== Origins ==
In 1974 the Reading Stadium on the Oxford Road, north-west of the town was closed by the Greyhound Racing Association but the town of Reading soon had a replacement stadium when a company called Allied Presentations opened a new track accessed from the Bennet Road much further to the south of the town. The stadium was constructed on disused sludge beds and south of Island Road and north of Smallmead Road.

The stadium build was assisted by owner trainer Bill Dore who sat on the board of directors with Reg Fearman, F Higley and Len Silver. Martin Haigh would be Racing Manager.

== Greyhound racing ==
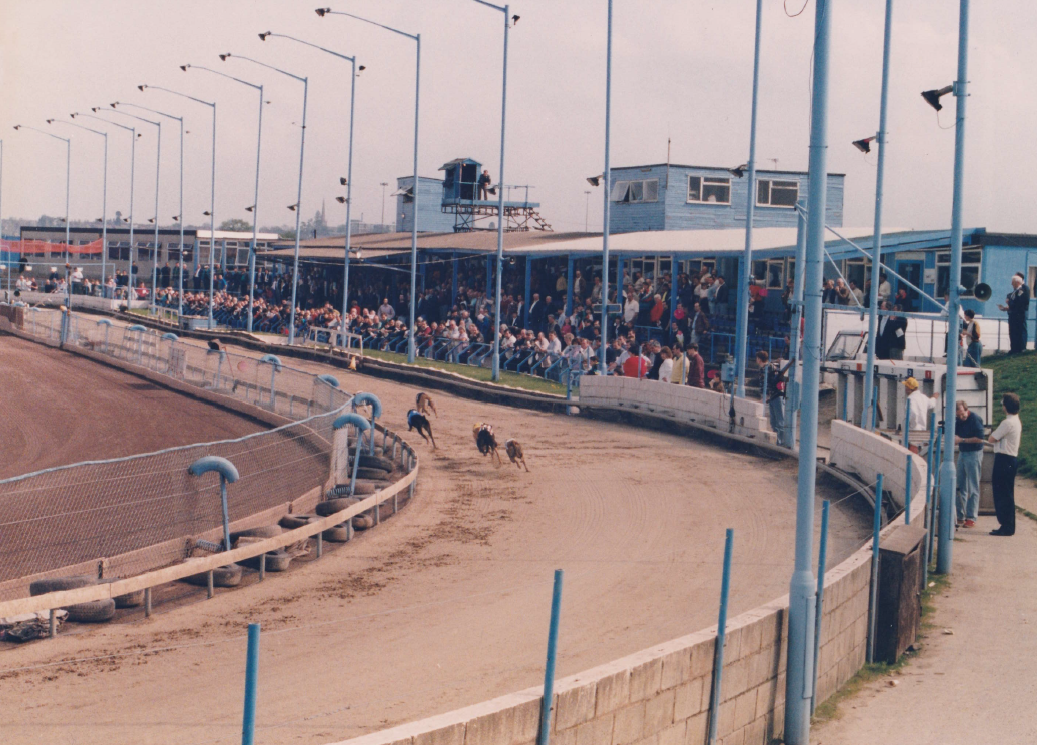
Greyhound track at Reading Stadium Smallmead c.1980

=== Opening ===
The first greyhound meeting was held on 10 June 1975. The first race was won by Mr T Coleman's Journeywork over 433 metres in a time of 27.84 secs. The circuit was all sand surface with an 'Outside Sumner' hare system. The circumference was 385 metres with usual race distances consisting of 275, 465 and 660 metres.

=== 1980s ===
The stadium introduced a significant competition called the Berkshire Cup and also resurrected the Hunt Cup. and attracted a good class of trainer including Terry Dartnall and Jerry Fisher, the latter won the Cesarewitch title with Jos Gamble in 1983. Fisher also trained Game Ball who he bought with owner Brian Smith for the sum of £8,000 at the end of 1982. Game Ball was put with Sean Bourke for the English Greyhound Derby and nearly fulfilled his promise being a losing favourite in the 1983 final. game Ball also won the Pall Mall Stakes before becoming a prominent sire.

Daleys Gold won the 1985 Scurry Gold Cup before Mollifrend Lucky trained by Colin Packham won the 1986 Scurry and Laurels in 1986. Martyn Dore (the son of Director and General Manager Bill Dore) was Racing Manager by 1988 as the track became renowned for having a strong class of runner.

=== 1990s ===
In 1990 the Maldwyn Thomas trained greyhounds with the prefix ‘Trans’ began to win trophies and 1992 proved to be a very successful year starting with the announcement that a competition called the Reading Masters would take place. The race offered substantial prize money with only the English Derby and Scottish Derby able to top the £15,000 winner's prize. Poor Brian won the Oxfordshire Stakes for Ron Jeffrey (a former trainer at the old Reading track) and Bob Gilling's Skelligs Smurf became Oaks champion with Bixby (Bill Black) becoming the Puppy Derby winner.

Champion trainer John 'Ginger' McGee joined the training ranks in 1993 and won the Greyhound Trainer of the Year twice as a Reading trainer in 1993 and 1994. The Keith Howard 'Hedsor' prefix was next to provide the track with more success Walthamstow Stadium greyhound Palace Issue claimed a third consecutive Hunt Cup in 2001. In 1998 John McGee returned for a second spell at the track and Paul Young also arrived as a trainer.

=== 2002-2008 ===
The track underwent a major change in 2002 when the BS Group/Gaming International bought the venue from Allied Presentations. Terry Dartnall returned to the track as a trainer once again and won two Select Stakes with Cleenas Lady before retiring and handing the licence to son Matt who then won the Juvenile in 2008 with Ballymac Under.

== Closure ==
In 2008 the local council refused to extend the tracks lease citing redevelopment plans. The plans for the company to build a new modern stadium came to nothing with the final meeting being held on 22 October 2008 and the stadium was demolished.

== Track records ==
=== At closing ===
Extended content

The track records at the time of closing were -

Metres	Greyhound	Time	Date	Notes
275	Greenfield Box	16.32	23 October 1982	
465	Blue Murlen	27.56	28 April 1997	
660	Double Take	40.50	14 December 2003	Hunt Cup Final
850	Greenacre Lin	53.26	16 September 2004	
1045	Slaneyside Demon	68.82	1 October 2006	
465 H	Druids Mickey Jo	28.40	22 September 2005	
660 H	Gold Splash	41.95	24 April 1993	

=== Previous ===
Extended content

Metres	Greyhound	Time	Date	Notes
465	Shiloh Jenny	28.77	September 1978	Berkshire Cup heats
465	Kilmagoura Mist	28.74	September 1978	Berkshire Cup heats
465	Saucy Buck	28.63	September 1978	Berkshire Cup heats
465	Fevata Spec	28.12	31 January 1987	
465	Fearless Mustang	28.10	9 April 1991	Trainer's Championship
465	Murlens Abbey	27.89	21 April 1992	
465	Coomlogane Euro	27.87	24 November 1994	
465	Frisco Sir	27.81	28 April 1997	
635	Ballybeg Story		1975	
635	Ballybeg Gem		Jan 1976	
660	Racewell Royale	41.02	17 November 1987	
660	Waltham Abbey	41.00	22 October 1988	
660	Airmount Flash	41.00	1 December 1992	
660	Hedsor Kurt	40.90	21 August 1997	
660	Lydpal Frankie	40.71	16 May 1999	
850	Jos Gamble	54.50	19 November 1983	
850	Cloverhill June	54.28	1989	
850	Ivory Lamb	54.19	11 September 1990	
850	Hedsor Erika	54.03	21 August 1997	
850	Lady Flyaway	53.56	3 May 1998	
1045	Home Yer Go	68.60	1 November 1986	
1045	Coverall	68.09	30 November 1990	
1045	Sandollar Sophie	67.90	30 April 1994	
1045	Souda Bay	67.58	3 May 1998	
465 H	The Dingle Man	28.93	8 January 1983	
465 H	Harbour Knight	28.92	8 April 1991	
465 H	Gis A Smile	28.58	30 April 1994	
465 H	Wisley Wonder	28.45	22 May 1997	
660 H	Trixies Snipe	42.51	19 November 1983	
660 H	Run On Tar	41.96	30 November 1990	
