= Geoff De Mulder =

English greyhound trainer

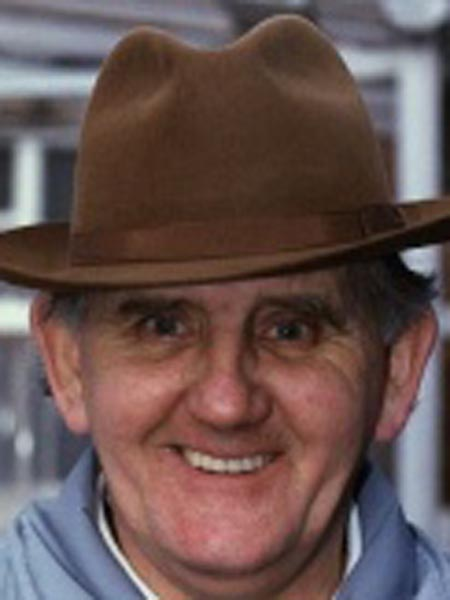

Personal information
- Born: Q2 1930 Doncaster, Yorkshire, England
- Died: 11 December 2009 aged 79 England
- Occupation: Greyhound Trainer

Sport
- Sport: Greyhound racing

Achievements and titles
- National finals: Derby wins: English Derby (1974, 1979); Scottish Derby (1978); Classic/Feature wins: Trainers Championship (1977, 1987); Pall Mall (1988); Puppy Derby (1985); Grand Prix (1976); Trafalgar Cup (1977, 1982, 1985, 1987, 1997); Select Stakes (1978, 1979, 1980, 1986); Juvenile (1982, 1986, 1998)

Geoffrey De Mulder (1930 – 11 December 2009) was an English greyhound trainer. He was a two times champion trainer of Great Britain and was regarded as the leading trainer during the 1970s and 1980s. De Mulder won the Greyhound Trainer of the Year twice in 1978 and 1979.

== Early life ==
He was born in Yorkshire and grew up in a greyhound racing environment because his father Joe De Mulder was a prominent trainer during the 1950s and 1960s.

== Career ==
After learning his trade with his father he took over the National Greyhound Racing Club licence in 1967 and he made the Gold Collar final in his rookie year. His father retained ownership of several greyhounds in the kennel. The majority of his kennel were open race class greyhounds but he held attachments throughout the Midlands at Oxford Stadium, Nottingham Stadium, Coventry Stadium, Hall Green Stadium and Norton Canes Stadium.

His first major result was getting Little County into the 1970 English Greyhound Derby final where he finished runner-up. Training out of kennels in Meriden in the West Midlands, he gained the nickname 'The Wizard of Meriden' and consistently won major competitions during the 1970s and 1980s.

His biggest successes were the two English Greyhound Derby wins in 1974 with Jimsun and 1979 with Sarahs Bunny, a Scottish Greyhound Derby and four times winner of the Consolation Derby. He sent out 14 English Derby finalists.

De Mulder won the Trainers Championship twice in 1977 and 1987.

De Mulder was responsible for the greyhounds with the 'Fearless' prefix' and was well known for being eccentric. His protégé Tony Meek went on to win two English Greyhound Derby finals. After a long illness he died in 2009 leaving a wife and two children.
