= Cock o' the North (greyhounds) =

English greyhound racing competition

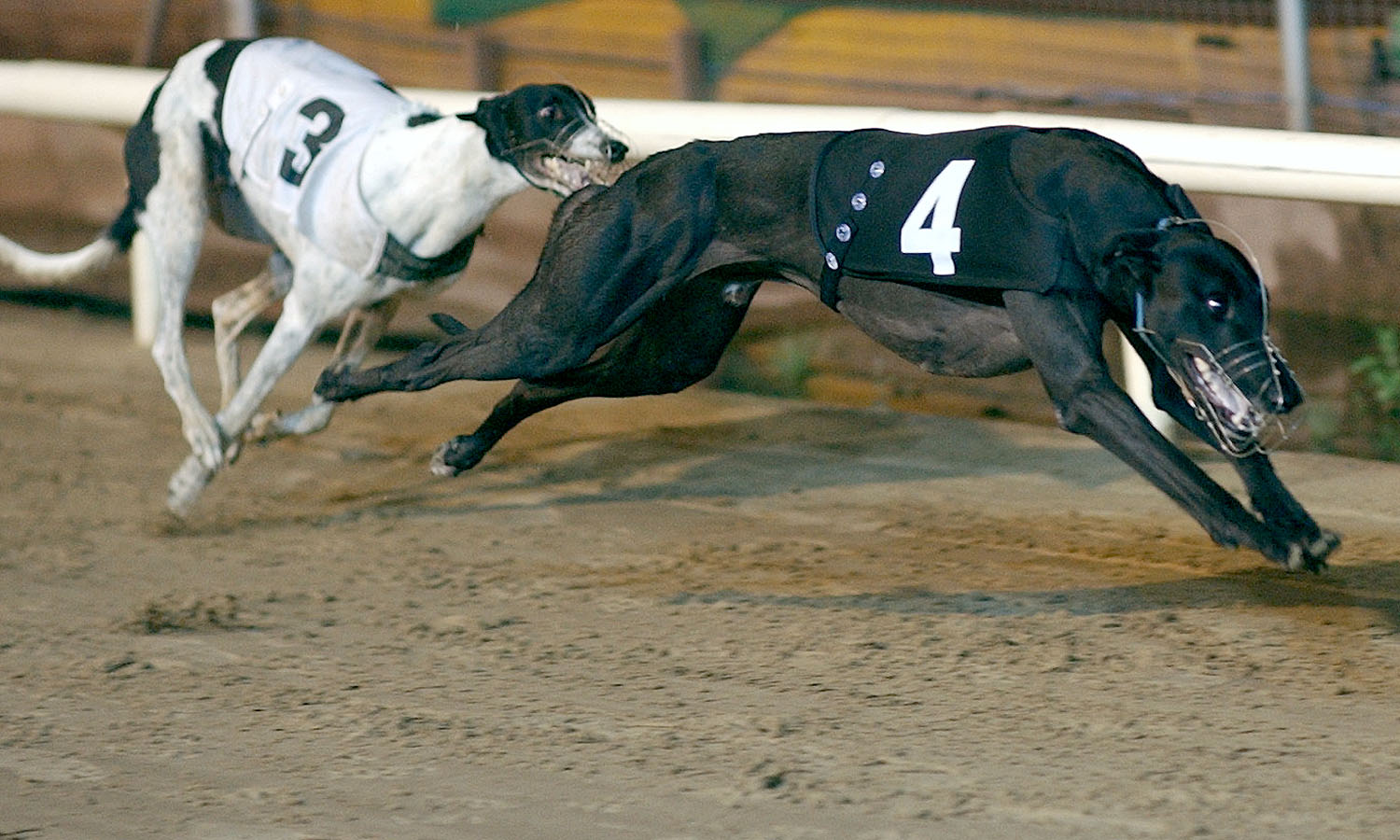
- Black Pear (trap 4) was the 2004 champion
- Location: White City Stadium (Manchester); Belle Vue Stadium
- Inaugurated: 1960
- Final run: 2012
- Sponsor: Wafcol; C & T Bookmakers

Race information
- Distance: 670 metres
- Surface: Sand

The Cock o' the North was a greyhound racing competition held annually at the White City Stadium Manchester and later Belle Vue Stadium in Manchester.

It was inaugurated in 1960 at the White City Stadium and was held annually until the track closed in 1981. The race switched to fellow Manchester track Belle Vue in 1982 but was discontinued after 2012.

== Venue ==
- 1960-1981 (White City, Manchester)
- 1982-2005 (Belle Vue, 647m)
- 2006-2012 (Belle Vue, 670m)

== Sponsors ==
- 1998-2009 Wafcol
- 2010-2012 C&T Bookmakers

== Past winners ==
Year	Winner	Breeding	Trainer	Time	SP	Notes
1960	Anglesboro Playmate	Ballymac Ball – Anglesboro Princess	Ron Chamberlain (Private)	41.03	7-2	
1961	Desert Rambler	Champion Prince – Imperial Peg	Joe Booth (Private)	40.60		
1962	Strelka	War Dance – Imperial Astra	Jim Irving (Private)	41.80		
1963	Mighty Kern	Kilcaskin Kern – Golden Plover	L.Hague – (White City, Man)	41.90		
1964	Boothroyden Larry	Crazy Parachute – Kockmullagh Lady	Harry Bamford (Private)	50.40		
1965	Greenane Flash	Prairie Flash - Greenane Item	Jimmy Quinn (Perry Barr)	42.46		
1966	Guest House II	Chieftains Guest – Ballygoughlan Fire	W.Holland (Belle Vue)	41.80		
1967	Country Duchess	Crazy Parachute – The Grand Duchess	Ted Brennan (Owlerton)	42.83		
1968	Forward King	Crazy Parachute – Supreme Witch	Ted Brennan (Owlerton)	42.12		
1969	Shady Begonia	Pigalle Wonder - Castle Swan	Gordon Hodson (White City, Lon)	41.58	7-4	
1970	Seafield Flash	Crazy Parachute – Seafield Min	Stan Mitchell (Belle Vue)	41.74	11-8f	
1971	Brookside Prince	Tell Nobody – Brookside Louise	Frank Melville (Harringay)	41.42	5-2	
1972	Waggy Champion	Maryville Hi – No Tea	Colin McNally (Perry Barr)	42.03	7-1	
1973	Thomond Girl	Yanka Boy - Kitty True	Eddie Moore (White City, Man)	41.89	2-1	
1974	Chickery Tip	Supreme Fun – Jula Flash	Godfrey (Private)	42.33	8-11f	
1975	Wow	Sole Aim – Ardnalee Gallant	Ron Saunders (White City, Man)	41.91	6-4f	
1976	Dear Charmer	Butchers Tec – Newhouse Blue	Ken Reynolds (Private)	42.50	4-5f	
1977	Ballybeg Grand	The Grand Silver – Ballybeg Lady	Tom Chamberlain (Private)	41.27	4-6f	
1978	Sheskburn Mint	Westpark Mint – Pride of Dundee	Joe Booth (Private)	41.55	8-11f	
1979	Remarkable Lad	Tain Mor – Alice Silver	Harry Bamford (Belle Vue)	41.99	5-1	
1980	Honeygar Kid	Itsachampion – Moorstown Fog	Ray Andrews (Leeds)	41.36	6-4f	
1981	Honeygar Kid	Itsachampion – Moorstown Fog	Ray Andrews (Leeds)	41.70	5-1	
1982	Decoy Dorothy	Westown Adam – Ka Boom	Joe Cobbold (Cambridge)	39.63	1-2f	
1983	Bally Star	Ballydonnell Sam – Got the Turn	Linda Mullins (Cambridge)	38.99	5-4f	
1984	Sollom Joker	Prince Champion – Lasting Fame	Morgan (Private)	40.75	5-2	
1985	Moorside Girl	Brainy Prince – Caves Girl	Trevor Draper (Sheffield)	40.34	5-2	
1986	Special Sally	Gambling Fever – Moorstown Peg	Carol Evans (Belle Vue)	40.37	9-2	
1987	Slaneyside Point	San Man – Prince of Rocks	Melvin Baker (Norton Canes)	40.81	4-5f	
1988	Hot News	Hatton News – Hot Primrose	Pete Beaumont (Sheffield)	40.95	4-1	
1989	Catunda Flame	Easy and Slow – Catunda Slave	Russ Kinsey (Norton Canes)	40.77	2-5f	
1990	Viking Champ	Fearless Champ – Bretton Lassie	Paul Owens (Swindon)	40.44	9-2	
1991	Blind Joe	Come on Ranger – Hazelbrook Haven	Jimmy Gibson (Belle Vue)	40.69	8-1	
1992	Wait Slippy	Im Slippy – Cleonas Style	Jimmy Gibson (Belle Vue)	40.75	10-1	
1993	Monard Wish	Whisper Wishes – Solas An Maidin	Charlie Lister (Peterborough)	40.01	11-10f	
1994	Saints Charlie	Aussie Flyer – Saints Tania	Mrs Pat Branagh (Belle Vue)	40.76	14-1	
1995	Justright Melody	Farloe Melody – Farloe Mineola	Tom Robinson (Private)	40.38	3-1	
1996	Thornfield Dino	Fearless Mustang – Thonrfield Sophi	Ron Coulton (Private)	40.32	4-1	
1997	Winetavern Tiger	Double Bid – Nice One Zoe	James Costello (Perry Barr)	40.61	9-4f	
1998	Millstream Lad	Come On Ranger – Wise Up Jim	Andrew O'Flaherty (Stainforth)	40.24	4-11f	
1999	Blind Joe	Come On Ranger – Hazelbrook Haven	Jimmy Gibson (Belle Vue)	40.69	8-1	
2000	Ruby Willows	Some Gamble – Gypsy Lass	Paul Stringer (Private)	39.57	9-2	
2001	Blackrock Issue	Slaneyside Hare – Pennys Issue	John Walton (Belle Vue)	40.40	2-1	
2002	Illinois Icon	Toms The Best – Super Rhythm	John Mullins (Walthamstow)	40.13	7-4f	
2003	Ali Qapu Oak	Roanokee – Mustang Starsky	Richard Ward (Milton Keynes)	39.68	8-1	
2004	Black Pear	Kilmessan Jet – Time For Chips	Wayne Wrighting (Hove)	39.50	11-8	
2005	Droopys Sporty	Droopys Kewell – Droopys Gaf	Barrie Draper (Sheffield)	39.42	8-1	
2006	Roxholme Boy	Droopys Woods – Tree Climber	Carly Philpott (Private)	40.77	1-1f	
2007	Charlies Dream	Jamella Prince – Micks Top Lass	Otto Kueres (Belle Vue)	40.60	12-1	
2008	Ballymac Weeshie	True Honcho - Ballymac Floss	Sam Poots (Private)	40.34	1-1f	
2009	Hurleys Hero	Daves Mentor – Sound Lassie	Jimmy Wright (Newcastle)	40.18	1-2f	Track record
2010	England Expects	Westmead Hawk – Move Over Marie	Jimmy Wright (Newcastle)	40.99	7-4	
2011	Droopys Arshavin	Droopys Maldini – Droopys Seville	Stuart Mason (Private)	40.97	100-30	
2012	Ballyard Buddy	Westmead Hawk – Oranmore Beauty	Stuart Mason (Private)	40.68	9-4	
