= Belle Vue Stadium =

Greyhound racing track in Manchester, England

Coordinates: 53°27′40″N 2°11′3″W

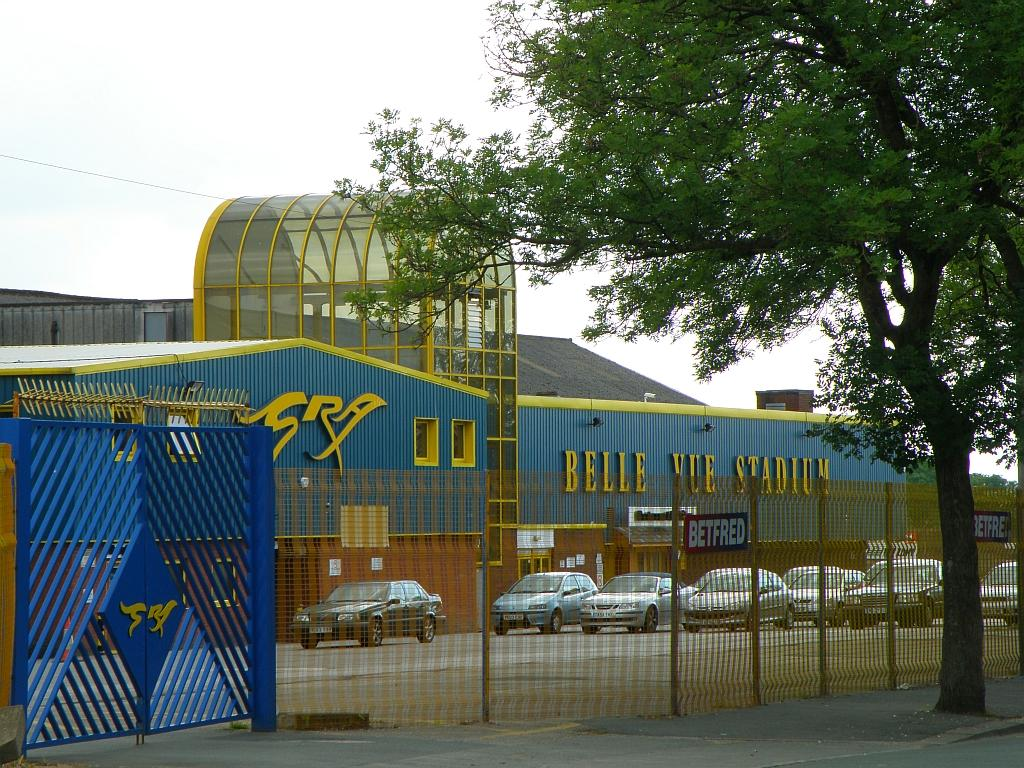
- The stadium in 2009
- Interactive map of Belle Vue Stadium
- Location: Belle Vue, Manchester, England
- Owned by: GRA (1926–2014); Crown Oil Pension Fund (2014–)
- Operated by: GRA (1926–2019); ARC (2019–2020)
- Date opened: 24 July 1926
- Date closed: 1 August 2020

Belle Vue Stadium was a greyhound racing track in Belle Vue, Manchester, England, where the first race around an oval track in Britain was held on 24 July 1926. It has also been used for motorcycle speedway, as the home ground of the team Belle Vue Aces in 1928 and from 1988 until 2015, and from 1999 until 2019 for stock car racing and banger racing.

The track was owned (1926–2014) and operated (1926–2019) by the Greyhound Racing Association. The Crown Oil Pension Fund bought the stadium in 2014. The stadium had luxury glass-fronted grandstands, restaurants, hospitality boxes and bars. Greyhound racing took place during three evenings including Saturday and some afternoons on the Bookmakers Afternoon Greyhound Service (BAGS).

== Speedway ==
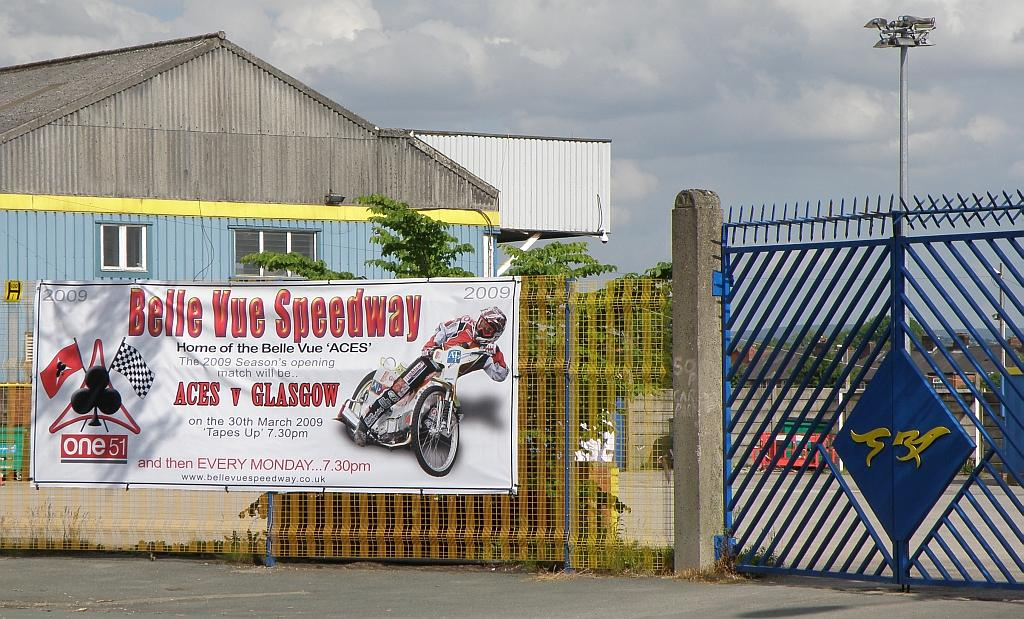
Belle Vue Stadium in Manchester, 2009

Speedway was first held at the stadium during 1928 but was not held again until 1 April 1988, when the Belle Vue Aces returned to the stadium. The team departed Kirkmanshulme Lane at the end of the 2015 season, prior to moving to the new National Speedway Stadium for the 2016 campaign. The shale speedway track was 285 metres (312 yards) in length.

== Greyhound racing ==
=== Origins ===
In 1925, Charles A. Munn, an American businessman, made a deal with Smith and Sawyer for the rights to promote greyhound racing in Britain. Although the earlier attempt to introduce mechanical racing at Hendon had almost been forgotten, the pastime of coursing was still strong in Britain. The first person Munn contacted was Major L. Lyne Dixson. The Major was a leading figure in British field sports and was quickly won over to the idea presented to him by the American entrepreneur.

Finding other supporters proved to rather difficult however. With the General Strike of 1926 looming, the two men scoured the country in an attempt to find others who would join them. Eventually they met Brigadier-General Alfred Critchley, who in turn introduced them to Sir William Gentle JP. Between them they raised £22,000 and formed the Greyhound Racing Association Ltd. When deciding where to situate their new stadium, Manchester was considered to be the ideal place because of its sporting and gambling links. Close to the city centre, the consortium erected the first custom-built greyhound stadium and called it Belle Vue. The name of the stadium came from the nearby Belle Vue Zoological Gardens that had been built in 1836 and the land on which the stadium was to stand had been an area of farmland known as Higher Catsknowl and Lower Catsknowl.

=== Opening ===
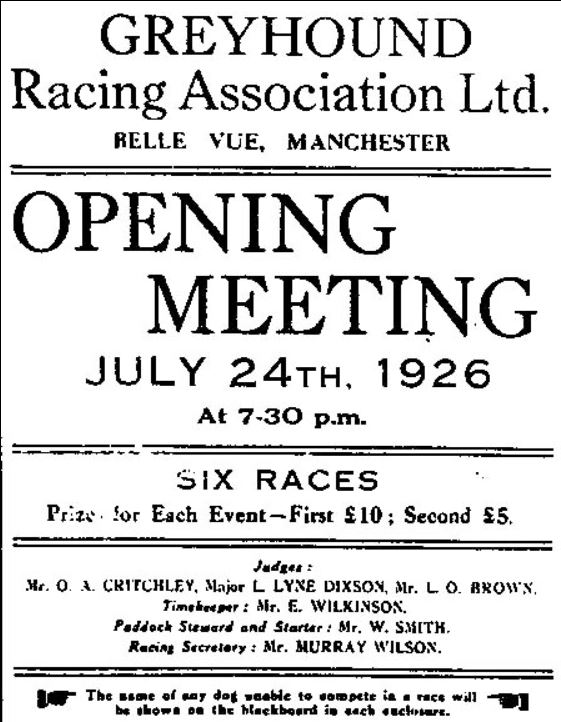
The first meeting

The very first race around an oval track in Britain was held on 24 July 1926. More than 1,700 people were attracted to the meeting where they watched a greyhound called Mistley win over 440 yards (402 m).

Six races with seven dogs in each race were held in the first meeting. Fifty years later a stand was named after Mistley, the winner of the first race at 6-1 from trap one. Running the quarter-mile flat course in 25 seconds, Mistley romped home eight lengths clear at 6–1.

The first Director of racing was Major-General T Anderson and the first Racing Manager was L.V.Browne. The first trainers included Tom Fear, Bill Brinkley, Jack Harvey, Jack Buck and H Wilson. After the end of that first meeting, the GRA were horrified to find they had made a loss of £50 but as it turned out they clearly had made a good decision because 16,000 turned up the following week. The first three-month racing season saw more than 11,000 racegoers, 37 meetings and 221 races The consortium repaid a £10,000 bank loan and shares in the new company rose from their initial value of one shilling to £37–10–00 (the equivalent of £37.50 for an outlay of 5p).

Going to the dogs became a national pastime and the GRA became a substantial company.

=== Pre-War ===
By June 1927, the stadium was attracting almost 70,000 visitors a week. Belle Vue increased the number of runners per race to seven, but after the formation of the National Greyhound Racing Club (NGRC) in 1928 the maximum number of dogs per race was limited to six. The phenomenal success resulted in an almost instant and dramatic mass build of greyhound stadiums. One early supplier of greyhounds to Belle Vue was Sidney Orton, a Norfolk farmer who sold 17 greyhounds to Belle Vue for £170 in 1927. Orton would eventually turn his attention to training them at Burhill kennels for Wimbledon Stadium. In 1927, Bonzo, handled by Belle Vue trainer Jack Buck, was the first winner of the Grand National, known as the Champion Hurdle at the time. In 1930, Belle Vue had an English Greyhound Derby finalist when Dresden trained by Eddie Wright finished fourth to none other than Mick the Miller.

Belle Vue introduced the Northern Flat as their first major event in 1927. In 1930, as the sport continued as the nation's leading pastime, the GRA acquired the nearby White City track in the Old Trafford area from Canine Sports Ltd. The first major Belle Vue hound was Wild Woolley; the brindle dog had won the Derby with Jack Rimmer in 1932 but switched kennels to join Jimmy Campbell. Belle Vue had 320 heated kennels housing both track's greyhounds and Wild Woolley won the Northern Flat in a world record time and the Laurels the following year before returning to Rimmer.

In 1936, Banksell won the Edinburgh Cup for John Dickenson and Genial Radiance claimed the Oaks for A.G.Hiscock. The Northern 700 was set up as a new race in 1937 joining the Northern Flat as prominent events. It was in 1937 that GRA purchased the land on which the stadium sat bringing the whole operation into their hands. Crowds continued to flock to the race meetings even as war broke out and racing was restricted to daytimes or summer. Billy Butlin sat on the board of directors in 1947.

=== 1950s ===
In 1957, Cyril Beamount's Ballypatrick took the Scottish Greyhound Derby title and during June 1964 Belle Vue won the Greyhound Derby for the first time, Hack Up Chieftain trained by Percy Stagg and owned by S.Donohue had won a minor open at Belle Vue when watched by Brigadier General Critchley a GRA Director. Critchley suggested that the greyhound be offered the 48th and last place in that year's event. Mr W S Mulley became Racing Manager in the early fifties and would eventually be replaced by Arthur Aldridge in 1959 who in turn left to be replaced by Norman Russell in the early sixties. The track was chosen by the NGRC to host the BBC Television Trophy four times from 1961 to 1982. Randy Singleton gained a trainer position taking over from Ralph Hencher in 1959.

=== 1960s ===
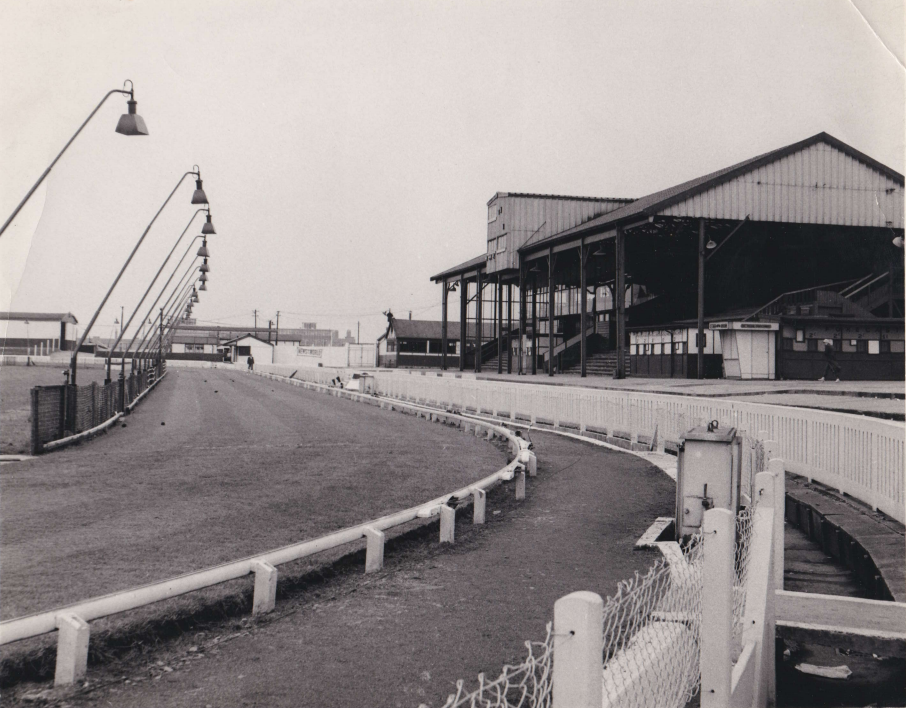
Belle Vue Stadium during the 1960s

In 1961, the GRA introduced under track heating systems at Belle Vue, Harringay and White City following a successful trial in Scotland. Electric cables were basically sewn into the track by the tractor and a team of workers about eight inches under the turf. They would prove to be useful until the advent of all sand tracks. In 1971 Hall Green Racing Manager Sid Wood moved to Belle Vue and Bob Rowe (son of Leicester Racing Manager John Rowe) filled the position at Hall Green. This was the same year that the GRA experimented with eight dog racing. In fact the Northern Flat took place as an eight dog competition, the first major event to do so.

=== 1970s ===
The 1970s started well when Stan Mitchell was named Greyhound Trainer of the Year. Following the closure of West Ham in 1972, the classic race known as the Cesarewitch was transferred to sister track Belle Vue and GRA Director of Racing Major Percy Brown retired after 40 years in the sport. It was in the seventies that Belle Vue underwent a £500,000 facelift, the previously mentioned Mistley stand was built and the track was able to offer a state of the art restaurant and tote facilities. The popular side stand was also renamed the Chieftain stand after their Derby champion.

During the Silver Jubilee year of 1977 Balliniska Band trained by Eddie Moore claimed a second Greyhound Derby crown for Belle Vue and owner Raphael Bacci. Norman Porter was the Racing Manager at Belle Vue in 1983 when the White City track in Manchester closed its doors. Consequently, the Cock O’the North race was switched to Belle Vue but the Manchester Cup, a former Belle Vue event was scrapped.

=== 1980s ===
Ian Travis became Racing Manager in 1987 and the Cesarewitch was moved to sister track Catford Stadium.

=== 1990s ===
In 1995 but the Laurels arrived from Wimbledon in 1997.

=== 2000-present ===
In 2004, the Gold Collar was hosted by the track following the closure of Catford and a few years later the original classic race the Scurry Gold Cup was brought to the track in an attempt to save the classic race. The Gold Collar and Gorton Cup were discontinued. In 2018, the Oaks was given to Towcester following the decision by GRA to reduce their major race schedule. During the same year the stadium signed a deal with ARC to race every Wednesday afternoon and Sunday morning.

== Sale and closure ==
In 2014, the National Asset Management Agency (who was the parent company of the GRA at the time) sold Belle Vue Stadium for £2.6 million to Crown Oil Pension Fund, but agreed a leaseback to the GRA Acquisition until 2028 at a rent of £249,000 per year. Mutual break options were included in the 15 year tenancy agreement. A similar lease back agreement was agreed in the sale of the Hall Green Stadium with a break clause after five years which was exercised and Hall Green closed in July 2017.

In October 2019 GRA Acquisition sold the lease to the Arena Racing Company and just two months later on 19 December housing planning permission was passed resulting in a probable closure in 2020. The imminent closure came following an announcement on 1 August 2020, with the last race being run on 6 June, won by Rockmount Buster (trained by Gary Griffiths). The closure was accelerated by the COVID-19 pandemic because the stadium initially closed because of the virus and then the planned reopening only lasted one race meeting. Demolition work began in May 2021.

== Competitions ==
=== Gorton Cup ===
Year	Winner	Breeding	Trainer	Time	SP
1991	Mr Bawn	Special Merchant – Bawnard Mona	Mick Cowley (Private)	28.19	4-1
1992	Pond Tornado	I'm Slippy – Pond Mosquito	Harry Williams (Sunderland)	28.00	7-4f
1993	Watch The Bunny	I'm Slippy – Mixed Up Lady	Frank Watson (Belle Vue)	28.06	4-1
1994	Just Right Kylie	Kyle Jack – Im A Duchess	Charlie Lister (Private)	28.30	2-1
1995	White Ink	Alpine Minister – California Blue	Jimmy Gibson (Belle Vue)	28.31	2-1f
1996	Burnpark Lord	Airmount Grand – Burnpark Lisa	Dave Hopper (Sheffield)	27.78	7-4f
1997	Aztec Travel	Adraville Bridge – Lisnac Flyer	Nick Savva - Walthamstow	28.36	3-1
1998	Spoonbill Snowey	Right Wish – Clohast Wish	Michael Bacon (Perry Barr)	28.59	11-8f
1999	Thornfield Flash	Highmoor Glen – Thornfield Sophi	Ron Coulton (Private)	28.23	5-4f
2000	Farloe Cobbler	Cry Dalcash – Farloe Post	Barrie Draper (Sheffield)	28.02	1-1f
2001	Forans Field	Staplers Jo – Much Better	Barrie Draper (Sheffield)	27.81	9-2
2002	Pack Them In	Spiral Nikita – Supa Score	Andy Heyes (Belle Vue)	29.05	5-6f
2003	Lockup Firedice	Cushie Draco – Cushie Flair	John Mullins (Walthamstow)	27.87	8-1
2004	Holdyoursilence	Top Honcho – Misshenrietabell	Liz McNair (Private)	27.72	10-1
2005	Joes Gem	Larkhill Jo – Droopys Nancy	Otto Kueres (Belle Vue)	27.71	7-1
2006*	Ballymac Rooster	Roanokee – Ballymac Pepes	Carly Philpott (Private)	27.69	7-4
2007	Manic Mile	Pacific Mile – Cute Mandie	Graham Hutt (Private)	27.91	6-4f
2008	Blenhiem Dubh	Droopys Vieri – Blenhiem Queen	Julie Bateson (Private)	27.95	7-4f
2009	Royal Warrior	Spiral Nikita – Axle Grease	Stuart Mason (Private)	27.82	6-4f

=== Northern Stayers Stakes ===
Formerly the Northern 700

Year	Winner	Breeding	Trainer	Time (sec)	SP
1937	Sleeping Horner		Jimmy Campbell (Harringay)	41.01	5/4f
1946	Torard Rose		Ralph Hencher (Belle Vue)	41.36	4/1
1947	Jersey Creamery	Roeside Creamery – Jersey Lily	Percy Stagg (White City, Man)	41.58	9/4
1948	Kilbelin Dancer	Bellas Prince – Kilgowan	Percy Stagg –(White City, Man)	40.93	4/7f
1949	Rio Cepretta	Flying Dart – Rio Czarina	Stanley Biss (Clapton)	40.99	8/1
1950	Caledonian Faith	Train – Caledonian Desire	A Mountfield (Private)	40.96	6/1
1951	Brooklands Express		K Fraser (Belle Vue)	41.22	11/2
1952	Malanna Mace		Henry Parsons (Crayford)	40.88	1/2f
1953	Mottram Hero	Kilrid Hero – Samsons Spider	Ralph Hencher (Belle Vue)	40.94	7/4f
1955	Registered Cash	Bahs Choice – Any Cash	Percy Stagg (White City, Man)	40.90	7/2
1956	Duke Of Alva	Ballymac Ball - Marchioness Minnie	Ted Brennan (Owlerton)	41.22	1/2f
1957	Baytown Drone	Ollys Pal – Baytown Button	Harry Bidwell (Owlerton)	40.93	6/1
1958	Lancewood Olly	Ollys Pal – Maggies Choice II	Ted Brennan (Owlerton)	41.88	6/1
1959	Come To Johnny	The Grand Champion – Shaggy Lake	Jack Brennan (Darnall)	40.12	6/1
1960	Finisk River	The Grand Champion – Kilahalla Peggy	Cyril Beumont (Belle Vue)	41.80	2/1
1961	Master Mac Murragh	Solar Prince – Cailin Orgha	Cyril Beumont (Belle Vue)	41.06	
1962	Devilment	Solar Prince – All Steel	Ron Chamberlain (Private)	40.53	
1963	Buckwheat	Crazy Parachute – Tornado Lass	Paddy Keane (Private)	41.28	
1964	Joystick	Crazy Parachute – Snowfire Lady	Harry Bamford (White City, Man)	40.59	8/1
1965	Grove Rambler	Hi There – Grove Cheerful	Harry Bamford (Private)	41.97	
1966	Coloured Bill	Buffalo Bill – Fast Sister	Jim Hookway (Owlerton)	40.54	
1967	Outcast Mad	Crazy Parachute – Stokesfield Lass	Jim Irving (Private)	40.86	
1968	Booked Six	Booked Out - Technician	Wilf France (Belle Vue)	41.38	
1969	Aughgar King	Monalee King – White May	John Horsfall (Catford)	40.43	10-1
1970	Meronome	Prince of Roses – Meteoric	Harry Bamford (White City, Man)	40.18	7/1
1971	Knock Off	Aristos – Last Pot	Harry Bamford (Belle Vue)	39.29	
1972	Albany Ranger	Shanes Legacy – Little Justice	Eddie Moore (White City, Man)	40.16	5/1
1973	Poor Rudolf	Movealong Santa – Light Madam	Harry Bamford (Belle Vue)	39.80	7/2
1974	Boreen Spec		Tom Chamberlain (Private)	40.25	
1975	Moy Mona	Monlaee Gambler - Mronome	Harry Bamford (White City, Man)	39.72	
1976	Wow	Sole Aim – Ardnalee Gallant	Ron Saunders (White City, Man)	39.30	5-2
1977	Montreen	Moordyke Spot - Avondale	Harry Bamford (Belle Vue)	39.25	4/6f
1978	Jims Image	Jimsun – Wall Tie	Andy Agnew (Perry Barr)	39.96	
1979	Kilbelin Ruler	Supreme Fun - Duritza	George Barnett (White City, Man)	40.85	
1980	Honeygar Kid	Itsachampion – Moorstown Fog	Ray Andrews (Leeds)	40.23	
1982	Catsrock Tiger	Hunday Champion – Lighter Side	A Smith (Private)	39.54	5/1
1983	Sugar Palm	Brave Bran – Bridgeview Star	Marion Spencer (Leicester)	40.47	
1984	Feeling Great	Suir Miller – Single Luck	(Owlerton)	41.36	
1990	Fair And Square	Game Ball – Veazie Ann	Dave Hicken (Private)	40.60	8/1

1937–74 (700 yards), 1975–90 (647 metres)

== Track records ==
=== Final ===
Distance metres	Greyhound	Time	Date	Notes
260	Trapstyle Jet	14.78	14 October 2017	
470	Barnfield On Air	27.20	4 October 2007	
470	Ballymac Ambrose	27.20	31 August 2019	
590	Blakefield Jack	35.03	19 September 2015	
670	Wordsandatune	40.15	20 August 2009	
878	Capoley Ash	54.28	8 November 2011	
470 H	Platinumlancelot	27.85	9 June 2009	

=== Previous ===
Post-metric

Metres	Greyhound	Time	Date	Notes
237	Kilree Parade	14.69	14 July 1984	
237	Parliament Act	14.25	8 March 2001	
237	Laser Beam	14.18	13 February 2005	
237	Laser Beam	14.05	10 May 2005	
237	Little Flash	14.02	31 July 2005	
250	Night Runner	14.37	9 May 1987	
250	Guleen Wishes	14.35	1988	
250	Ravage Again	14.20	18 May 1990	
260	Quick Bozz	15.23	8 November 2005	
260	Hackman	15.23	28 May 2006	
260	Jetharts Here	15.21	20 September 2007	
260	Lunar Vacation	15.12	1 November 2007	
260	Boherbradda Mac	15.07	31 January 2008	
260	Abbeyside Bart	15.06	23 October 2008	
260	Pennylane Flash	15.05	28 May 2009	Scurry Gold Cup Heats
260	Centaur Allstar	15.00	4 June 2009	Scurry Gold Cup Semi-finals
260	Drumcove Lad	14.96	20 October 2011	Scurry Gold Cup Final
260 hurdles	Blonde Chief	15.76	26 February 2006	
460	Balliniska Band	27.26	9 April 1977	
460	Kickham Inn	27.26	15 May 1978	
460	Hillville Flyer	27.15	May 1982	
460	Fearless Mover	27.04	May 1982	
460	Precious Prince	27.99	1 December 1984	Northern Flat final
460	Debbies Time	27.74	April 1985	Northern Oaks final
460	Fearless Action	27.57	19 October 1985	Manchester Puppy Cup heats
460	Fearless Action	27.56	24 October 1985	Manchester Puppy Cup semi-f
460	Fearless Action	27.51	17 May 1986	
460	Fearless Action	27.50	27 September 1986	
465	Upade Joe	27.37	11 May 2001	
465	Bat On	27.36	13 February 2005	
465	Bat On	27.34	10 May 2005	Gold Collar Final
465	Moatview Lady	27.34	7 August 2005	
465 hurdles	Meanus Dandy	28.13	27 August 1977	
465 hurdles	Bewitching Tess	29.34	15 March 1986	
465 hurdles	Distant Panther	28.99	24 September 1988	
465 hurdles	Greek Commander	28.60	2 August 1994	
465 hurdles	Born to Go	28.15	24 July 2001	
465 hurdles	Drive Up Sam	27.92	6 July 2004	
470	Sky Blue Honcho	28.04	18 August 2005	
470	Fear Me	27.45	17 September 2005	Manchester Puppy Cup Heats
470	Geordie Parker	27.41	13 July 2006	Northern Flat Semi-finals
470	Barnfield On Air	27.32	27 September 2007	Laurels Heats
470 hurdles	Taipan	28.25	24 October 2006	
590	Thunderbird Two	35.11	13 November 2005	
590	Vatican Jinky	35.06	25 September 2007	Gold Collar Final
645	Montreen	39.25	9 April 1977	
645	Fergus Rock	40.69	24 July 1984	
645	Glenbrien Smut	40.08	28 September 1985	
645	Aglish Blaze	39.64	16 August 1994	
645 hurdles	January Prince	42.00	14 April 1962	
647	Drumsna Cross	39.53	10 August 2000	
647	Creamery Puzzle	39.11	29 June 2004	Cock o' the North semi-finals
647	Roxholme Girl	39.01	25 November 2004	Gold Collar Final
647	Roxholme Girl	38.96	10 May 2005	
647	Zigzag Kit	38.95	18 August 2005	Cock o' the North heats
647	Zigzag Kit	38.85	23 August 2005	Cock o' the North semi-finals
647 hurdles	El Tenor	41.09	18 May 1999	
670	Roxholme Boy	40.54	20 July 2006	Cock o' the North heats
670	Calzaghe Frisby	40.30	24 October 2006	
670	Hurleys Hero	40.18	9 June 2009	Cock o' the North Final
815	Visiting Time	50.88	6 September 1980	
815	Laden Jennie	52.30	15 September 1984	
853	Scurlogue Champ	54.78	21 September 1987	
853	Scurlogue Champ	54.62	28 September 1987	
853	Decoy Lynx	54.59	17 June 1994	
875	Let Us Know	54.50	23 October 2001	
878	Roxholme Girl	54.33	18 March 2006	Television Trophy Heats

Pre-metric

Yards	Greyhound	Time	Date	Notes
500	Wild Woolley	28.49	1 June 1932	Northern Flat final, world record
500	Jamboree Reveller	28.40	20 April 1940	
500	Dark Hissop	28.27	July 1946	
500	Newceston Ration	28.07	1950	
500	Rushton Spot	27.73	21 July 1954	
700	Congleton Lord	40.95	4 May 1938	
700	Killcoran Castle	40.83	1950	
700	Come To Johnny	40.12	10 October 1959	
700	Mighty Kern	40.07	25 July 1964	
700	Stolen Silver		August 1968	
700	Meronome	39.96	1970	
700	Knock Off	39.38	1971	8 runner race
880	Tanyard Princess	51.69	5 December 1959	
880	Chantilly Lace	51.38	1961	TV Trophy final
880	Meteoric	50.94	24 October 1964	
934	Western Stream	55.30	28 July 1951	
500 H	Douro	29.45	26 September 1928	National Record
500 H	Moorbrook Airmouse	29.19	25 July 1959	
500 H	Mystic Scamp	=29.19	11 August 1965	
500 H	Blue Sprite	29.12	11 August 1965	
500 H	Feakles Wish	28.92	1970	
700 H	Grouncil	43.91	20 September 1933	
525 C	Clarehill Rambler	30.02	8 August 1959	chase
525 C	Clarehill Rambler	=30.02	15 August 1959	chase

== Issues ==
In 2008, The Sunday Times revealed that Belle Vue greyhounds had been sent for research at Liverpool Veterinary School by Charles Pickering. The Greyhound Board of Great Britain Disciplinary Committee found Pickering in breach of nine rules of racing and ordered that he be made a Warned Off person and fined the sum of £5,000. An incident during 2010 raised concerns over injury rates at Belle Vue. As of 2017 all injury data was made publicly available and independently verified. A 2012 article by the Sunday Express alleged that the kennels of two trainers were kept in unacceptable conditions and highlighted welfare issues. In 2018 licensing and inspecting trainer's kennels was changed and to be conducted through the government-approved, UKAS accredited method.

== See also ==
- 1926 UK & Ireland Greyhound Racing Year
