= 1978 Irish Greyhound Derby =

- Venue: Shelbourne Park
- Location: Dublin
- End date: 29 July
- Total prize money: £20,000 (winner)

The 1978 Irish Greyhound Derby took place during June and July with the final being held at Shelbourne Park in Dublin on 29 July 1978.

The winner Pampered Rover won £20,000 and was trained by Paddy Keane and owned and bred by Joe Phelan. The competition was sponsored by Carrolls.

== Final result ==
At Shelbourne, 29 July (over 525 yards):

Position	Winner	Breeding	Trap	SP	Time	Trainer
1st	Pampered Rover	Time Up Please - Pampered Peggy	1	10-1	29.23	Paddy Keane
2nd	Heres Tat	Here Sonny - Spiral Dash	2	15-8f	29.35	Ger McKenna
3rd	Malange	Broadford Boy - Paper Cracker	4	10-1	29.51	Matt O'Donnell
4th	Ahaveen Spitfire	Itsachampion - Ivy Hall Joy	6	10-1	29.63	Dan Curtin
5th	Ivy Hall Solo	Time Up Please - Kilcox Damsel	5	5-1	29.79	Denis Hoctor
6th	Hunday Dook	Hunday Champion - She's Knocking	3	2-1	29.87	Francie Murray

=== Distances ===
1½, 2, 1½, 2, 1 (lengths)

== Competition Report ==
Ger McKenna was once again the trainer of the ante-post favourite for the Irish Derby, this time it was with Here's Tat. With no Welsh Greyhound Derby there was a bigger gap to the start of the event than usual.

When the first round got underway it was National Produce Stakes champion Always Kelly that was the fastest heat winner in 29.15.

Here's Tat went fastest in round two after recording 29.04, followed by Hunday Dook in 29.05 and English Derby finalist Glenroe Hiker (29.09). Glenroe Hiker attracted support and went into the quarter finals on a par in the ante-post lists with Here's Tat. During the quarter finals Glenroe Hiker recorded 29.08 and Hunday Dook won again in 29.10, there were also heat successes for Pampered Rover and Killaclug Jet.

Two strong looking semi-finals then took place, firstly Ivy Hall Solo and Here's Tat vied with each other in a battle that ending in a sensational winning time of 28.85 for Ivy Hall Solo. In the second decider Hunday Dook continued to impress and crossed the line in 28.93 ahead of Malange. The third semi was a slower heat with Ahaveen Spitfire beating Pampered Rover in 29.35.

The first prize of £20,000 equalled the English Derby prize and went to the outsider Pampered Rover after he was very fast out of the traps and took the decisive lead at the first bend from Hunday Dook and trouble behind ensured that the rest of the field could not make inroads into the leader. Pampered Rover's success meant that trainer Paddy Keane became the first trainer to lift the Irish and English Derby.

== See also ==
- 1978 UK & Ireland Greyhound Racing Year
