= 1974 Irish Greyhound Derby =

- Venue: Shelbourne Park
- Location: Dublin
- End date: 27 July
- Total prize money: £10,000 (winner)

The 1974 Irish Greyhound Derby took place during June and July with the final being held at Shelbourne Park in Dublin on 27 July 1974.

The winner Lively Band won £10,000 and was trained by Jack Murphy, owned by Cyril Scotland and bred by Denis Clancy. The competition was sponsored by Carrolls.

== Final result ==
At Shelbourne, 27 July (over 525 yards):

Position	Winner	Breeding	Trap	SP	Time	Trainer
1st	Lively Band	Silver Hope - Kell's Queen	1	5-4f	29.11	Jack Murphy
2nd	Windjammer	Sirius - Big Gamble	3	10-1	29.31	Ger McKenna
3rd	Myrtown	Myross Again - Longstown Lassie	6	6-4	29.79	Eddie Moore
4th	Boolas Duchess	Own Pride - Boola's Countess	4			James Doran
5th	Shady Wagger	Winter Hope - Shady Donato	5			Harry Barry
6th	Quote Me	The Grand Silver - Gruelling Point	2	10-1	00.00	Moira O'Callaghan

=== Distances ===
2½, 6 (lengths)

== Competition Report ==
Myrtown travelled over to Ireland for the 1974 Irish Derby hoping to go one place better than his 1974 English Greyhound Derby campaign but would face Ireland's best greyhounds. Prominent owner Cyril Scotland (owner of 1972 winner Catsrock Daisy) would enter another leading contender called Lively Band, a fawn dog who possessed significant early pace and had won the Derby consolation at White City.

Myrtown was ante-post favourite and progressed through the mandatory first round. Fastest in the round was Tain Rua who recorded 29.30.

The second round featured eight heats run on the same night for the first time and included a formidable race in which Myrtown won from Lively Band in 29.20. Other winners included the Irish TV Trophy winner Waverley Supreme and Nelson Blast but Tommy Astaire was eliminated. In the quarter-finals Myrtown won in 29.00 and still looked like the one to beat. Nelsons Blast set a time of 29.12 before Lively Band recorded 29.05; the remaining heat went to Shady Wagger.

Myrtown suffered his first defeat in the semi-finals losing out to Shady Wagger; Lively Band won the other semi from National Produce Stakes champion Quote Me and Windjammer.

The final draw proved pivotal because Lively Band and Myrtown both broke well from the traps but the latter found trouble trying to get across to the rails which allowed the Jack Murphy trained Lively Band to ease to victory from the strong finishing Windjammer. Quote Me failed to finish with a serious injury.

== See also ==
- 1974 UK & Ireland Greyhound Racing Year
