= 1926 UK & Ireland Greyhound Racing Year =

Greyhound racing year

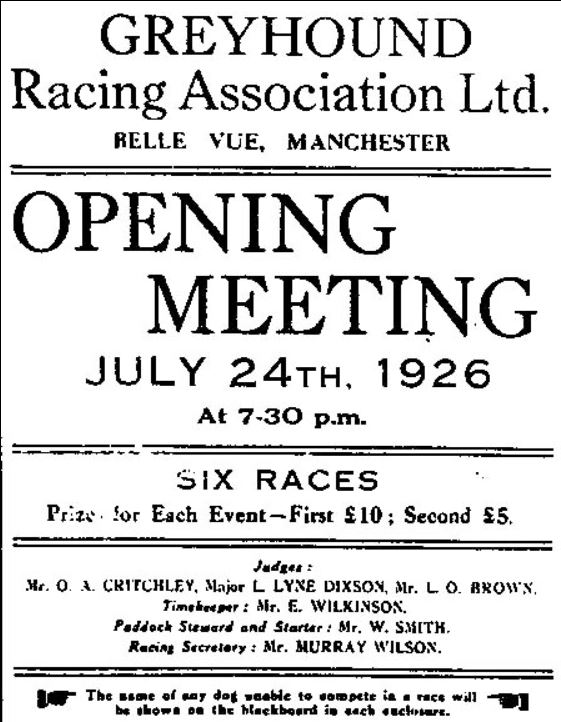

The 1926 UK & Ireland Greyhound Racing Year was the inaugural year of 'track' greyhound racing in the United Kingdom.

== Origins ==
On the 6 March 1876, near the Welsh Harp, Hendon, an early attempt to introduce mechanical track greyhound racing took place. It was on a straight course 400 yards long, with the hare being drawn along the ground at the end of a cord, which was wound around a windlass. The venture did not appeal to the public because although the fastest greyhound would always win, the cleverest (best tracker) did not.

In 1890, a patent was taken out for a circular greyhound racing track but was never put into practice, due to the patent owner not having financial backing. Five years later a mechanical lure was used in Ireland and again failed.

== Summary ==
Thirty years later in 1925, Charles Alexander Munn, an American businessman, who had seen greyhound racing in the United States came over to the United Kingdom and teamed up with Owen P. Smith and George Sawyer for the rights to promote the British greyhound racing as an alternative to coursing which was the primary form of greyhound racing in the United Kingdom and Ireland. Munn met with Major L. Lyne Dixson (a leading figure in British field sports) and the pair decided to find other supporters despite the fact that the General Strike of 1926 was looming.

The two men eventually met Brigadier-General Alfred Critchley, who in turn introduced them to Sir William Gentle JP. Eventually they raised £22,000 and formed a company called the Greyhound Racing Association Ltd, or GRA for short. When the GRA were deciding where to situate a new stadium they thought Manchester was an ideal place because of its sporting and gambling links. The company constructed the first custom-built greyhound stadium near the city centre and called it Belle Vue Stadium, where the very first race around an oval track in Britain was held on 24 July 1926 at 7.30 pm.

With over one million people unemployed and the first general strike in history taking place and troops had been deployed to trouble spots throughout Britain. Greyhound racing offered an affordable day out, away from all of the issues and as a result greyhound racing underwent remarkable growth over the next decade.

Only 1,700 people attended the first meeting at Belle Vue and they watched six races with seven dogs in each race. A greyhound called 'Mistley' won the first ever race over 440 yards, running the quarter-mile flat course in 25.00 seconds, Mistley romped home eight lengths clear at 6/1. Fifty years later a stand was named after Mistley.

Belle Vue ran many races with seven runners per race but after the formation of the National Greyhound Racing Club (NGRC) in 1928, the maximum number of dogs per race was limited to six, although this rule was to change several times during the century. The colours of the racing jackets that night were - trap 1-red, 2-blue, 3-white, 4-green, 5-black, 6-orange & 7-red and white. Racing was very erratic compared to today because the greyhounds lining up were various mixes of former coursing hounds with no experience of oval racing except for a scattering of trials. Winning distances for the six races were 8, 1, 12, 10, 5 & 2 lengths.

The GRA actually lost £50 on the first night because of the small attendance but the following week the crowds turned out in force; more than 16,000 people attended the meeting and within a short space of time "going to the dogs" became a national pastime. From the first meeting in July to the day the GRA closed for the winter break just three months later on 29 October, over 11,000 racegoers (per meeting) had paid to watch each of the 37 meetings. During those meetings there had been 221 races. The consortium repaid a £10,000 bank loan and shares in the new company rose from their initial value of one shilling to £37 10s. Two Belfast bookmakers called Joe Shaw and Hugh McAlinden visited Belle Vue during 1926 with the intention of gaining ideas to start track racing in Ireland.

The greyhounds themselves were generally supplied by coursing trainers, owners and breeders such as Sidney Orton, a Norfolk farmer who sold 17 greyhounds to Belle Vue for £170. A brindle greyhound called Mutton Cutlet, whelped in March 1921, had contested the Waterloo Cup in 1923, 1924 and 1925 and finished runner up in the Waterloo Plate in 1924. In 1926, he was brought by Tom Morris, keeper of the Irish Stud book. Morris put him to stud, demanding a fee of 10 guineas. Mutton Cutlet became the first major breeding sire (male parent) in track racing.

=== Tracks opened ===
- Belle Vue Stadium (opened 24 July)

=== Competitions ===
- None started
