= 1975 Irish Greyhound Derby =

- Venue: Shelbourne Park
- Location: Dublin
- End date: 26 July
- Total prize money: £11,000 (winner)

The 1975 Irish Greyhound Derby took place during June and July with the final being held at Shelbourne Park in Dublin on 26 July 1975.

The winner Shifting Shadow won £11,000 and was trained by Podger Molloy, owned by Brian Donovan and Michael Cummiskey and bred by Paddy O'Connor. The competition was sponsored by Carrolls.

== Final result ==
At Shelbourne, 26 July (over 525 yards):

Position	Winner	Breeding	Trap	SP	Time	Trainer
1st	Shifting Shadow	Clonsherry - Queens Parachute	1	9-4f	29.35	Podger Molloy
2nd	Moonshine Bandit	Yanka Boy - Westpark Roma	3	6-1	29.43	Jeremiah Hurley
3rd	Macbeth	Yanka Boy - Gallant and Gay	6	4-1	29.51	Mrs L Paterson
unplaced	Sage	Monalee Champion - Itsamint	2	3-1		William McNair
unplaced	Brave Bran	The Grand Silver - Rosemoth	5	7-1		Christy Daly
unplaced	Again and Again	Wonderful Era - Little Pilgrim	4	6-1		Dermot O'Rourke

=== Distances ===
1, 1 (lengths)

== Competition Report ==
Ger McKenna's Shamrock Point was the leading runner in the ante-post lists. Two major names missing were the defending champion Lively Band because he had retired to stud and dual Derby finalist Myrtown. Only two favourites out of 17 won in the opening round, Shamrock Point being the fastest of them in 29.18 with next best being Tory Snowball in 29.21.

Shamrock Point won in 29.03 in round two, the white and black dog had suffered misfortune during the English Derby final the previous year before winning the consolation. The next best were Cindy's Speck and Sage both winners in 29.44.

The quarter finals arrived and Shamrock Point was beaten by Cindy's Speck and Win Sam won another with a greyhound called Tain Mor eliminated. Shifting Shadow, a £600 purchase by Podger Molloy from Paddy O'Connor won the third before a controversy ensued in the fourth and final quarter final. Clopook Ivy was disqualified after passing the line first but Clopook Ivy’s owner Cora Jones disagreed with the disqualification and was granted a temporary injunction against Shelbourne Greyhound Stadium Ltd from holding the semi-finals. A few days later the High Court reversed the injunction but then the Supreme Court had to deal with an appeal before agreeing with the High Court. All this meant that the semi-finals were delayed and started four days later than scheduled.

The racing resumed and Shifting Shadow trained by Podger Molloy beat Moonshine Bandit and Sage with favourite Cindy's Speck failing to progress. The second semi-final race resulted in the elimination of Shamrock Point who found serious trouble leaving Macbeth to cross the line first from Again and Again.

In the final was considered by the public to be weaker than previous editions. During the final Shifting Shadow broke well from the traps and took a course on the rails, leading all the way and winning from Moonshine Bandit and Macbeth.

== See also ==
- 1975 UK & Ireland Greyhound Racing Year
