= White City Stadium (Manchester) =

Former sports venue in Manchester, England

- Location: Old Trafford, Greater Manchester
- Coordinates: 53°27′43″N 2°17′00″W
- Opened: 1927
- Closed: 1982

White City Stadium was a greyhound racing and speedway stadium in Old Trafford, Greater Manchester, England.

== Construction ==
Manchester is synonymous with greyhound racing because Belle Vue Stadium became the first greyhound track in the United Kingdom and Ireland to hold oval course racing in 1926. One year later on 1 November 1927 the remaining eleven acres out of a sixteen-acre plot of land belonging to the Royal Botanical Gardens was sold to Canine Sports Ltd and a stadium was speedily constructed. The stadium in the Old Trafford area was south of the Chester Road tramway and north of Talbot Road.

== Opening ==
The first meeting took place on 28 May 1928 followed by speedway on 16 June 1928. The circuit circumference was listed as 448 2/3 yd (410.3 m) with distances of 500 yd (460 m), 525 yd (480 m), 700 yd (640 m) and 725 yd (663 m) behind an "Inside Sumner" hare system. The circuit was described as having wide well banked turns.

== Pre war history ==
One of the first track trainers was J. Madden who trained Loose Card to victory in the 1929 Scurry Gold Cup and just one year later the Greyhound Racing Association (GRA) purchased the stadium. The GRA owned multiple tracks including Belle Vue.

White City struggled to match the popularity of Belle Vue and another rival track the Audenshaw Greyhound Racing and Sports Ground started in racing in 1932. In June of the same year a greyhound called Wild Woolley was propelled to national fame when winning the English Greyhound Derby for White City trainer Jack Rimmer and owner Sam Johnson. Wild Woolley defeated the legendary Mick the Miller and Future Cutlet by a neck in the final. The following year Future Cutlet became the Derby champion and Wild Woolley finished third place despite being the favourite on this occasion.

The principal pre-war event was the Wilkinson Memorial Challenge Cup and amenities at the track included a home straight Grand Enclosure that offered catering and licensed bar facilities in the Members club. Starting from the back straight was the Popular Enclosure which continued around the third and fourth bends. The kennel facilities were at sister track Belle Vue and contained 320 electrically heated kennels situated well behind the first and second bends of the Belle Vue circuit. The fact that the greyhounds were housed at Belle Vue meant that the trainers at the time were attached both to Belle Vue and White City.

== Post war history ==
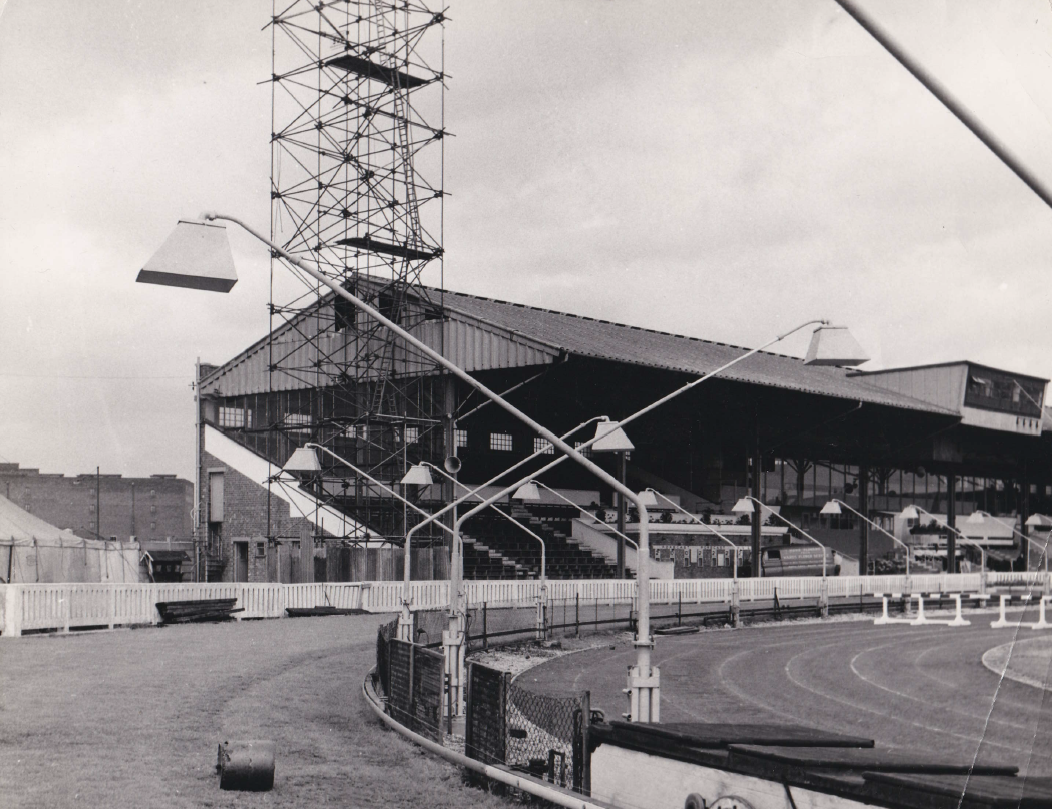
White City Stadium, Manchester c.1950

After the war business boomed and totalisator turnover in 1946 was £1,878,980. A Derby final appearance by a greyhound called Lacken Invader was trained by L. Hague.

A new Racing Manager (RM) by the name of Charlie Birch took control during the 1950s and a new cinder track being installed for athletics in 1953. In 1959 Birch was replaced by R W Payne after Birch moved to Harringay Stadium. Payne was in turn replaced by A W Williams. In 1960 the Cock O’the North, a major race was inaugurated and six years later the Manchester Cup was switched from sister track Belle Vue. Stan Mitchell a recent training addition from Perry Barr Stadium trained Barrys Shamrock when he won the first running of the Manchester Cup at White City in 1966.

The trainers supplying runners in the 1960s were Stan Mitchell, Wilf France, Percy Stagg, W Holland, G England and Bill Adams. In the early 1970s three new trainers Eddie Moore, Harry Bamford and Ron Saunders joined. In 1971 the experiment by the GRA to introduce eight dog races went into full swing with trials at Harringay and racing at Belle Vue and White City.

Eddie Moore's Myrtown, a dark brindle dog finished runner up to Jimsun in the 1974 English Greyhound Derby and one year later he made the 1975 English Greyhound Derby final again. Trainers continued to join the track in the late 1970s George Barnett and Jack Hurt were two such trainers, the latter experienced success with a greyhound called Kilbelin Ruler and Hurt had arrived from Preston Greyhound Stadium in 1977.

== Speedway ==
Dirt track racing started on Saturday 16 June 1928 and finished in 1930 but was revived for a meeting in 1958.

== Stock car racing ==
The stadium started to host BriSCA Formula 1 Stock Cars run by Mike Parker Promotions in 1972. The track was originally a very bumpy shale surface, but was tarmaced in 1976, by Mike Parker. The BriSCA Formula 1 Stock Cars World Championship World Final race was held twice at White City. In 1976 the race was won by Stuart Bamforth, and in 1979 by Frankie Wainman. The racing continued until the end of the 1981 season.

== Closure ==
Later R Thomas became RM assisted by Ian Travis but the GRA Property Trust which was an offshoot of the GRA were actively selling large city sites and White City fell into that category.

The stadium was sold to developers during 1981 and the stadium closed during 1982. A few years later it was demolished to make way for the retail park. The white colonnaded entrance gateway in Chester Road remains.

== Competitions ==
=== Manchester Cup ===
Year	Winner	Breeding	Trainer	Time	SP
1958	Ballypatrick	The Grand Champion – D.West	Cyril Beaumont (Belle Vue)	29.39	4-7f
1959	Dancing Sheik	Imperial Dancer – Delias Green	Ted Brennan (Owlerton)	29.50	2-1f
1961	The Red Rapparee	The Grand Fire – Lisamote Princess	Austin Hiscock (Belle Vue)	29.54	
1962	Faithful Charlie	Glittering Look – Lady Artic	Jim Irving (Private)	29.41	
1963	Dalcassian Son	Champions Son – Dalcassian Elf	Austin Hiscock (Belle Vue)	29.43	
1964	Sanhedrim	Odd Venture – Single Peeper	Harry Bamford (Private)	29.34	6-4f
1965	Sanhedrim	Odd Venture – Single Peeper	Harry Bamford (Private)	29.04	
1966	Barrys Shamrock	Bermudas Cloud – Dromiskin Lass	Stan Mitchell (White City Manchester)	29.80	
1967	Forward Flash	Crazy Parachute - Supreme Witch	Jack Brennan (Owlerton)	30.31	
1968	Special Martell	Good Brandy – Tansy's Special	Stan Mitchell (White City Manchester)	29.92	
1969	Desert Kuda	Kilbeg Kuda – Far Down	Jim Irving (Private)	29.86	5-1
1970	Always A Monarch	Always Proud – Libe Latinus	Eddie Moore (White City Manchester)	29.49	5-2
1971	John Silver	Faithful Hope - Trojan Silver	Barbara Tompkins (Private)	29.50	
1972	Allowdale Era	Wonderful Era – Careless Smack	Eddie Moore (White City Manchester)	30.24	5-1
1973	Fly Dazzler	Kilbeg Kuda – Nualas Lovely	Norman Oliver (Brough Park)	29.08	3-1
1974	Deise Valiant	Valiant Ray – Greenville Band	Ron Saunders (White City Manchester)	29.12	4-6f
1975	Myrtown	Myross Again – Longstown Lassie	Eddie Moore (White City Manchester)	29.00	
1976	El Teide	Own Pride – Steal Out Ron	Ron Chamberlain (Private)	29.99	14-1
1977	Chensu Mula	Sole Aim – Mark Heather	Ted Parker (Harringay)	29.56	1-1f
1978	Clashing Breeze	Clashing – Princess Painter	Eddie Moore (Belle Vue)	29.85	
1979	Kilbelin Ruler	Supreme Fun - Duritza	George Barnett (White City Manchester)	30.03	
1980	Cushie Snowball			30.09	
1981	Oakdene Sonny	Here Sonny – Keslake Yanka	Eddie Moore (Belle Vue)	29.75	7-4

(1958-65 Belle Vue), (1966–81 White City Manchester)

== Track records ==
Pre-metric

Distance yards	Greyhound	Time	Date
500	Coynes Castle	28.55	22.05.1946
500	Baytown Dagger	28.04	13.06.1955
525	Tindani	30.01	15.10.1941
525	Jersey Creamery	29.65	1948
525	Grangelough	29.21	15.06.1959
525	Riobally Shaun	=29.21	24.09.1959
525	Poor Linda	29.00	27.07.1964
525	That Cailin	28.94	1970
700	Pork	41.26	24.05.1934
700	Dark Hissop	41.07	1946
700	S.S America	40.18	11.05.1959
725	Clady Border	42.26	1946
725	Blackberry Rambler	42.16	02.04.1956
725	Mighty Kern	41.15	30.07.1964
880	Rozels Blue Girl	50.63	15.06.1964
949	Baytown Dentist	56.40	04.07.1955
525 H	Donovan	31.29	28.07.1932
525 H	Mr Immaculate	30.28	04.06.1959
525 H	Hunters Gift	30.04	14.05.1964
525 H	Beamons Feat	30.00	1970

Post-metric

Distance metres	Greyhound	Time	Date
255	Bunker Prince	15.15	15.08.1980
485	Myrtown	28.76	05.05.1976
670	Croghan Hostess	41.12	13.10.1969
485 H	Beamons Feat	30.00	30.10.1969
485 H	Strebor Gem	30.00	10.06.1973
