= 1978 English Greyhound Derby =

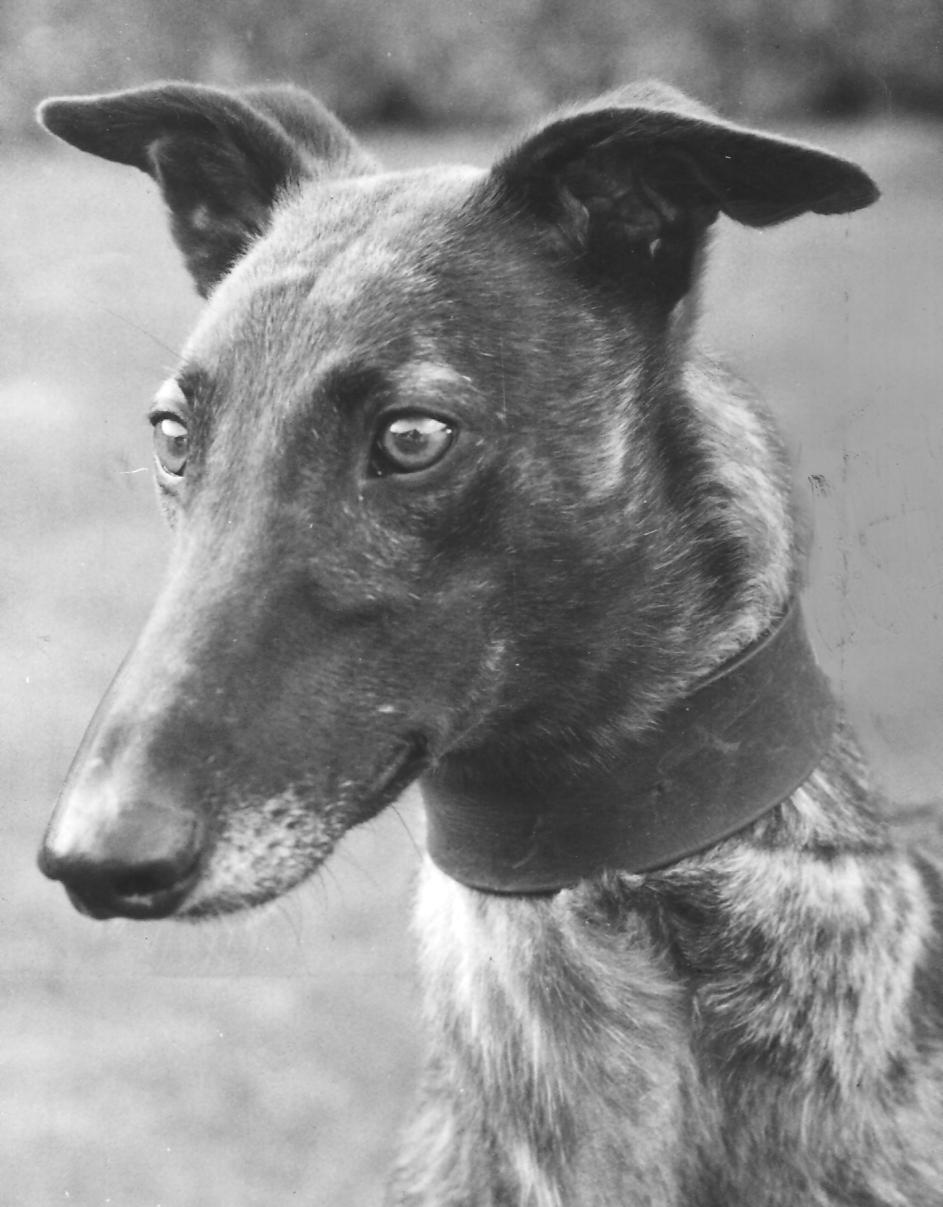
- Lacca Champion
- Location: White City Stadium
- Start date: 20 May
- End date: 1 July
- Total prize money: £20,000 (winner)

The 1978 Spillers Greyhound Derby took place during May, June and July with the final being held on 1 July 1978 at White City Stadium. The winner was Lacca Champion and the winning owners Paul Howell, Sandra Howell and David Hill received a record £20,000. The competition was sponsored by the Spillers.

== Competition Report ==
The Derby attracted a significant number of runners from Ireland with 21 of the 163 hopefuls making the journey. The first round was held at different tracks which proved unpopular. Scurry Gold Cup champion Jet Control ran in a heat the night after winning the Laurels.

Ante-post favourite Witchs Champion went out in round two and Heres Tat ran well below expectation but the Ger McKenna trained greyhound retained the overall favouritism. The Pat and Linda Mullins pair of Lacca Champion and Paradise Spectre both progressed as did Balliniska Band. The erratic Glen Rock who had recorded the fastest trial of the year at the track (29.47) also progressed but failed at the quarter-final stage.

The third round ended the challenge of defending champion Balliniska Band following two dislocated toes. The fastest heat winner was Geoff De Mulder's Dale Lad in a time of 29.30. The quarter-finals resulted in another win for Lacca Champion who remained unbeaten and Irish sprinter Glenroe Hiker led all the way in his heat but Paradise Spectre went out.

The long format of the competition now meant that the semifinals would be the fifth run for the greyhounds. The first semi resulted in a fifth win for Lacca Champion after he matched the early pace of Glenroe Hiker out of the traps; All Wit took third place. In the second semi Mulcair Rocket the 6-4f trained by Emil Kovac missed the break leaving Superior Model winning from Backdeed Man and Great Ali.

Six contenders lined up for the final and Lacca Champion was sent off 6-4 favourite. Out of the traps he was led by Glenroe Hiker, but Lacca Champion maintained his challenge and went on to win from Backdeed Man in 29.42sec, with the early leader fading into fifth. Lacca Champion had gone through the Derby unbeaten with the added anomaly of winning his first round heat at Harringay Stadium.

== Final result ==
At White City (over 500 metres):

Position	Name of Greyhound	Breeding	Trap	SP	Time	Trainer
1st	Lacca Champion	Itsachampion - Highland Finch	3	6-4f	29.42	Pat Mullins (Private)
2nd	Backdeed Man	Flaming King - Beachwalk Lady	6	6-1	29.56	David McClenaghan (Ireland)
3rd	All Wit	Monalee Champion - Dunally	5	7-1	29.76	Frank Baldwin (Perry Barr)
4th	Superior Model	Right O' Myross - Dusty Silver	1	5-1	29.78	Bob Hall (Private)
5th	Glenroe Hiker	Monalee Hiker - Glenroe Dasher	4	9-4	29.90	Colm McGrath (Ireland)
6th	Great Ali	Tartan Khan - Blues Babe	2	16-1	29.96	Ted Griffin (Bletchley)

=== Distances ===
1¾, 2½, head, 1½, ¾ (lengths)
The distances between the greyhounds are in finishing order and shown in lengths. One length is equal to 0.08 of one second.

== Quarter-finals ==
Heat 1 (June 22)
Pos	Name	SP	Time
1st	Lacca Champion	4-6f	29.58
2nd	All Wit	9-2	29.61
3rd	Dull Morning	20-1	29.75
4th	Bubbling Away	14-1	29.83
5th	Sophronia	5-1	29.93
6th	Tiger Jazz	12-1	

Heat 2 (June 22)
Pos	Name	SP	Time
1st	Backdeed Man	6-1	29.70
2nd	Superior Model	10-1	29.72
3rd	Fairbourn Paddy	50-1	29.78
4th	Ashcarne Bronco	9-4	29.79
5th	Glen Rock	5-4f	29.87
6th	Donal's Greatest	9-2	30.05

Heat 3 (June 22)
Pos	Name	SP	Time
1st	Mulcair Rocket	2-1	29.65
2nd	Lesleys Charm	12-1	29.85
3rd	Great Ali	6-1	29.95
4th	Bye A Mile	6-4f	30.11
5th	Man of Tudor	8-1	30.19
6th	Toms Chance	16-1	30.29

Heat 4 (June 22)
Pos	Name	SP	Time
1st	Glenroe Hiker	13-8	29.77
2nd	Dolla Arkle	40-1	29.99
3rd	Malange	12-1	30.03
4th	Paradise Spectre	5-1	30.11
5th	Durfold Dandy	33-1	30.25
6th	Dale Lad	5-4f	30.37

== Semifinals ==
First Semifinal (Jun 24)
Pos	Name of Greyhound	SP	Time	Trainer
1st	Lacca Champion	11-4	29.31	Mullins
2nd	Glenroe Hiker	11-8f	29.61	McGrath
3rd	All Wit	11-4	29.65	Baldwin
4th	Malange	10-1	29.73	O'Donnell
5th	Fairbourn Paddy	25-1	29.81	
6th	Dull Morning	40-1	30.09	Briggs

Second Semifinal (Jun 24)
Pos	Name of Greyhound	SP	Time	Trainer
1st	Superior Model	4-1	29.72	Hall
2nd	Backdeed Man	3-1	29.76	McClenaghan
3rd	Great Ali	16-1	29.82	Griffin
4th	Lesley's Charm	12-1	29.92	
5th	Mulcair Rocket	6-4f	29.95	Kovac
6th	Dolla Arkle	8-1	30.03	Coleman

== See also ==
- 1978 UK & Ireland Greyhound Racing Year
