= 1978 UK & Ireland Greyhound Racing Year =

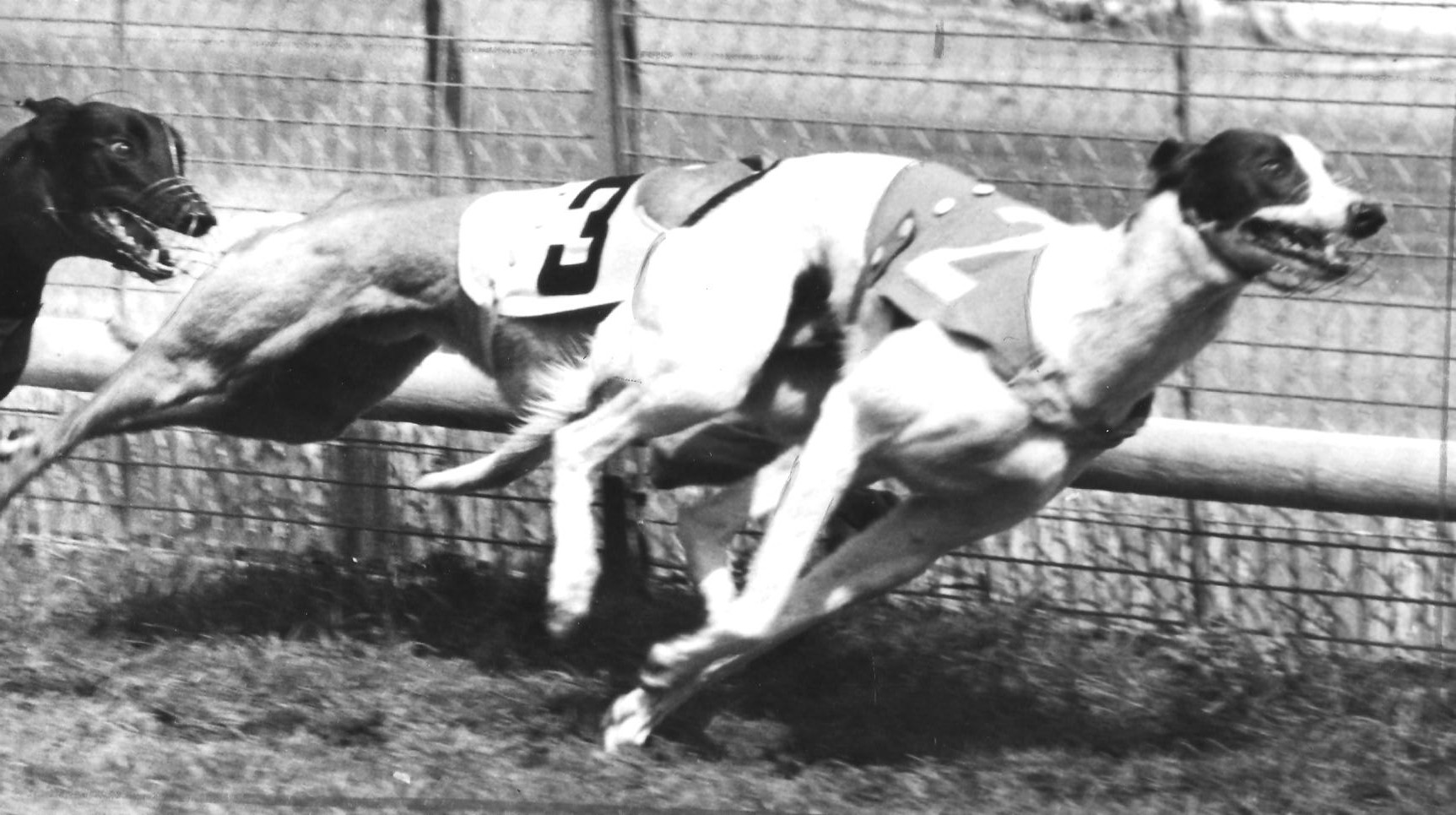
- Pat Seamur, 1978 Scottish Derby champion

The 1978 UK & Ireland Greyhound Racing Year was the 53rd year of greyhound racing in the United Kingdom and the 52nd year of greyhound racing in Ireland.

== Roll of honour ==
Major Winners
Award	Name of Winner
1978 English Greyhound Derby	Lacca Champion
1978 Irish Greyhound Derby	Pampered Rover
1978 Scottish Greyhound Derby	Pat Seamur
Greyhound Trainer of the Year	Geoff De Mulder
Greyhound of the Year	Lacca Champion
Irish Greyhound of the Year	Pampered Rover
Trainers Championship	Ted Dickson

== Summary ==
The National Greyhound Racing Club (NGRC) released the annual returns, with totalisator turnover up, at £71,504,284 and attendances down, recorded at 6,027,327 from 5688 meetings.

Lacca Champion, a brindle dog trained by Pat Mullins was voted the Greyhound of the Year after winning the 1978 English Greyhound Derby.

Paddy Keane became the first trainer to win both the English Greyhound Derby and Irish Greyhound Derby following the 1978 Irish Greyhound Derby win by Pampered Rover.

== Tracks ==
Ramsgate owners Northern Sports bought Oxford in April, with the proviso from the council that the Stadium must be used as a recreational Stadium until 1983. The Managing Director David Hawkins changed the stadium name back to Oxford Stadium from Cowley Stadium; Bob Newson was appointed the General Manager and Jim Layton would soon arrive as Racing Manager from Catford. Northern Sports also owned Doncaster and then added independent track Long Eaton to their portfolio bringing four tracks under their banner.

Brandon Stadium in Coventry opened on 19 September. Independent track Cambridge had a second attempt at NGRC racing on 24 November; the previous attempt had only lasted five months. This second spell would be more successful with top trainers Joe Cobbold, Natalie Savva and Pat Mullins taking attachments at the track over the next couple of years.

Watford closed on 30 October; the site would now only be used by the football club. As a consequence the BAGS contract went to Willenhall.

== News ==
The Greyhound Racing Association (GRA) made a profit which helped pay back some of their debt. The sale of the land that formerly housed Harringay Arena boosted the profits.

Trainer Phil Rees Sr. retired from training and his licence was handed to his son Phil Rees Jr. The latter chose not to take part in the trainer's championship because he had qualified by virtue of his fathers achievements in 1977. Gordon Hodson returned from Australia to take up a contract trainer's position at Brighton and two respected trainers Sid Ryall and Dave Barker retired. After a decade at Brighton, Peter Shotton took the role of head of racing at Wembley followed to the track by his assistant Jim Cremin. Other Racing Managers on the move were Jim Simpson to Romford from Crayford, Des Nichols moved to Brighton from Romford just one year after taking over from Les Cox. Paul Richardson took the chair at Brough Park and Gosforth replacing Tony Smith who switched to Crayford. At Hall Green Assistant Racing Manager Horace Peplow retired after 50 years on the racing staff and was replaced by Simon Harris son of former trainer the late Roger Harris.

John McCririck was brought in as an investigative reporter for the Sporting Life. In 1978, McCririck was voted the Specialist Writer of the Year in the British Press Awards. His stories included a sting that he had exposed based on the fact that Extel, who used to broadcast commentaries into betting shops, gave the off-times for greyhound races in minutes, without the refinement of seconds. By briefly delaying the commentaries, criminals were able to back dogs after a race had started.

During the same year McCririck took the lead in covering the Rochester Stadium coup. The track had decided to hold a dual distance event with heats over 277 metres and a final over 901 metres, unusual competitions were seen as an interesting way of presenting racing by several management teams. Two greyhounds trained by Jack Purvis both won sprint heats, Leysdown Pleasure at 33-1 and Leysdown Fun at 4–1. They had been backed off course by five South London men winning a reputed £350,000. Fun was withdrawn from the 901 metre final and Pleasure finished last, not staying the distance. BOLA advised its members to withhold payment and the Big Four Bookmakers refused to pay out. The NGRC held an inquiry and found no evidence of rule breaking. The police submitted a report to the DPP (Director of Public Prosecutions) who also took no action. It appeared that a legitimate coup had been staged and a protest resulted where 800 betting shop offices had their locks super-glued for not paying out. It was not until 1985 that a judge agreed that bookmakers were not liable to pay out.

== Competitions ==
Greenfield Fox trained by Ted Dickson continued his fine form carried over from 1977 by claiming the Scurry Gold Cup in April from favourite Lacca Champion. Another Pat Mullins greyhound Paradise Spectre (the Grand Prix champion) won the Guys and Dolls trophy and won 18 consecutive races from 9 September 1977 to 4 February 1978.

Dickson had a superb year winning the Trainers Championship at Monmore, where he gained five winners, Donals Greatest, Rip Perry, Kudas Toy, Lesleys Charm and Black Legend.

== Principal UK races ==
Trainers Championship, (Monmore)
Pos	Name of Trainer	Points
1st	Ted Dickson	52
2nd	Natalie Savva	37
3rd	Geoff De Mulder	32
4th	Barbara Tompkins	30
5th	George Curtis	25
6th	John Coleman	24

BBC TV Trophy, Walthamstow (Apr 5, 820m, £1,500)
Pos	Name of Greyhound	Trainer	SP	Time	Trap
1st	Westown Adam	Natalie Savva	52.27	11-4	6
2nd	Top Touch	John Sherry	52.53	20-1	3
3rd	Westpark Kale	Phil Rees Sr.	52.59	1-1f	5
4th	Shakehands		53.15	40-1	2
5th	Gloss	Bette Godwin	53.18	16-1	4
6th	Langford Dacoit	George Curtis	53.24	3-1	1

Grand National, White City (April 8 500m h, £1,500)
Pos	Name of Greyhound	Trainer	SP	Time	Trap
1st	Topothetide	Tim Forster	8-11f	30.23	2
2nd	Raybet	Norah McEllistrim	12-1	30.47	6
3rd	Moreen Penguin	Bette Godwin	9-1	30.93	4
4th	Danger Freak	Tom Foster	14-1	31.01	5
5th	Moreen Flamingoe		7-2	31.09	3
6th	Ballyhar Aim		10-1	31.10	1

Scurry Gold Cup, Slough (April 15, 442m, £2,500)
Pos	Name of Greyhound	Trainer	SP	Time	Trap
1st	Greenfield Fox	Ted Dickson	5-2f	27.00	4
2nd	Northwood Double	Paddy McEvoy	4-1	27.02	3
3rd	Westmead Orchid	George Bailey	20-1	27.14	1
4th	Tiger Jazz	Terry Dartnall	7-2	27.26	2
5th	Lacca Champion	Pat Mullins	9-4f	27.46	5
6th	Vals Son		50-1	27.48	6

Laurels, Wimbledon (May 19, 460m, £3,000)
Pos	Name of Greyhound	Trainer	SP	Time	Trap
1st	Jet Control	Bertie Gaynor	9-2	27.45	2
2nd	Night Fall	Bertie Gaynor	11-4f	27.51	6
3rd	Pigeon Flyer	Tom Reilly	3-1	27.61	1
4th	Great Storytella	Norah McEllistrim	4-1	27.65	4
5th	Shady Monkey	Colin West	12-1	27.67	5
6th	Tiger Jazz	Terry Dartnall	4-1	27.83	3

Scottish Greyhound Derby, Shawfield (Aug 5, 500m, £2,500)
Pos	Name of Greyhound	Trainer	SP	Time	Trap
1st	Pat Seamur	Geoff De Mulder	11-4	30.52	2
2nd	Kentim Khan	Bertie Gaynor	3-1	30.60	5
3rd	Blissful Hero	Geoff De Mulder	5-4f	30.70	3
4th	Rum Please		5-1	30.90	1
5th	Erins Band		14-1	31.06	4

St Leger, Wembley (Sep 4, 655m, £10,000)
Pos	Name of Greyhound	Trainer	SP	Time	Trap
1st	Westmead Power	Natalie Savva	4-5f	39.67	2
2nd	Rhu	Matt O'Donnell	11-4	39.93	5
3rd	Nipa Lassie	Stan Gudgin	13-2	40.03	3
4th	Waveney Boy		40-1	40.15	6
5th	Tour Tess	Frank Baldwin	12-1	40.23	1
6th	Ascarne Bronco	Pat Mullins	10-1	40.69	4

Gold Collar, Catford (Sep 23, 555m, £2,000)
Pos	Name of Greyhound	Trainer	SP	Time	Trap
1st	Im A Smasher	John Coleman	7-1	35.31	6
2nd	Pat Seamur	Geoff De Mulder	3-1	35.45	3
3rd	Rockaway Star	Barney O'Connor	3-1	35.59	2
4th	Owners Guide	Tony Jowett	3-1	35.63	1
5th	Adamstown Sonny	Dave Geggus	11-4f	35.79	4
6th	El Cavalier	Ted Griffin	10-1	35.95	5

Ladbrokes Cesarewitch, Belle Vue (Oct 7, 815m, £2,000)
Pos	Name of Greyhound	Trainer	SP	Time	Trap
1st	Sportland Blue	Harry Crapper	7-2	51.20	3
2nd	Tour Tess	Frank Baldwin	8-1	51.21	1
3rd	Westown Adam	Natalie Savva	4-5f	51.35	6
4th	Micks Glory	Ron Saunders	14-1	51.51	4
5th	Corboy Kojak	Harry Bamford	10-1	51.54	2
6th	Peggys Darling	Miss.B.Gavin	3-1	51.94	5

The Grand Prix, Walthamstow (Oct 21, 640m, £5,000)
Pos	Name of Greyhound	Trainer	SP	Time	Trap
1st	Paradise Spectre	Pat Mullins	3-1cf	40.03	2
2nd	Toytown Sparkie	Gwen Lynds	14-1	40.27	6
3rd	Ruakuras Mutt	Paddy Coughlan	3-1cf	40.39	1
4th	Langford Dan		8-1	40.57	4
5th	Adamstown Sonny	Dave Geggus	3-1cf	40.58	3
6th	Ballinamona Prim	Brian Jay	9-2	00.00	5

Oaks, Harringay (Nov 3, 475m, £1,750)
Pos	Name of Greyhound	Trainer	SP	Time	Trap
1st	Kilmagoura Mist	Tom Johnston Jr.	10-1	28.55	4
2nd	House Party	Geoff De Mulder	1-2f	28.65	5
3rd	Westmead Orchid	George Bailey	5-1	28.71	1
4th	Dot the Domino	Dave Geggus	7-2	28.75	6
5th	Timeless	John Coleman	12-1	29.09	2
N/R	Shiloh Jenny	Ray Wilkes			

=== Principal Irish finals ===
Liam Cashman Laurels Cork (Sep 9, 525y, £5,500)
Pos	Name of Greyhound	Trainer	Time	Trap
1st	Knockrour Girl	Denis Lynch	29.40	5
2nd	Gay Corner	Duggan	29.61	2
3rd	Killaclug Jet	Denis Lynch	29.89	1
4th	Allemaine	Batt O'Keeffe	29.94	4
u	Shanaway Lad	Ger McKenna		3
u	Median Line	Ryan		6

Sean Kelly Bookmakers Oaks Shelbourne (Sep 16 525y, £5,500)
Pos	Name of Greyhound	Trainer	Time	Trap
1st	Hail Fun	McGeough	29.40	3
2nd	Tinnock Style	Travers	29.50	2
3rd	Oh Milady	Gay McKenna	29.60	6
4th	Sophronia	Manning		1
5th	Paddys Shandon	Barry		5
6th	Tain Gerty	Fortune		4

== Totalisator returns ==
Extended content

The totalisator returns declared to the licensing authorities for the year 1978 are listed below.

Stadium	Turnover £
London (White City)	7,516,329
London (Walthamstow)	6,698,105
London (Wimbledon)	5,499,899
London (Harringay)	3,921,877
Romford	3,279,645
London (Catford)	3,218,912
London (Wembley)	3,187,421
Brighton & Hove	2,635,330
Slough	2,603,149
Manchester (Belle Vue)	2,565,272
Birmingham (Hall Green)	2,278,397
Edinburgh (Powderhall)	2,083,876
Crayford & Bexleyheath	1,846,876
Birmingham (Perry Barr, old)	1,645,611
Southend-on-Sea	1,617,033

Stadium	Turnover £
Newcastle (Brough Park)	1,555,827
Leeds (Elland Road)	1,480,743
Sheffield (Owlerton)	1,453,632
Glasgow (Shawfield)	1,310,937
Wolverhampton (Monmore)	1,176,329
Bristol (Eastville)	1,104,259
Manchester (White City)	991,229
London (Hackney)	946,398
Gloucester & Cheltenham	906,462
Derby	870,547
Yarmouth	851,157
Newcastle (Gosforth)	802,030
Ramsgate (Dumpton Park)	669,845
Portsmouth	618,449
Rochester & Chatham	618,449

Stadium	Turnover £
Willenhall	604,875
Poole	498,953
Reading	458,276
Middlesbrough	443,152
Hull (Old Craven Park)	407,433
Milton Keynes	400,088
Leicester (Blackbird Rd)	332,625
Cradley Heath	298,762
Ipswich	292,998
Oxford	276,205
Swindon]	264,205
Rye House	254,346
Henlow (Bedfordshire)	248,273
Coventry	168,628
Norton Canes	120,000
