= 1974 UK & Ireland Greyhound Racing Year =

The 1974 UK & Ireland Greyhound Racing Year was the 49th year of greyhound racing in the United Kingdom and the 48th year of greyhound racing in Ireland.

== Roll of honour ==
Major Winners
Award	Name of Winner
1974 English Greyhound Derby	Jimsun
1974 Irish Greyhound Derby	Lively Band
1974 Scottish Greyhound Derby	Cosha Orchis
1974 Welsh Greyhound Derby	Dankie
Greyhound Trainer of the Year	John Coleman
Greyhound of the Year	Westpark Mustard
Irish Greyhound of the Year	Lively Band

== Summary ==
A black bitch called Westpark Mustard won the £300 Longcross Cup at White City in February at odds of 4–11, beating Heavy Sleeper and litter brother Westpark Onion by six lengths. It was the fifth successive victory by the bitch. She then completed ten wins in a row, when successful in the GRA stakes. The greyhound went on to record 15 successive victories before breaking into season on 12 May. Trained by Tom Johnston at Wembley she was homing in on Mick the Miller's record of 19. After seasonal rest her connections entered her for one off open races, deciding to avoid the Gold Collar and Cesarewitch. Five open race wins secured the new European record feat of 20 successive victories with the 20th win aptly named the Mick The Miller Record Stakes.

The annual National Greyhound Racing Club (NGRC) returns were released, with totalisator turnover at £63,950,885 and attendances recorded at 6,083,334.

Unbeknown to the industry the GRA Property Trust was on the verge of financial disaster due to the property slump, the company mismanagement continued with the securing of significant loans (Including £10 million from the ICI pension fund) in an attempt to maintain the share price, in addition to buying a 23% stake in the Coral Leisure Group, in the spring for £5.7 million.

== Tracks ==
The GRA closed Clapton Stadium on 1 January, the Scurry Gold Cup competition was subsequently moved Slough Stadium. Rayleigh Weir Stadium also closed on 8 March.

Ipswich joined the NRGC banner under a new permit scheme and held their first race on 2 February; the track was under the control of Ernie Wedon who was also responsible with Len Franklin for Yarmouth stadium being constructed in 1940. Other independent tracks to follow suit during the year were Halifax (owned by Jack Wardman and Owlerton director Mr J Carter), Rye House (an independent since 1960) and Cambridge. Norton Canes and Watford switched to NGRC rules in the latter part of the year to complete a group of six. The Watford track was on the inside of Watford FC's ground and was promoted by the GRA; it attracted Barbara Tompkins as a trainer and soon became a Bookmakers Afternoon Greyhound Service (BAGS). Ultimately the NGRC were disappointed that only six independents took advantage of the new licensing available. Cambridge reverted to an independent after just five months after promoter Laurie Boost claimed that the tracks costs had increased. Independent track Newton Abbott had their grand opening on 2 May, the track sited on the national hunt racecourse itself featured a grandstand that could be dismantled when horse racing takes place.

== News ==
Former Clapton Racing Manager Hugh Richardson became GRA's chief Racing Manager whilst trainers Adam Jackson and Tom Foster moved to White City. The closures of tracks forced trainers Kenric Appleton, Jim Sherry, Charlie Smoothy, Margaret Barker and Don Thornton into early retirement. However Thornton would join Maidstone two years later.

Two Wimbledon trainers retired, Paddy McEllistrim and Stan Martin, they were replaced by Paddy's daughter Norah and Sam Sykes a former head lad to Clare Orton. Owlerton's Ted Brennan also retired after 43-year career and was replaced by Harry Crapper. Further trainer changes saw David Kinchett join White City from Shawfield and Jim Cremin became an Assistant Racing Manager at Brighton under Peter Shotton. Tony Smith became Willenhall Racing Manager after moving from Leeds.

The Retired Greyhound Trust was formed with the task of finding homes for ex racers and Con Stevens resigned from the board of directors at Wimbledon bringing to an end his 46 years of association with the track.

Jim Layton became Racing Manager at Catford Stadium and Victor Chandler Sr. died leaving a 20% stake of Walthamstow Stadium to Victor Chandler Jr.

== Competitions ==
Patricias Hope failed in an attempt to become the first greyhound to win three English Greyhound Derby's. A greyhound called Volvo won the Mount Vernon Derby earning £450, a remarkable figure for an independent track. The year's major winners were overshadowed by the exploits of Westpark Mustard.

== Ireland ==
Dunmore and Celtic Park endured serious disruptions due to the troubles in Belfast. The National power was continuing in Britain and Ireland and many tracks were in crisis, the 1973 ban on floodlighting continued into 1974 and many tracks had to purchase a generator. Derry in Northern Ireland came closest to closing after being unable to maintain racing in the afternoon.

After travelling to Shelbourne Park, Westpark Mustard's run of 20 wins was ended when beaten by Tommy Astaire.

== Principal UK races ==
Grand National, White City (April 13 525y h, £750)
Pos	Name of Greyhound	Trainer	SP	Time	Trap
1st	Shanneys Darkie	Colin West	10-1	29.43	4
2nd	Andreda		11-2	29.75	3
3rd	Silver Breeze		14-1	30.07	6
4th	Heath Grange	Charlie Coyle	6-4f	30.43	1
5th	Strebor Gem	David Kinchett	9-2	30.71	2
6th	Sammic Blue	Noreen Collin	3-1	30.91	5

Laurels, Wimbledon (May 17, 500y, £3,000)
Pos	Name of Greyhound	Trainer	SP	Time	Trap
1st	Over Protected	John Coleman	7-4	28.00	4
2nd	Deneholme Chief	Norah McEllistrim	6-1	28.08	5
3rd	Slippery Slave	Colin West	10-1	28.14	3
4th	Ahaveen Dandy	Pat Casey	4-1	28.17	1
5th	Huberts Cato		16-1	28.25	6
6th	Handy High	Paddy Milligan	6-4f	28.39	2

The Grand Prix, Walthamstow (May 25, 700y, £1,500)
Pos	Name of Greyhound	Trainer	SP	Time	Trap
1st	Ballyglass Hope	Don Thornton	7-1	40.58	4
2nd	King David	George Curtis	4-1	40.70	1
3rd	Chain Gang	Frank Melville	6-1	40.86	5
4th	Leading Pride	George Curtis	7-4f	40.87	2
5th	Silver Sceptre	Reg Young	9-2	40.89	6
6th	Rally Round	Frank Melville	10-1	41.01	3

Welsh Derby, Arms Park (Jul 13, 525y £1,000)
Pos	Name of Greyhound	Trainer	SP	Time	Trap
1st	Dankie	Colin West	4-1	29.72	6
2nd	Black Banjo	Barney O'Connor	8-1	29.96	5
3rd	Soft Light	Joe Bennett	5-4f	29.97	4
4th	Silver Thought		10-1	30.51	2
5th	Sibbens	Frank Baldwin	9-4	30.53	1
6th	Cowboy Jo	Mick Hawkins	12-1	30.61	3

Skol Scottish Derby, Shawfield (Aug 3, 525y, £2,000)
Pos	Name of Greyhound	Trainer	SP	Time	Trap
1st	Cosha Orchis	Jimmy Meechan	12-1	29.20	5
2nd	Sibbens	Frank Baldwin	5-1	29.44	3
3rd	Two P.M	Norman Oliver	5-2f	29.48	6
4th	Ahaveen Dandy	Pat Casey	3-1	29.54	1
5th	Cheerful Bill	J Doyle	9-2	29.60	4
6th	Bealkilla Diver	Jim Glass	3-1	30.00	2

St Leger, Wembley (Sep 2, 700y, £2,500)
Pos	Name of Greyhound	Trainer	SP	Time	Trap
1st	Cute Caddie	David Kinchett	4-1	41.17	2
2nd	Blackwater Champ	Peter Payne	6-4f	41.23	6
3rd	Black Banjo	Barney O'Connor	6-1	41.33	3
4th	Streaky Sheila	Charlie Coyle	3-1	41.35	5
5th	Annettes Diamond	John Coleman	9-2	41.41	1
6th	Michaels Duchess		10-1	41.97	4

Scurry Gold Cup, Slough (Sep 7, 475y £1,000)
Pos	Name of Greyhound	Trainer	SP	Time	Trap
1st	Westmead Valley	Hugh McEntyre	11-10f	26.24	6
2nd	Sweetly		8-1	26.62	5
3rd	Mahon Valley	Colin West	5-1	27.18	2
4th	Tipper Tar		16-1	27.24	3
5th	Parazoo	Mrs.J.Hawkins	9-2	27.34	4
6th	Solar Mars	Sam Ray	9-2	27.44	1

Gold Collar, Catford (Sep 21, 610y, £2,000)
Pos	Name of Greyhound	Trainer	SP	Time	Trap
1st	Leaders Champion	Dave Geggus	8-11f	35.02	1
2nd	Gay Kathy	Tom Johnston Jr.	6-1	35.60	4
3rd	Merry Champion	Luckhurst	3-1	36.06	3
4th	Ballytegan	Ken Usher	6-1	36.12	6
5th	Breakaway Steve		25-1	36.34	5
6th	Millcock	Peter Payne	7-1	36.60	2

Cesarewitch, Belle Vue (Sep 28, 880y, £2,000)
Pos	Name of Greyhound	Trainer	SP	Time	Trap
1st	Westbrook Quinn	John Coulter	7-2	52.17	5
2nd	Pitmans Brief	Jim Singleton	7-4f	52.31	4
3rd	Silver Sceptre	Reg Young	4-1	52.39	2
4th	Chain Gang	Frank Melville	2-1	52.49	3
5th	Kiwis Buster	D Exley	10-1	52.71	1
N/R	Lizzies Girl	E.Williams			6

Oaks, Harringay (Nov 8, 525y, £1,500)
Pos	Name of Greyhound	Trainer	SP	Time	Trap
1st	Lady Devine	Sid Ryall	3-1	28.76	5
2nd	Gay Kathy	Tom Johnston Jr.	4-1	28.94	1
3rd	Bo Bo's Jane		8-1	29.26	2
4th	Pineapple Grand	Frank Baldwin	1-1f	29.34	3
5th	Sweeping View		50-1	29.54	6
6th	Ballinderry Lass	Clare Orton	16-1	29.66	4

BBC TV Trophy, White City (Nov 20, 880y, £1,000)
Pos	Name of Greyhound	Trainer	SP	Time	Trap
1st	Stage Box	Natalie Savva	51.75	16-1	4
2nd	Streaky Sheila	Charlie Coyle	51.91	4-7f	1
3rd	Silver Sceptre	Reg Young	51.99	12-1	3
4th	Pitmans Brief	Jim Singleton	52.43	7-2	2
5th	Gay Knight	Norman Oliver	52.47	16-1	6
6th	Harmless Gossip		52.71	16-1	5

== Totalisator returns ==
Extended content

The totalisator returns declared to the licensing authorities for the year 1974 are listed below.

Stadium	Turnover £
London (White City)	7,509,284
London (Walthamstow)	5,957,636
London (Wimbledon)	4,914,878
London (Harringay)	4,398,843
London (Catford)	3,159,847
London (Wembley)	2,900,581
Romford	2,221,780
Manchester (Belle Vue)	2,356,127
Brighton & Hove	1,918,806
Edinburgh (Powderhall)	1,903,889
Birmingham (Perry Barr, old)	1,903,161
Crayford & Bexleyheath	1,544,869
Glasgow (Shawfield)	1,476,621
Birmingham (Hall Green)	1,458,788
Southend-on-Sea	1,371,804

Stadium	Turnover £
Newcastle (Brough Park)	1,341,640
Slough	1,336,330
Leeds (Elland Road)	1,264,409
Sheffield (Owlerton)	1,202,636
London (Hackney)	1,116,943
Bristol (Eastville)	957,041
Manchester (White City)	934,147
Wolverhampton (Monmore)	930,048
Gloucester & Cheltenham	894,448
Cardiff (Arms Park)	758,377
Rochester & Chatham	730,422
Manchester (Salford)	708,763
Newcastle (Gosforth)	698,706
Derby	666,492
Willenhall	591,226

Stadium	Turnover £
Oxford	585,823
Poole	511,236
Portsmouth	490,234
Ramsgate (Dumpton Park)	426,285
Cradley Heath	381,572
Hull (Old Craven Park)	328,724
Middlesbrough	317,448
Leicester (Blackbird Rd)	266,733
Swindon	260,046
Ipswich	249,389
Preston	193,721
Milton Keynes	179,433
Rye House	109,102
London (Watford)	86,703
