= 1975 UK & Ireland Greyhound Racing Year =

The 1975 UK & Ireland Greyhound Racing Year was the 50th year of greyhound racing in the United Kingdom and the 49th year of greyhound racing in Ireland.

== Roll of honour ==
Major Winners
Award	Name of Winner
1975 English Greyhound Derby	Tartan Khan
1975 Irish Greyhound Derby	Shifting Shadow
1975 Scottish Greyhound Derby	Dromlara Master
1975 Welsh Greyhound Derby	Baffling Bart
Greyhound Trainer of the Year	Paddy Milligan
Greyhound of the Year	Pineapple Grand
Irish Greyhound of the Year	Ballybeg Prim

== Summary ==
The National Greyhound Racing Club officially went metric from 1 January, which would mean all races being measured over metres instead of yards. The Irish authorities decided not to adopt the new system. The annual (NGRC) returns were released, with totalisator turnover at £69,220,977 and attendances recorded at 6,200,118, representing an increase in both.

Pineapple Grand, a fawn bitch trained by Frank Baldwin was voted Greyhound of the Year after winning the Wembley Spring Cup, Laurels at Wimbledon Stadium and Oaks at Harringay Stadium. Tartan Khan was unlucky not to get the vote after winning the 1975 English Greyhound Derby and the St Leger at Wembley.

The GRA Property Trust shares were suspended as it was revealed that the company had debts near to £20 million. The future of the company looked bleak.

== Tracks ==
Allied presentations re-opened a new Reading track at Bennett Road, just over one year after the Greyhound Racing Association had closed the venue at Oxford Road. The new venue was built by owner trainer Bill Dore. Three independent tracks also opened at the Loomer Road Stadium in Chesterton at the Horton Road Stadium and at the Queens Park Football Ground (Bedford). Yarmouth Stadium made their debut under NGRC rules by virtue of the permit scheme.

Oxford Stadium Managing Director Ian Stevens (son of Con Stevens), acting for Bristol Stadium Ltd, sold Oxford to the City Council housing committee for £235,000 in October. A 27,000 strong petition was lodged with the local authorities and Tory MP Michael Heseltine called for a public meeting with a deadline set to find a new buyer. Shawfield Stadium suffered a devastating fire, destroying most of the facilities. Hull Kingston Rovers bought the Craven Park stadium back from the owners; they had previously sold it in 1938.

== News ==
Brighton trainer Fred Lugg retired and was replaced by Doreen Walsh, the head kennelhand to George Curtis. Tom Baldwin died aged 77 and John Sherry gained a position as a trainer at Walthamstow Stadium after serving his apprenticeship at the kennels of Wembley trainer Tom Johnston.

Drynham Star broke the Derby Stadium track record over 590 metres in a re-run, despite already having run to the third bend before the hare broke down. Ramsgate trainer Peter Rich, former head man to John Coleman won all eight races at one meeting at his home track producing a 428,793-1 accumulator.

== Competitions ==
Harringay introduced the Golden Jacket, a new event for stayers.

== Ireland ==
Peruvian Style, a light brindle 1973 whelp owned by Deirdre Hynes and trained by Tony Fahy had been beaten in the 1,000 Guineas final by Lively Band at Dundalk. Following this he went on to win the Tipperary Cup, made the semi-finals of the Laurels, won the Harp Lager Stakes at Dundalk and the Waterford Glass Stakes breaking the track record. Twelve consecutive wins were achieved after a Shelbourne Park event win before a winter rest.

The Ger McKenna trained Ballybeg Prim was voted Irish Greyhound of the Year after winning the Irish Cesarewitch, Irish St Leger and the Shelbourne 600.

== Principal UK races ==
Grand National, White City (April 12 500m h, £1,250)
Pos	Name of Greyhound	Trainer	SP	Time	Trap
1st	Pier Hero	Frank Melville	1-1f	30.65	1
2nd	Weston Pete	Colin West	5-1	30.81	4
3rd	Tawny Black		16-1	30.82	5
4th	Bachelor Rose		10-1	30.86	3
5th	Try It Blackie	Frank Melville	5-1	31.04	6
6th	Killoneford Dash		5-1	31.18	2

Scurry Gold Cup, Slough (April 15, 434m, £1,500)
Pos	Name of Greyhound	Trainer	SP	Time	Trap
1st	Longnor Lad	Ben Parsons	4-1	26.77	5
2nd	Clear Reason	Mrs Dorin Clark	5-4f	27.21	2
3rd	Grange Tim	George Curtis	4-1	27.29	6
4th	Monsoon Boy		5-1	27.57	1
5th	Deire Na Fienna	Terry Duggan	20-1	27.81	4
6th	Star Vega	Mrs.J.Hawkins	7-1	27.83	3

BBC TV Trophy, Monmore (April 23, 815m, £1,000)
Pos	Name of Greyhound	Trainer	SP	Time	Trap
1st	Lizzies Girl	Ted Williams	7-4jf	52.16+	6
2nd	Silver Lipstick	Rowe	4-1	52.19	3
3rd	Mcarthur Pride	Tom Chamberlain	14-1	52.37	1
4th	Captain Saul	Gwen Lynds	20-1	52.53	5
5th	Monavale	Belle Vue	25-1	52.65	4
6th	Chain Gang	Frank Melville	7-4jf	52.71	2

+Track Record

Laurels, Wimbledon (May 16, 460m, £3,000)
Pos	Name of Greyhound	Trainer	SP	Time	Trap
1st	Pineapple Grand	Frank Baldwin	3-1	27.77	1
2nd	Flip Your Top	Bob Young	11-4	27.83	3
3rd	Bealkilla Diver	Pat Mullins	9-1	27.93	2
4th	Hillside Kuda	Sam Sykes	10-1	27.94	6
5th	Slender Lead		9-1	28.08	5
6th	Tory Mor	Paddy Milligan	5-2	28.16	4

Welsh Derby, Arms Park (Jul 12, 484m £1,200)
Pos	Name of Greyhound	Trainer	SP	Time	Trap
1st	Baffling Bart	Paddy Milligan	3-1	29.37	3
2nd	Clatra Glee	Andy Agnew	12-1	29.89	6
3rd	Greenane Spy	M.Hickey	6-1	30.07	4
4th	Domlara Master	Bertie Gaynor	5-1	30.25	5
5th	Main Avenue		11-4	30.28	2
6th	That Silver	John Coleman	3-1	30.50	1

Scottish Greyhound Derby, Shawfield (Aug 16, 485m, £2,500)
Pos	Name of Greyhound	Trainer	SP	Time	Trap
1st	Dromlara Master	Bertie Gaynor	7-1	29.30	2
2nd	Macbeth		4-1	29.42	4
3rd	Tory Mor	Paddy Milligan	6-4f	29.58	5
4th	Garford Joe		6-1	29.74	6
5th	Kind Effort	Pat Casey	20-1	29.80	3
6th	Foreign Exchange	Paddy Milligan	5-2	29.96	1

St Leger, Wembley (Sep 1, 655m, £2,500)
Pos	Name of Greyhound	Trainer	SP	Time	Trap
1st	Tartan Khan	Gwen Lynds	7-2	39.45+	3
2nd	Sandispec	Clare Orton	13-8f	39.51	2
3rd	Countville	Natalie Savva	25-1	39.71	6
4th	Dancing Dolores	Paddy Reilly	5-2	39.77	1
5th	Flashy Snoopy	Frank Baldwin	16-1	39.99	5
6th	Drynham Star	Natalie Savva	5-1	40.15	4

+Track Record

Gold Collar, Catford (Sep 20, 555m, £2,000)
Pos	Name of Greyhound	Trainer	SP	Time	Trap
1st	Abbey Glade	George Curtis	11-4	34.97	4
2nd	Dancing Dolores	Paddy Reilly	3-1	35.55	5
3rd	Foreign Exchange	Paddy Milligan	9-4f	35.56	1
4th	Westmead Land	Natalie Savva	20-1	35.62	6
5th	Mad Quest	Colin West	14-1	35.78	3
6th	Adioss	Adam Jackson	7-2	35.82	2

Cesarewitch, Belle Vue (Sep 27, 815m, £2,000)
Pos	Name of Greyhound	Trainer	SP	Time	Trap
1st	Silver Sceptre	Reg Young	4-1	52.31	4
2nd	Bonzo	George Curtis	7-1	52.35	3
3rd	Babe Monalee	Dave Geggus	9-2	52.39	2
4th	Favourite Animal	Harry Bamford	5-1	52.93	6
5th	Major Hope	Frank Melville	5-1	53.07	1
6th	Joys Image	Ted Parker	5-2f	53.29	5

Oaks, Harringay (Nov 7, 480m, £1,500)
Pos	Name of Greyhound	Trainer	SP	Time	Trap
1st	Pineapple Grand	Frank Baldwin	8-11f	28.85	4
2nd	Tory Mor	Paddy Milligan	7-2	28.89	6
3rd	Stylish Kilbeg	Paddy Milligan	4-1	29.01	3
4th	Fairland Flash	Gordon Bailey	25-1	29.11	2
5th	Gay Kathy	Tom Johnston Jr.	10-1	29.19	1
6th	Indiana Blues		66-1	29.41	5

== Totalisator returns ==
Extended content

The totalisator returns declared to the licensing authorities for the year 1975 are listed below.

Stadium	Turnover £
London (White City)	7,659,552
London (Walthamstow)	6,046,355
London (Wimbledon)	4,910,587
London (Harringay)	4,119,519
London (Catford)	3,195,352
London (Wembley)	2,861,233
Romford	2,833,215
Manchester (Belle Vue)	2,334,210
Edinburgh (Powderhall)	2,109,465
Brighton & Hove	2,035,327
Birmingham (Perry Barr, old)	1,999,703
Slough	1,902,342
Birmingham (Hall Green)	1,782,587
Southend-on-Sea	1,652,727
Crayford & Bexleyheath	1,610,532
Newcastle (Brough Park)	1,502,681

Stadium	Turnover £
Glasgow (Shawfield)	1,501,432
Sheffield (Owlerton)	1,412,133
Leeds (Elland Road)	1,362,053
Wolverhampton (Monmore)	1,123,854
Manchester (White City)	1,103,005
Bristol (Eastville)	1,055,765
London (Hackney)	1,031,109
Rochester & Chatham	883,890
Gloucester & Cheltenham	836,379
Derby	824,637
Cardiff (Arms Park)	811,009
Yarmouth	762,759
Newcastle (Gosforth)	728,586
Manchester (Salford)	672,347
Willenhall	655,725
Oxford	568,513

Stadium	Turnover £
Portsmouth	558,274
Poole	527,652
Ramsgate (Dumpton Park)	522,486
Cradley Heath	411,118
Hull (Old Craven Park)	408,221
Middlesbrough	385,966
Milton Keynes	369,406
Leicester (Blackbird Rd)	310,718
London (Watford)	299,535
Swindon	278,524
Ipswich	246,000
Preston	239,815
Reading	235,698
Rye House	234,182
Norton Canes	216,046
Halifax	78,878
