= 1974 English Greyhound Derby =

- Location: White City Stadium
- Start date: 15 June
- End date: 29 June
- Total prize money: £13,500 (winner)

The 1974 Spillers Greyhound Derby took place during June with the final being held on 29 June 1974 at White City Stadium. The winner was Jimsun and the winning owners Joe De Mulder and Miss Lesley Walker received £13,500. The competition was sponsored by the Spillers.

== Final result ==
At White City (over 525 yards):

Position	Name of Greyhound	Breeding	Trap	SP	Time	Trainer
1st	Jimsun	Monalee Champion - Lady Expert	1	5-2	28.76	Geoff De Mulder (Hall Green)
2nd	Myrtown	Myross Again - Longstown Lassie	3	2-1	28.86	Eddie Moore (White City - Manchester)
3rd	Ballymaclune	Yanka Boy - Kitty True	6	5-1	28.90	Ger McKenna (Ireland)
4th	Soft Light	The Grand Light - Knockmoylan Kate	4	6-1	28.92	Joe Bennett (Private)
5th	Blackwater Champ	Monalee Champion - Athnid	5	13-8f	29.00	Peter Payne (Private)
6th	Handy High	Handy Valley - Black Highbird	2	20-1	29.20	Paddy Milligan (Private)

=== Distances ===
1¼, ½, head, 1, 2½ (lengths)
The distances between the greyhounds are in finishing order and shown in lengths. One length is equal to 0.08 of one second.

== Competition Report ==
Patricias Hope returned for an attempt to win an unprecedented third Derby but he was up against the ante-post favourites that included Juvenile and Wood Lane winner Myrtown, Irish entries Ballymaclune and Lively Band and Laurels victors Black Banjo and Over Protected.

Black Banjo failed to progress from round one but Blackwater Champ, (the Pall Mall Stakes champion) and Jimsun recorded the best times of 28.53 & 28.54 respectively. In a very strong heat two of round two the dream of Patricias Hope ended with his connections retiring him with immediate effect. Myrtown, Jimsun, Blackwater Champ and Acomb Dot all won their heats and remained unbeaten.

The first semi-final saw Soft Light provide a shock when beating Jimsun by a length whilst Acomb Dot finished last. Blackwater Champ took heat two with Myrtown taking the third and the final qualifying place.

A crowd of 33,000 turned up to see the sports premier race and they watched the Irish hope Ballymaclune trap well and take an early lead. Favourite Blackwater Champ lost any chance after missing the break. Jimsun showed good early pace to overtake and impede Handy High when moving up to second place and then challenged along the back straight before going onto win by just over a length in 28.76sec. Myrtown finished well to take second place.

== Quarter finals ==
Heat 1
Pos	Name	SP	Time
1st	Acomb Dot	9-4	28.68
2nd	Lively Band	5-4f	28.71
3rd	Ballymaclune	7-1	28.95
4th	Economy Size	25-1	29.13
5th	Deise Dreams	4-1	29.37
6th	Greenane Bard	50-1	29.47

Heat 2
Pos	Name	SP	Time
1st	Myrtown	4-6f	28.67
2nd	Soft Light	7-1	28.81
3rd	Silver Thought	40-1	28.84
4th	Spiral Cindy	6-1	28.96
5th	Patricias Hope	14-1	28.98
6th	Coin Case	4-1	29.12

Heat 3
Pos	Name	SP	Time
1st	Jimsun	4-7f	28.69
2nd	Benson Cash	20-1	29.07
3rd	Houghton Hiker	50-1	29.10
4th	Two P.M.	8-1	29.11
5th	Pass Me Not	9-1	29.37
6th	Over Protected	3-1	29.47

Heat 4
Pos	Name	SP	Time
1st	Blackwater Champ	1-2f	28.61
2nd	Monsoon Boy	25-1	28.83
3rd	Handy High	10-1	29.07
4th	Jingle Jockey	40-1	29.09
5th	Crown Walter	4-1	29.17
6th	Emerald Storm	9-1	29.41

== Semi finals ==
First Semi Final
Pos	Name of Greyhound	SP	Time	Trainer
1st	Soft Light	7-1	28.75	Bennett
2nd	Jimsun	4-7f	28.83	De Mulder
3rd	Ballymaclune	8-1	28.85	McKenna
4th	Benson Cash	50-1	28.95	West
5th	Monsoon Boy	16-1	28.99	Conroy
6th	Acomb Dot	5-1	29.19	Malcolm

Second Semi Final
Pos	Name of Greyhound	SP	Time	Trainer
1st	Blackwater Champ	7-4	28.95	Payne
2nd	Handy High	40-1	29.19	Milligan
3rd	Myrtown	11-10f	29.59	Moore
4th	Lively Band	9-2	29.67	Johnston
5th	Houghton Hiker	66-1	29.75	
6th	Silver Thought	40-1	29.81	

== See also ==
- 1974 UK & Ireland Greyhound Racing Year
