= William Gentle =

Sir William Benjamin Gentle
- Born: 8 September 1865; Ashwell, Hertfordshire, England
- Died: 2 September 1948 (aged 83); Thetford, England
- Occupations: High Sheriff of Norfolk co-founder of the Greyhound Racing Association
- Spouse: Elizabeth Steward
- Children: Frederick Gentle; Francis Gentle

Sir William Benjamin Gentle (8 September 1865 – 2 September 1948) was an English police officer known for his work in fighting racecourse crime and was jointly responsible for promoting greyhound racing in the United Kingdom. He was Chief constable of Brighton from 1901 to 1920.

== Early life ==
Gentle was born in Ashwell, Hertfordshire in 1865 and was educated at Merchant Taylor's School. He entered the Ordnance Survey in 1882, aged 17. One year later he went to South Africa and served in the Cape Mounted Rifles for three years. When he returned to England in 1887 he joined the Metropolitan Police.

== Career ==
Ten years later he moved to Reading and became Chief Constable of Brighton in 1901. He held the post for 19 years and became well known for his work in combating race course gangs. He was knighted Sir William Gentle for his work in 1916. He was Colonel of the Sussex Yeomanry Cadet Corps and was staff assistant commissioner of the St. John Ambulance Brigade. He received Queen Victoria and King George V. police medals and the Jubilee medal.

He retired to Thetford in Norfolk, where he was several times mayor and in 1938 was High Sheriff of Norfolk. During his retirement he worked alongside Brigadier-General Alfred Critchley to form the Greyhound Racing Association (GRA), which introduced greyhound racing to the United Kingdom. He was the first chairman of the Greyhound Racing Association. Despite promoting greyhound racing; Gentle was alleged to have never made or a bet or owned a greyhound himself.

Gentle was chairman and director of the Belle Vue Zoo in Manchester that featured circus animals. He was active in the RSPCA in the 1920s, became a council member of the RSPCA in June 1931 and was president of the East Coast Branch. Lady Cory resigned from the RSPCA council in June 1931 in protest of Gentle's membership. She complained that Gentle was chairman of the Belle Vue Zoo and campaigned for his resignation.

== Family ==
Gentle was married and had two sons. His wife died in 1941. His son Francis S 'Frank' Gentle was also a director of the GRA and went on to manage the GRA's Harringay Stadium.

He died in Thetford in 1948 leaving an estate valued at £460,950.
