= 1975 English Greyhound Derby =

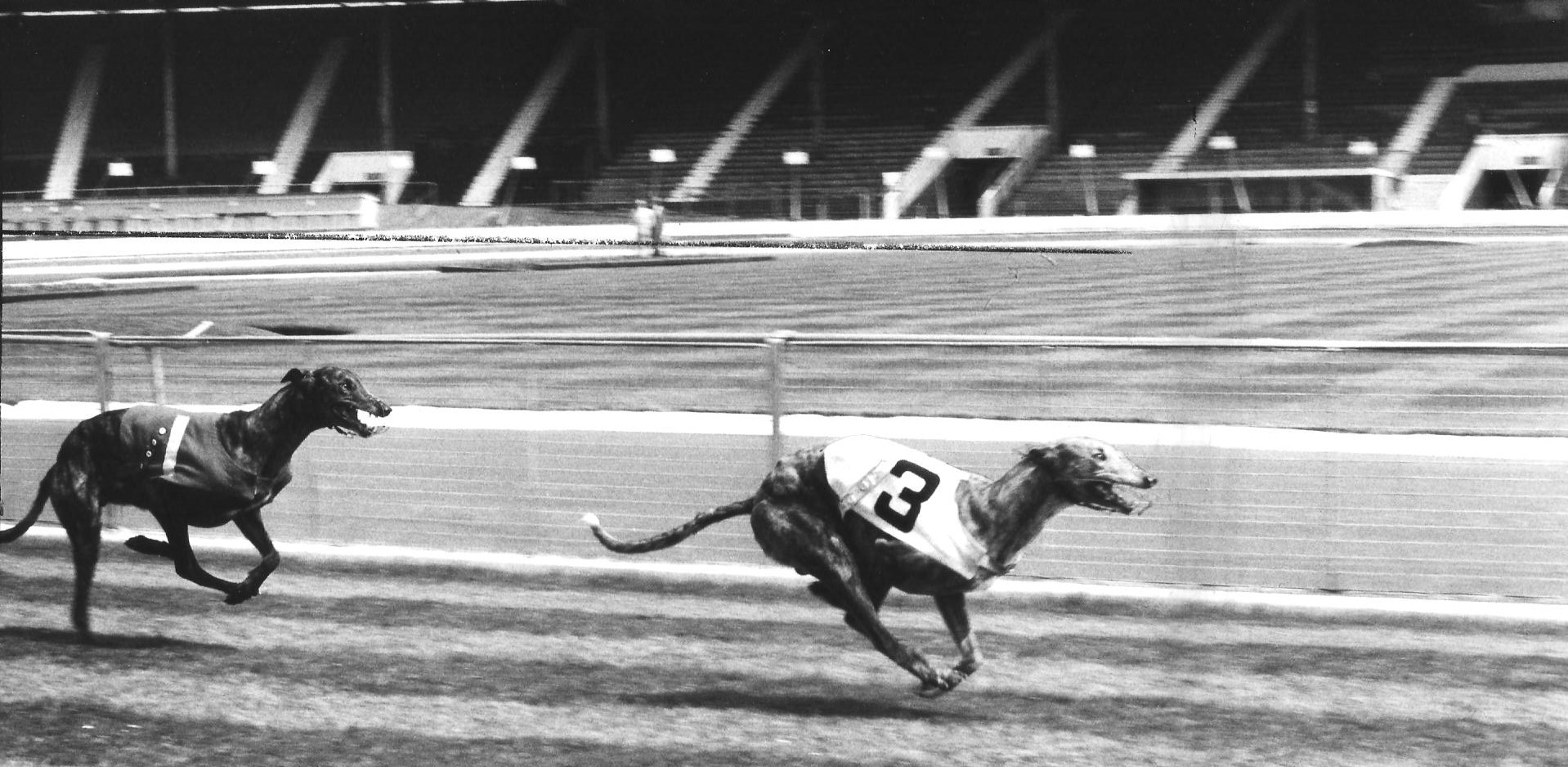
- Seamus Shane beats Myrtown in a qualifying
- Location: White City Stadium
- Start date: 14 June
- End date: 28 June
- Total prize money: £15,000 (winner)

The 1975 Spillers Greyhound Derby took place during June with the final being held on 28 June 1975 at White City Stadium. The winner was Tartan Khan and the winning owner Derek Law received £15,000. The competition was sponsored by the Spillers.

== Competition report ==
Ante-post favourites for the 1975 running of the Derby included Pineapple Grand and Myrtown. Ireland was well represented by Irish Greyhound Derby champion Lively Band and Shamrock Point.

A new metric distance of 500 metres saw new best times recorded by first round winners Shamrock Point (29.46) and Myrtown (29.43). The second round produced a new track record mark when Sallys Cobbler pipped Foreign Exchange and Shamrock Point in a time of 29.31. Outsider Slippery Slave then went five spots better in a later second round heat when defeating Lively Band. The only market leader to be eliminated was 'That Silver' who had been second in ante-post lists.

Myrtown won the first semi-final in yet another best time of 29.23 from Pineapple Grand and Tartan Khan. The second semi-final ended dramatically when around the last bend Lively Band swerved towards Shamrock Point and forced him near the hare rail. Sallys Cobbler and Foreign Exchange slipped through to take the first two places with Lively Band finishing third before being disqualified for fighting+. The rules (changed since the 1968 incident) meant that Lively Band would not be replaced by Shamrock Point in the final. Instead only a five-runner race would ensue.

In the final Sallys Cobbler led Tartan Khan to the first bend before moving off, 25-1 shot Tartan Khan then challenged until taking a decisive third bend lead. Tartan Khans owner Derek Law was a permit trainer Law and had placed his greyhound with trainer Gwen Lynds for the competition because he was not allowed to train for the Derby under permit rules.

+ Deliberate interference with other greyhounds in running.

== Final result ==
At White City (over 500 metres):

Position	Name of Greyhound	Breeding	Trap	SP	Time	Trainer
1st	Tartan Khan	Spectre II - Chilled Sweet	2	25-1	29.57	Gwen Lynds (Bletchley)
2nd	Sallys Cobbler	Cobbler - Pineapple Jam	1	3-1	29.67	John Bassett (Private)
3rd	Pineapple Grand	The Grand Silver - Pineapple Baby	6	4-1	29.75	Frank Baldwin (Perry Barr)
4th	Myrtown	Myross Again - Longstown Lassie	3	10-11f	29.89	Eddie Moore (White City - Manchester)
5th	Foreign Exchange	Silver Record - Coolagorna Again	5	10-1	29.89	Paddy Milligan (Private)
N/R	Lively Band	Silver Hope - Kell's Queen				Jack Murphy (Ireland)

=== Distances ===
1¼, 1, 1¾, 1¼ (lengths)

== See also ==
- 1975 UK & Ireland Greyhound Racing Year
