= Midland Flat =

- Class: Category 2
- Location: Hall Green Stadium
- Inaugurated: 1946
- Final run: 2006

Race information
- Distance: 474 metres
- Surface: Sand

The Midland Flat was a major greyhound racing competition held at Hall Green Stadium.

The race was inaugurated during the early 1930s and was seen as one of the principal events in the Midlands.

== Post War winners ==
Year	Winner	Breeding	Trainer	Time	SP	SP
1946	Negros Lad		Jack Toseland (Perry Barr)	28.75	4-7f	
1947	Just Killeedy		Mayor Baker (Wolverhampton)	28.83	2-1f	
1948	Circular Flex		William Mills (Private)	29.00	7-2	
1949	Behattan Marquis	Countryman - Behattan	Bob Burls (Wembley)	28.50	5-4f	
1950	Perfect Peter II		Mayor Baker (Wolverhampton)	28.58	5-4f	
1951	Rushton Smutty	Mad Tanist - Summer Frock	Frank Johnson (Private)	28.04	4-7f	Track record
1952	Drumman Rambler	Selyom – Shaggy Miss	Olly Chetland (Coventry)	28.51	8-11f	
1953	Marsh Harrier	Mad Tanist – Misty	Paddy McEvoy (Private)	28.24	4-9f	
1954	Demon King	Imperial Dancer – Pretty Waltzer	Jack Harvey (Wembley)	28.18	100-8	
1955	Baytown Dagger	Bahs Choice – Baytown Iris	Austin Hiscock (Belle Vue)	28.44	1-1f	
1956	Silver Chief	The Grand Champion – Never Fallen	Joe Booth (Private)	28.22	4-1	
1957	Ballypatrick	The Grand Champion – D West	Cyril Beaumont (Belle Vue)	28.28	11-10f	
1958	Colonel Perry	Olly's Square Rebel – Ashgrove Breeze	John Bassett (Private)	28.28	2-1	
1959	Killahalla	Ballymac Ball – Killahalla Grace	Len Bane (Kings Heath)	28.44	10-11f	
1960	Coradun	Solar Prince – Lemon Spot	W Holland (White City, Manchester)	28.78	5-1	
1961	Faithful Charlie	Glittering Look – Lady Artic	Jim Irving (Private)	27.88	10-11f	
1962	Happy Sailor	Knockrour Again – Peaceful Dancer	Norman Oliver (Brough Park)	28.07	6-1	
1963	Home Soon	The Grand Fire – Loughlass Maid	Norman Oliver (Brough Park)	28.23	10-1	
1964	Im Crazy	Crazy Parachute – Misfortune	Jim Irving (Private)	28.13	5-1	
1965	Kilbeg Kuda	Knockrour Again - Bermudas Glory	John Bassett (Private)	28.30	4-7f	
1966	Hammondstown Pat		Cliff Ogden (Hall Green)	28.15	5-1	
1967	Greenane Token	Prairie Flash – Olives Bonny	George Gooch (Preston)	28.40	7-1	
1968	Malaria	Greenane Wonder - Brisla	Pat Murphy (Derby)	28.21	1-1f	
1969	That Cailin	Dromin Glory – That Lady	Ray Wilkes (Hall Green)	28.24	7-4	
1970	Kilronane Jet	Tonrine – Jet Hostess	Tom Johnston Jr. (Wembley)	28.00	2-1	
1971	Cash For Gary	Movelaong Santa – Cash For Carrick	Ben Parsons (Kings Heath)	27.93	3-1c/f	
1972	Short Cake	The Grand Silver – She Is Landing	Sid Ryall (Private)	27.50	1-1f	
1973	Casa Miel	Kilbelin Style – Ballygill Piper	Joe Pickering (White City)	27.76	6-1	
1974	Lady Devine	Supreme Fun - Funny Flash	Sid Ryall (Wembley)	28.76	4-5f	
1975	Sun Chariot	Kilbeg Kuda – Rock’s Violet	Frank Melville (Harringay)	28.87	25-1	
1976	Westmead Border	Always Proud – Cricket Dance	Natalie Savva (Private)	29.22	8-1	
1977	Shiloh Jenny	Sole Aim – Shiloh Hope	Ray Wilkes (Hall Green)	28.64	8-1	
1978	Shiloh Jenny	Sole Aim – Shiloh Hope	Ray Wilkes (Hall Green)	28.83	2-1f	
1979	Loughlass Champ	Itsachampion – Final Score	Emil Kovac (Private)	29.04	6-1	
1980	Creamery Pat	Monalee Hiker – Young Speech	Ron Chamberlain (Private)	28.97	7-2	
1981	Houghton Sinbad	Shamrock Sailor – Thankyou Ken	Barbara Tompkins (Coventry)	29.05	5-2	
1982	Rikasso Hiker	Glenore Hiker – Lady Myrtown	Theo Mentzis (Milton Keynes)	28.97	10-1	
1983	Beau Geste	Desert Pilot – Faypoint Flyer	Leo Pugh (Hall Green)	29.02	5-1	
1984	Golden Sand	Desert Pilot – Sarahs Bunny	Geoff De Mulder (Private)	28.91	4-1	
1985	Hi There Linda	Lindas Champion – Lead More	Edna Wearing (Harringay)	29.08	1-1f	
1986	Leading Part	Rhincrew Rover – Leading Blonde	Paddy Hancox (Hall Green)	29.00	5-2	
1987	Ramtogue Dasher	Lauragh Six – Ramtogue Witch	Geoff De Mulder (Oxford)	28.80	13-8f	
1988	Parkers Brocade	Brief Candle – Parkers Morning	Bertie Gaynor (Hall Green)	29.28	4-1	
1989	Claddagh Heights	Rushwee Heights – Eightys Lady	Paddy Hancox (Hall Green)	30.31	2-1	
1990	Slaneyside Holly	Lodge Prince – Prince of Rocks	Trevor Cobbold (Private)	29.21	7-2	
1991	Awbeg Ball	Game Ball - Teeavan	Norah McEllistrim (Wimbledon)	29.47	8-11f	
1992	Winsor Vic	Dukes Lodge – Winsor Aird	John McGee Sr. (Private)	28.61	9-2	
1993	Just Right Kyle	Kyle Jack – Im A Duchess	Charlie Lister (Peterborough)	29.04	3-1	
1994	Westmead Chick	Im Slippy – Westmead Move	Nick Savva (Walthamstow)	28.56	4-5f	
1997	Saradeb	Slaneyside Hare – Genotin Laura	Jimmy Gibson (Private)	28.62	1-1f	
1999	Westmead Striker	Daleys Denis – Westmead Chick	Charlie Lister (Private)	28.46	5-1	
2000	Wise Emerald	Trade Official – Try A Minnie	Charlie Lister (Private)	28.31	4-1	
2001	Ballydaly Score	Top Honcho – Ballydaly Gem	John Mullins (Walthamstow)	28.54	9-4	
2002	Aranock Lance	Trade Official – Aranock Girl	Paul Young (Romford)	28.69	10-1	
2003	Lodgeview Flash	Top Honcho – Egmont Hazel	Danny Talbot (Private)	28.91	11-4	
2005	Lig Do Scith	Matric Tiger - Aqueduct Tune	John Kavanagh (Ireland)	55.98	5-4	
2006	Rosshill View	Smooth Rumble – Pleasant Memory	Chris Allsopp (Monmore)	55.72	4-5f	

Discontinued

== Venues & Distances ==
- 1945–2006 (Hall Green, 474 metres)

== Sponsors ==
- 1994-1994 (Foster)
- 1998-1998 (Carling Black Label)
- 2001-2001 (William Hill)
- 2002-2002 (Ian Foster)
- 2003-2003 (Stadium Bookmakers)
- 2005-2005 (Ladbrokes)
- 2006-2006 (Net McAuleys in Spain)
