= 1972 UK & Ireland Greyhound Racing Year =

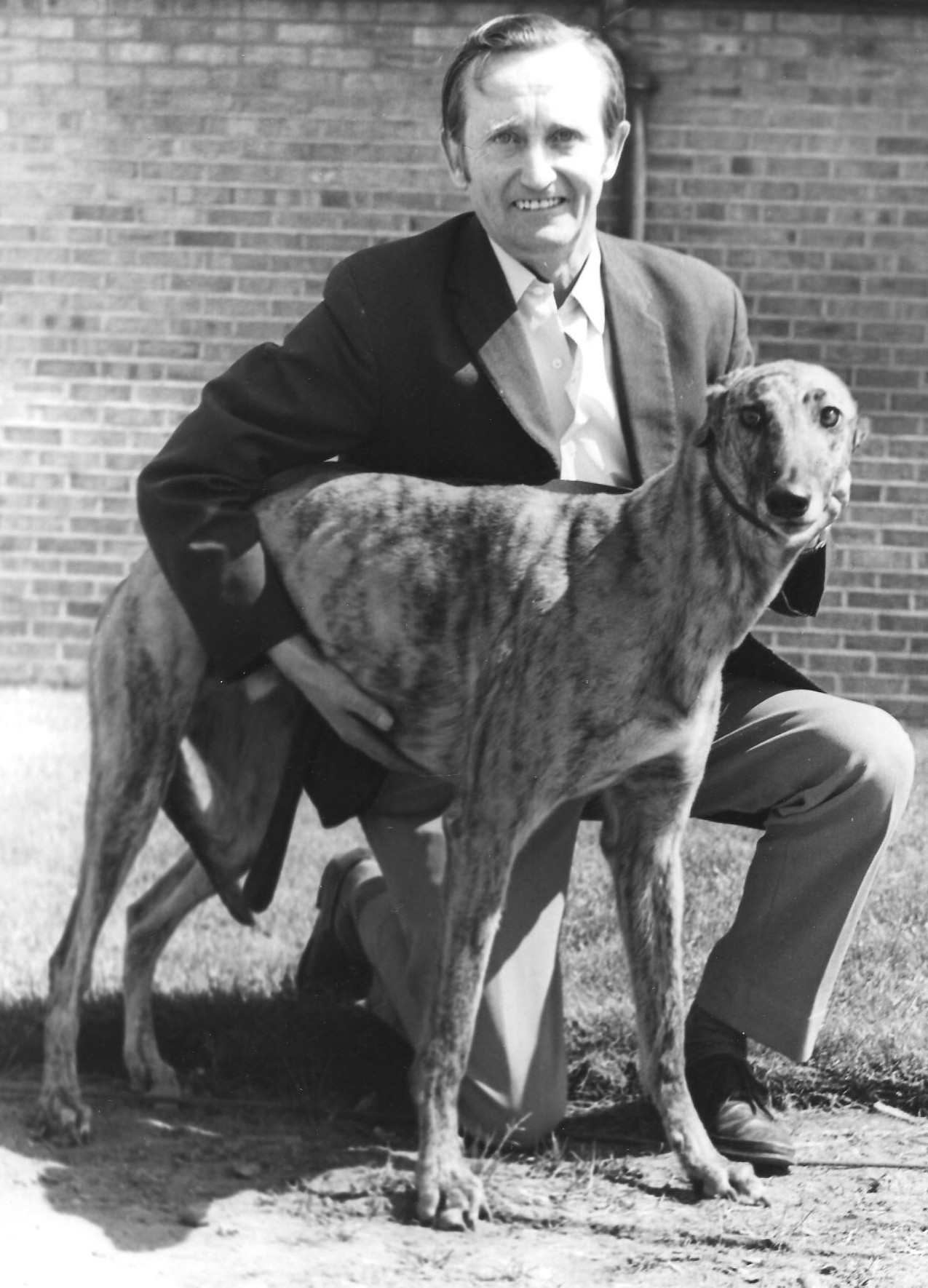
- St Leger champion Ramdeen Stuart with trainer Norman Oliver

The 1972 UK & Ireland Greyhound Racing Year was the 47th year of greyhound racing in the United Kingdom and the 46th year of greyhound racing in Ireland.

== Roll of honour ==
Major Winners
| Award | Name of Winner |
|---|---|
| 1972 English Greyhound Derby | Patricias Hope |
| 1972 Irish Greyhound Derby | Catsrock Daisy |
| 1972 Scottish Greyhound Derby | Patricias Hope |
| 1972 Welsh Greyhound Derby | Patricias Hope |
| Greyhound Trainer of the Year | Tom Johnston Jr. |
| Greyhound of the Year | Patricias Hope |
| Irish Greyhound of the Year | Catsrock Daisy |

== Summary ==
The industry continued to suffer from multiple track closures, particularly those with a Greyhound Racing Association (GRA) link. The closures were a combination of the GRA Property Trust's intentions and reduced attendances blamed on competition from betting shops. The performances of Patricias Hope and Sherrys Prince brought enjoyment to the industry, during a turbulent period and both wrote themselves into the history books.

The annual National Greyhound Racing Club (NGRC) returns were released, with totalisator turnover at £54,401,529 and attendances recorded at 6,279,898 from 5592 meetings. Government tote tax was reduced from 5% to 4%. The National Greyhound Racing Club and National Greyhound Racing Society amalgamated to form one controlling body called the National Greyhound Racing Club Ltd.

== Tracks ==
The last meeting was held at the 100,000 capacity West Ham Stadium, on 26 May, the GRA Property Trust sold the venue during a property boom. The prestigious Cesarewitch was transferred to GRA sister track Belle Vue and the Cambridgeshire switched to White City. Trainers Colin West, Ted Parker, Sidney Mann and Kenric Appleton all joined other GRA tracks, while Noreen Collin joined Walthamstow. GRA was losing its status as greyhound racing's most respected company due to the fact that they were actively buying tracks to sell for development and boost their Greyhound Property Trust share prices. They had recently purchased three tracks Carntyne Stadium, White City Stadium (Liverpool) and Portsmouth Stadium for the sole purpose of selling them for lucrative commercial properties. They also sealed a deal that brought Wimbledon Stadium fully under the GRA banner. Carntyne in Glasgow was the first track to suffer closure during May.

Hendon Greyhound Stadium closed two days after West Ham, to make way for the new Brent Cross Shopping Centre. Milton Keynes Greyhound Stadium (also known as Bletchley or Groveway) joined the NGRC banner after switching from its independent status. Scotland and Glasgow lost two tracks, Carntyne and the White City Stadium, Glasgow which was demolished to make way for the M8 motorway. Two other popular tracks Clapton Stadium and Rayleigh Weir Stadium were both in danger of shutting after being purchased by property developers but they were at least operating for the present. Rayleigh promoter Tom Stanley admitted the offer for the 12 acre Essex site was too good to refuse.

Independent tracks Tams Brig and Pennycross in Plymouth both closed, the former was replaced by a curling rink. Preston suffered a major fire that would require a total rebuild of the stand and tote equipment. To compound issues, government power cuts were frequent in January and February which forced many tracks to cut their racing schedules.

== News ==
GRA Director of Racing, Major Percy Brown retired after 40 years in the sport, he had started as Racing Manager in 1931 at Belle Vue, his replacement was Arthur Aldridge. Owlerton Racing Manager Sam Vinter also retired after 40 years’ service. Harringay became the home of Greyhound racing on London Weekend Television's World of Sport for the next decade.

Catford was the first London stadium to attempt eight dog racing; the track was substantially altered with steep banking on the bends at significant cost. Public acceptance never came through and the experiment would finish by the end of the year. The NGRC also relaxed the rule that previously did not allow any NGRC owner or trainer to attend an independent track. Although they could now attend, they were still not allowed to run their greyhounds on independent tracks.

Trainer John Coleman departed Romford after being appointed at Wembley. Oxford trainer Bernard Cousins was killed in a car crash along with two of his greyhounds. Dolores Rocket's litter brother Come On Wonder broke the track records at West Ham (550y) and Crayford (700y) before being disqualified and going on to race on the independent circuits winning the Henlow Derby and Ashfield St Leger.

== Competitions ==
A new event the Sussex Cup was introduced at Brighton.

The Grand National at White City arrived in April and Sherrys Prince qualified for the final amidst huge interest from the greyhound public, this remarkable hurdler went to the traps as 5/4 favourite and recorded his third successive title. The brindle dog whelped in April 1967 was owned by Mrs Joyce Matthews and had been schooled for hurdles in 1969 after finishing his flat career. He ran in 105 hurdle races winning 70 and finishing second 15 times and set 15 track records and all of this was achieved despite a broken hock in the final of the 1970 Scottish Grand National and a serious kidney infection in 1972.

Derby champion Patricias Hope was aimed at both the Welsh Greyhound Derby and Scottish Greyhound Derby in an attempt to emulate the only previous triple crown winners Trev's Perfection and Mile Bush Pride. The white and fawn dog owned by Gordon and Basil Marks and trained by Adam Jackson defeated a first class field at Cardiff that included Super Rory, Decimal Queen and Pall Mall Stakes champion Camira Story. By the end of July Patricias Hope became the third greyhound to achieve the magical Triple Crown feat after winning the Scottish Derby final. Super Rory had broken the track record in the semi-finals but lost yet again to Patricias Hope in the final, the latter was sent back to Ireland for stud duties for six months.

Cricket Bunny trained by Joe Booth denied Don't Gambol a third successive Scurry Gold Cup triumph and then won the Laurels at Wimbledon. The husband and wife team of Nick and Natalie Savva bred litters with a prefix called Westmead, a name that would become synonymous over the next forty years. Their first classic success came with Westmead Lane in the Cesarewitch, an event that was now held over the marathon distance at Belle Vue and not West Ham.

Ramdeen Stuart is bought for 260 guineas at the Shelbourne Park sales, he joined trainer Norman Oliver and by the end of the year won the St Leger at Wembley, the Steward's Cup at Wimbledon over 700 yards, the Scottish St Leger and Ben Truman Stakes.

== Ireland ==
Newbridge Greyhound Stadium opened in County Kildare four years after the old track had closed at St Conleth's Park. Gay McKenna secured a record fourth Irish Greyhound Derby title with Catsrock Daisy.

== Principal UK races ==
Grand National, White City (April 15 525y h, £750)
| Pos | Name of Greyhound | Trainer | SP | Time | Trap |
|---|---|---|---|---|---|
| 1st | Sherrys Prince | Colin West | 5-4f | 29.80 | 4 |
| 2nd | Lee Falk | | 14-1 | 30.30 | 6 |
| 3rd | Derry Palm | Phil Rees Sr. | 5-1 | 30.32 | 5 |
| 4th | Adamstown Valley | Joe Pickering | 3-1 | 30.72 | 3 |
| 5th | Nashville King | | 20-1 | 31.00 | 2 |
| 6th | Ragtime | John Coleman | 11-2 | 31.20 | 1 |

Gold Collar, Catford (May 13, 610y, £1,500)
| Pos | Name of Greyhound | Trainer | SP | Time | Trap |
|---|---|---|---|---|---|
| 1st | Rathmartin | Clare Orton | 7-4 | 35.36 | 5 |
| 2nd | Clane Rain | | 8-1 | 35.58 | 3 |
| 3rd | Pallas Melody | Phil Rees Sr. | 6-1 | 35.88 | 6 |
| 4th | Westmead Lane | Natalie Savva | 5-1 | 36.08 | 4 |
| 5th | Linmaree | Colin West | 6-4f | 36.54 | 2 |
| 6th | Coolin Ranger | | 20-1 | 36.55 | 1 |

Oaks, Harringay (May 19, 525y, £1,500)
| Pos | Name of Greyhound | Trainer | SP | Time | Trap |
|---|---|---|---|---|---|
| 1st | Decimal Queen | Mick Hawkins | 6-4f | 28.60 | 5 |
| 2nd | Gahans Wood | Paddy Keane | 10-3 | 28.80 | 2 |
| 3rd | Catsrock Daisy | Sammy Easton | 3-1 | 28.81 | 6 |
| 4th | Real Grand | Frank Baldwin | 7-1 | 29.05 | 1 |
| 5th | Carrow Fancy | Arthur Hancock | 7-1 | 29.09 | 3 |
| 6th | Mad Drive | Clare Orton | 16-1 | 29.57 | 4 |

Welsh Derby, Arms Park (Jul 8, 525y £1,000)
| Pos | Name of Greyhound | Trainer | SP | Time | Trap |
|---|---|---|---|---|---|
| 1st | Patricias Hope | Adam Jackson | 3-1 | 29.75 | 3 |
| 2nd | Another Sunrise | Harry Bamford | 6-1 | 30.25 | 6 |
| 3rd | Camira Story | Adam Jackson | 4-1 | 30.31 | 5 |
| 4th | Decimal Queen | Mick Hawkins | 8-1 | 30.55 | 4 |
| 5th | Blackwater Glory | | 20-1 | 30.59 | 1 |
| 6th | Super Rory | Noreen Collin | 7-4f | 30.63 | 2 |

Scurry Gold Cup, Clapton (Jul 15, 400y £1,000)
| Pos | Name of Greyhound | Trainer | SP | Time | Trap |
|---|---|---|---|---|---|
| 1st | Cricket Bunny | Joe Booth | 6-1 | 22.77 | 3 |
| 2nd | Don't Gambol | Paddy McEvoy | 1-2f | 22.99 | 4 |
| 3rd | Free Bond | | 14-1 | 23.07 | 1 |
| 4th | Schemer | | 16-1 | 23.25 | 2 |
| 5th | Moordyke Sweep | Charlie Coyle | 10-1 | 23.28 | 6 |
| 6th | Wonder Tonic | Charlie Coyle | 7-1 | 23.46 | 5 |

Scottish Greyhound Derby, Shawfield (Jul 29, 525y, £2,000)
| Pos | Name of Greyhound | Trainer | SP | Time | Trap |
|---|---|---|---|---|---|
| 1st | Patricias Hope | Adam Jackson | 9-2 | 29.22 | 4 |
| 2nd | Priory Hi | Pen Andrews | 5-1 | 29.28 | 2 |
| 3rd | Super Rory | Noreen Collin | 4-6f | 29.34 | 1 |
| 4th | Glen Ski | J Doyle – Shawfield | 6-1 | 29.54 | 5 |
| 5th | Camira Story | Adam Jackson | 12-1 | 29.86 | 3 |
| N/R | Dark Crag | | | | |

St Leger, Wembley (Sep 5, 700y, £1,500)
| Pos | Name of Greyhound | Trainer | SP | Time | Trap |
|---|---|---|---|---|---|
| 1st | Ramdeen Stuart | Norman Oliver | 2-1 | 39.82 | 1 |
| 2nd | Cowboy Jo | Mick Hawkins | 16-1 | 40.12 | 2 |
| 3rd | Knock Off | Harry Bamford | 7-2 | 40.15 | 6 |
| 4th | Scintillas Gem | Paddy Milligan | 14-1 | 40.35 | 4 |
| 5th | Westmead County | Natalie Savva | 11-10f | 40.59 | 3 |
| N/R | Todos Bella | Dave Geggus | | | |

Laurels, Wimbledon (Sep 22, 500y, £5,000)
| Pos | Name of Greyhound | Trainer | SP | Time | Trap |
|---|---|---|---|---|---|
| 1st | Cricket Bunny | Joe Booth | 10-3 | 28.11 | 4 |
| 2nd | Priory Hi | Pen Andrews | 2-1 | 28.15 | 6 |
| 3rd | Skyhawk | Tommy Johnston Jr. | 11-2 | 28.23 | 5 |
| 4th | Carry On Monalee | Clare Orton | 7-1 | 28.25 | 3 |
| 5th | Short Cake | Sid Ryall | 7-4f | 28.33 | 1 |
| 6th | Kyle Legacy | | 20-1 | 28.65 | 2 |

Cesarewitch, Belle Vue (Sep 30, 880y, £2,000)
| Pos | Name of Greyhound | Trainer | SP | Time | Trap |
|---|---|---|---|---|---|
| 1st | Westmead Lane | Natalie Savva | 11-4 | 51.65 | 2 |
| 2nd | Albany Ranger | Eddie Moore | 12-1 | 51.68 | 6 |
| 3rd | Westmead Tower | Natalie Savva | 3-1 | 51.70 | 4 |
| 4th | Cum Laude | | 7-1 | 51.80 | 1 |
| 5th | Adamstown Socks | | 16-1 | 51.90 | 3 |
| 6th | Knock Off | Harry Bamford | 11-10f | 51.92 | 5 |

== Totalisator returns ==
Extended content

The totalisator returns declared to the licensing authorities for the year 1972 are listed below.

| Stadium | Turnover £ |
|---|---|
| London (White City) | 6,602,514 |
| London (Walthamstow) | 4,411,553 |
| London (Wimbledon) | 4,168,251 |
| London (Harringay) | 3,485,919 |
| London (Wembley) | 2,613,485 |
| London (Catford) | 2,484,991 |
| London (Clapton) | 2,066,410 |
| Romford | 1,840,960 |
| Manchester (Belle Vue) | 1,703,944 |
| Edinburgh (Powderhall) | 1,607,793 |
| Brighton & Hove | 1,491,977 |
| Birmingham (Hall Green) | 1,450,974 |
| Crayford & Bexleyheath | 1,275,684 |
| Birmingham (Perry Barr, old) | 1,271,689 |
| Newcastle (Brough Park) | 1,131,689 |
| Glasgow (Shawfield) | 1,091,184 |

| Stadium | Turnover £ |
|---|---|
| Southend-on-Sea | 1,081,753 |
| Slough | 956,412 |
| Leeds (Elland Road) | 931,361 |
| Manchester (White City) | 925,441 |
| London (Hackney) | 825,056 |
| Sheffield (Owlerton) | 821,678 |
| Wolverhampton (Monmore) | 726,624 |
| Bristol (Eastville) | 701,198 |
| Gloucester & Cheltenham | 685,854 |
| Manchester (Salford) | 600,312 |
| Newcastle (Gosforth) | 557,750 |
| Cardiff (Arms Park) | 554,100 |
| Derby | 552,364 |
| Rochester & Chatham | 527,811 |
| Poole | 484,625 |
| Willenhall | 481,392 |

| Stadium | Turnover £ |
|---|---|
| Ramsgate (Dumpton Park) | 464,553 |
| Liverpool (White City) | 448,882 |
| Oxford | 421,285 |
| Reading (Oxford Road) | 415,504 |
| Portsmouth | 361,999 |
| Cradley Heath | 301,472 |
| Rayleigh (Essex) | 293,441 |
| Leicester (Blackbird Rd) | 279,469 |
| Middlesbrough | 278,360 |
| Preston | 241,988 |
| Hull (Old Craven Park) | 241,117 |
| Wakefield | 203,824 |
| Swindon | 199,520 |
| Milton Keynes | 137,411 |
