= 1968 UK & Ireland Greyhound Racing Year =

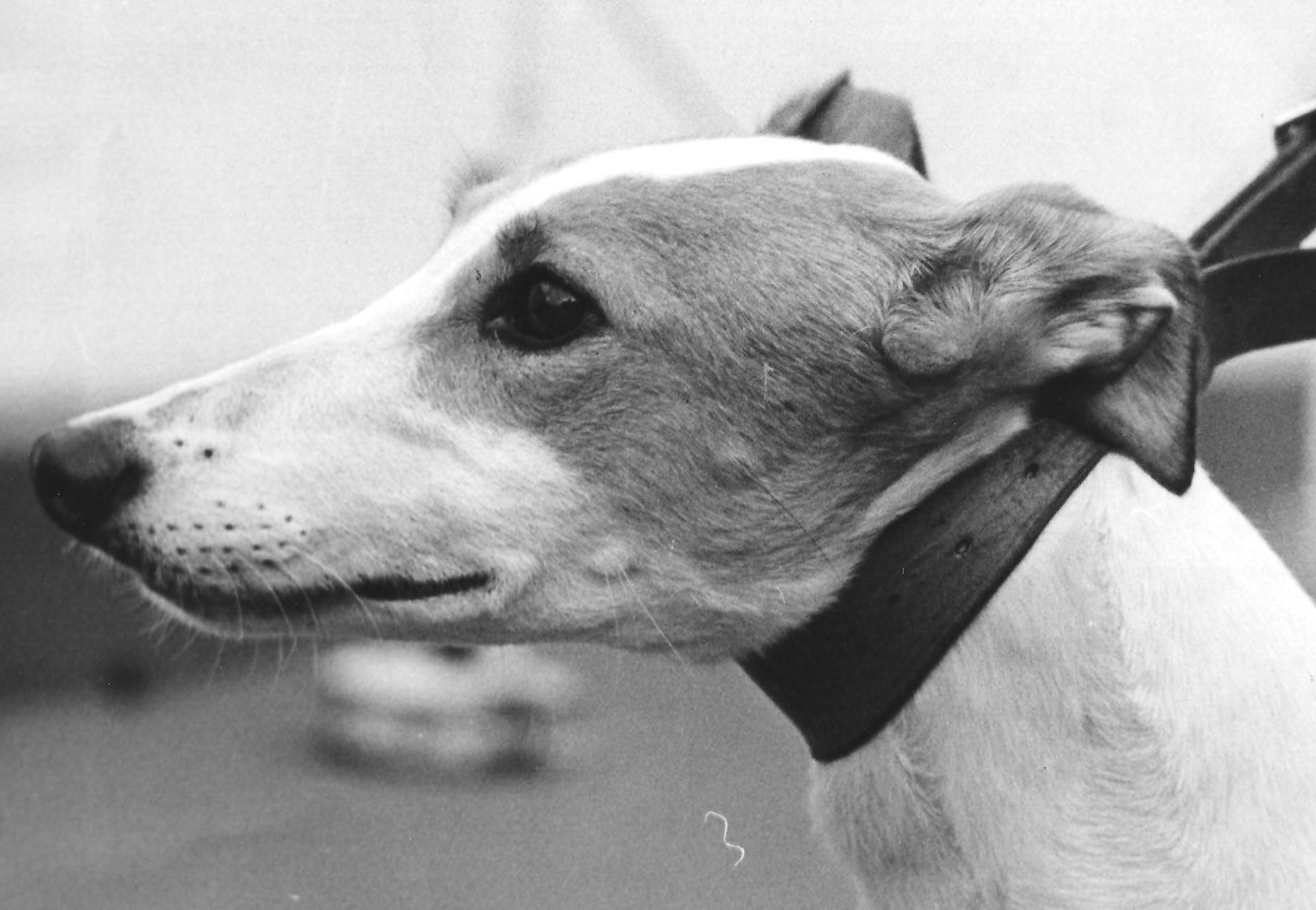
- Oaks champion Shady Parachute

The 1968 UK & Ireland Greyhound Racing Year was the 43rd year of greyhound racing in the United Kingdom and the 42nd year of greyhound racing in Ireland.

== Roll of honour ==
Major Winners
Award	Name of Winner
1968 English Greyhound Derby	Camira Flash
1968 Irish Greyhound Derby	Yellow Printer
1968 Scottish Greyhound Derby	Lisamote Precept
1968 Welsh Greyhound Derby	Swift Half
Greyhound Trainer of the Year	Phil Rees Sr.
Greyhound of the Year	Yellow Printer
Irish Greyhound of the Year	Russian Gun

== Summary ==
A greyhound called Yellow Printer arrived on the racing scene and was regarded as the fastest greyhound for many years. The fawn dog was voted Greyhound of the year and won the Irish Greyhound Derby, in addition to setting a new world record over 525 yards of 28.30 seconds at White City Greyhounds.

Prince Philip, Duke of Edinburgh was presented with greyhound called Camira Flash, to become the sports most prominent greyhound owner. The fawn and white greyhound was given to him at a charity meeting at Harringay Stadium just over a month before the Derby started, with the condition that all prize money earned would go to the Duke Of Edinburgh Awards Scheme. The greyhound went on to win the 1968 English Greyhound Derby.

== Tracks ==
The Greyhound Racing Association (GRA) closed the operation at Stamford Bridge on 1 August, which left a gap on the Bookamkers Afternnon Greyhound Service (BAGS), which was taken by New Cross Stadium. Stamford Bridge trainer Sid Mann switched his runners to West Ham Stadium.

Abbey Stadium changed over to National Greyhound Racing Club rules in April and Cambridge opened on the 6 October as an independent track.

== News ==
The foot and mouth disease had continued into early 1968, which forced racing to lose more fixtures. A new publication started called the Greyhound Magazine with the intention of giving the sport complete coverage, although the Sporting Life gave results coverage, it did not give an inside view of the sport itself.

In September the GRA moved all of the greyhounds out of the Clapton Stadium kennels at Claverhambury Farm and the West Ham Stadium kennels and put them at the training establishment at Hook Estate and Kennels, in Northaw. The kennels would now house all trainers from Harringay, White City, Clapton and West Ham which brought the estate under considerable pressure. Furthermore the move indicated that the GRA directors had earmarked Clapton and West Ham as possible future sales. Trainer Paddy Keane acted quickly and moved back to Ireland to train from kennels there. In a further change George Curtis left Portsmouth for Brighton.

Eastville Stadium became one of the first circuits to abandon grass, becoming sand based, many tracks would follow suit over the next decade. John Jolliffe, Racing Manager at Wembley Greyhounds retired after a 37 year career that started as Dundee Racing Manager, then Aberdeen and Cardiff, before his Wembley appointment.

Trainer Dick Carter and his wife Patricia were killed in a car crash on Christmas Eve 1968, leaving the Reading stadium management and bookmakers organising a trust fund for their two daughters.

== Ireland ==
The Bord na gCon invested heavily into Irish tracks, purchasing Shelbourne Park and putting £240,000 of investment into the track. It received an added bonus when it was decided that it would host the Irish Greyhound Derby every year from 1970.

== Competitions ==
In the Western Produce Stakes trainer Jim Morgan owned and trained the first three home, Happy Harry relegated sister Hiver Whitenose and brother Harrys Oppo to the minor placings. Tric Trac returned to racing for a short time, after taking a rest from stud duties and won the Wimbledon Champion Stakes; he died shortly afterwards following a kennel accident. Yellow Printer won the Wembley Summer Cup before heading for Ireland and the Irish Greyhound Derby. After returning to England he won the Anglo Irish International.

Forward King, one of the exceptional Leo Stack litter, won the St Leger at Wembley Greyhounds and the Scottish St Leger, the only dog ever to have won both. He also won the Wembley Gold Cup and the Cock of the North. He won half of his 70 open events but might never have reached a race track at all because when he was twelve months old, he escaped from his kennels and lived wild on the Yorkshire moors for several weeks before being recaptured.

The year ended with a major challenge at Limerick when the leading Irish star Flaming King trained by Tony Quigley, met Yellow Printer now under the charge of Paddy Milligan. The race was won by Flaming King and Yellow Printer's owner Pauline Wallis reacted by buying Flaming King for £5,000 from Frank Moran and taking him back to England.

== Principal UK races ==
Grand National, White City (April 20 525y h, £500)
Pos	Name of Greyhound	Trainer	SP	Time	Trap
1st	Ballintore Tiger	Norman Chambers	1-3f	29.50	1
2nd	Benmore Prince	Nora Gleeson	11-2	29.88	4
3rd	Super Fame	Nora Gleeson	12-1	30.44	6
4th	Handy John		25-1	30.58	5
5th	Big Crackers		33-1	30.90	3
6th	Shells Tiger	Clare Orton	12-1	30.91	2

BBC Sportsview TV Trophy, Romford (Apr 23, 880y, £1,000)
Pos	Name of Greyhound	Trainer	SP	Time	Trap
1st	Shady Begonia	Norman Oliver	2-1f	50.53	
2nd	Hi There Snow				
3rd	Poor Mick	Randy Singleton			
4th	Old Irish	Gilbert Shaw			
5th	Forward King	Ted Brennan			
6th	Miss Taft	Bob Burls			

Gold Collar, Catford (May 11, 570y, £1,500)
Pos	Name of Greyhound	Trainer	SP	Time	Trap
1st	Shanes Rocket	Paddy Milligan	7-2	33.39	3
2nd	Ballyneale Kim	Tom Reilly	9-2	33.79	5
3rd	Greenville Boy	John Horsfall	9-2	34.07	6
4th	Discretions	Dave Geggus	7-4f	34.09	1
5th	Breachs Bills	Paddy Milligan	10-1	34.13	4
6th	Surprising Fella	Jack Smith	8-1	34.37	2

The Grand Prix, Walthamstow (Jun 1, 600y, £500)
Pos	Name of Greyhound	Trainer	SP	Time	Trap
1st	Carmen John	J Millis	10-1	41.16	5
2nd	Spotted Nice	Tom Johnston Jr.	3-1	41.30	4
3rd	Lissadell Como	Jimmy Jowett	4-1	41.62	2
4th	Conna Queen		10-1	41.72	1
5th	Fully Booked	Eric Adkins	4-1	41.78	3
6th	Keen Dew	Tom Johnston Jr.	3-1	00.00	6

Welsh Derby, Arms Park (Jun 29, 525y £500)
Pos	Name of Greyhound	Trainer	SP	Time	Trap
1st	Swift Half	Jim Irving	9-2	29.58	5
2nd	Moose Jet		12-1	29.82	4
3rd	Hack Up Georgie	Phil Rees Sr.	20-1	30.16	6
4th	Ballinaglough		20-1	30.32	3
5th	Discretions	Dave Geggus	4-5f	30.36	2
6th	El Campo	Jim Irving	3-1	30.52	1

Oaks, Harringay (Jul 1, 525y, £1,000)
Pos	Name of Greyhound	Trainer	SP	Time	Trap
1st	Shady Parachute	Phil Rees Sr.	1-2f	29.38	1
2nd	Shady Hobby		12-1	29.68	4
3rd	Brinmark Suzy	Jim Singleton	8-1	29.71	3
4th	Sid's Rose	Noreen Collin	4-1	30.11	2
5th	Ciarraidhe	John Bassett	20-1	30.19	5
N/R	Keymer Jill	Charlie Curtis			

Scurry Gold Cup, Clapton (Jul 13, 400y £1,000)
Pos	Name of Greyhound	Trainer	SP	Time	Trap
1st	Foyle Tonic	Paddy Keane	15-8f	22.59	3
2nd	Bygone Time	Paddy Keane	11-4	22.95	1
3rd	Monkhams Express		20-1	23.41	5
4th	Fionas Chance	Barney O'Connor	12-1	23.47	2
5th	Hi Moments		2-1	23.57	6
6th	Model Grand	Dave Barker	25-1	23.71	4

Laurels, Wimbledon (Aug 9, 500y, £1,500)
Pos	Name of Greyhound	Trainer	SP	Time	Trap
1st	Ambiguous	Paddy McEvoy	8-1	28.10	4
2nd	Shady Parachute	Phil Rees Sr.	4-5f	28.11	5
3rd	Petrovitch	Jack Harvey	6-1	28.43	1
4th	Kerry Long Ago	Paddy Milligan	4-1	28.44	6
5th	Beaverwood Wind	Stan Martin	12-1	28.62	3
6th	Duck Snatcher	Adam Jackson	20-1	28.82	2

St Leger, Wembley (Aug 26, 700y, £1,500)
Pos	Name of Greyhound	Trainer	SP	Time	Trap
1st	Forward King	Ted Brennan	9-4	39.98	1
2nd	Cream Puff II	Tom Johnston Jr.	5-2	40.22	3
3rd	Hiver Whitenose	Vicky Holloway	15-8f	40.26	5
4th	Ballygill Rover	Jim Singleton	20-1	40.42	4
5th	Clueless Pigalle	Paddy McEvoy	10-1	40.56	6
6th	Deise Flash	Jack Harvey	33-1	40.86	2

Scottish Greyhound Derby, Carntyne (Aug 31, 525y, £1,000)
Pos	Name of Greyhound	Trainer	SP	Time	Trap
1st	Lisamote Precept	Joe Kelly	5-1	28.93	1
2nd	Cu Luain	Jim Brennan	7-1	28.95	2
3rd	Prairie Jet	Paddy Coughlan	1-1f	28.99	4
4th	Super Kid	Joe Pickering	12-1	29.05	6
5th	Quiet Cheer	Joe Booth	4-1	29.08	3
6th	Hack Up Georgie	Phil Rees Sr.	8-1	29.12	5

Cesarewitch, West Ham (Oct 4, 600y, £1,500)
Pos	Name of Greyhound	Trainer	SP	Time	Trap
1st	Deen Valley	Paddy Keane	4-5f	33.29	1
2nd	Badge of Fancy	Tom Johnston Jr.	7-1	33.35	3
3rd	Prince Ringo	Jack Harvey	8-1	33.41	6
4th	Willing Billie	Noreen Collin	12-1	33.46	4
5th	Shady Begonia	Norman Oliver	5-2	33.50	2
6th	Fire Trap	Paddy McEvoy	12-1	33.74	3

== Totalisator returns ==
Extended content

The totalisator returns declared to the licensing authorities for the year 1968 are listed below.

Stadium	Turnover £
London (White City)	6,309,024
London (Wimbledon)	3,972,064
London (Harringay)	3,711,958
London (Walthamstow)	3,626,404
London (Wembley)	2,887,589
Manchester (Belle Vue)	2,280,860
London (Catford)	2,199,834
London (West Ham)	1,999,279
London (Clapton)	1,933,664
London (Hendon)	1,686,713
Romford	1,638,605
Edinburgh (Powderhall)	1,488,177
Manchester (White City)	1,368,519
Birmingham (Perry Barr, old)	1,368,054
London (Charlton)	1,293,979
Brighton & Hove	1,258,339
London (Hackney)	1,250,685
Birmingham (Hall Green)	1,240,832
London (New Cross)	1,170,341
Newcastle (Brough Park)	1,108,106

Stadium	Turnover £
Glasgow (Shawfield)	1,043,003
London (Park Royal)	1,036,574
Crayford & Bexleyheath	946,751
Slough	938,006
Wolverhampton (Monmore)	910,976
Leeds (Elland Road)	853,544
Glasgow (White City)	851,393
Manchester (Salford)	834,695
Sheffield (Owlerton)	827,124
Bristol (Eastville)	817,051
Newcastle (Gosforth)	721,345
Southend-on-Sea	717,160
Willenhall	715,099
London (Stamford Bridge)	703,205
Gloucester & Cheltenham	686,844
Birmingham (Kings Heath)	650,388
Cardiff (Arms Park)	624,127
Liverpool (White City)	587,254
Poole	570,807
Reading (Oxford Road)	551,253

Stadium	Turnover £
Derby	524,353
Ramsgate (Dumpton Park)	521,997
Bradford (Greenfield)	504,981
Cradley Heath	490,596
Rochester & Chatham	469,712
Oxford	427,720
Glasgow (Carntyne)	416,034
Portsmouth	394,804
Leicester (Blackbird Rd)	361,202
Middlesbrough	340,907
Nottingham (White City)	301,450
Rayleigh (Essex)	291,408
Hull (Old Craven Park)	289,295
Preston	282,625
Aberdeen	239,956
Norwich (City)	235,807
Wakefield	176,812
Swindon	95,860
