= Parkside Sports Stadium =

Sports venue in the UK

- Location: Leeds, West Yorkshire
- Coordinates: 53°46′14″N 1°32′14″W
- Opened: 1932
- Closed: 1963

Parkside Sports Stadium was a greyhound racing stadium in an area known as Hunslet Carr between Hunslet and Belle Isle.

== Origins ==
The Parkside Sports Stadium was constructed in 1932 near the Hunslet rugby league ground on the opposite side of the Middleton mineral railway and main tramway. The stadium became the third stadium to race greyhounds in Leeds after Elland Road Greyhound Stadium and Fullerton Park although the latter by now was only running speedway.

== Opening ==
Racing started on 12 December 1932 under the promotion of Parkside Stadium Ltd who chose to affiliate themselves with the British Greyhound Tracks Control Society (BGTCS), an organisation formed to assist tracks wishing to race under regulations and a rival to the larger National Greyhound Racing Club (NGRC). The main stand was situated on the north side with the paddock located on the Old Run Road where the Great Northern Railway (Hunslet branch) passed over the road.

== History ==
When the BGTCS disbanded in 1935 the track remained independent (unaffiliated to a governing body) so as to appeal to a different clientele including owner trainers. Facilities remained basic with covered stands and a licensed club with car parking available. Race distances included 290 and 429 yards mainly over handicaps. After the war the track raced every Wednesday and Saturday evening with trams number 12 & 26 stopping outside of the entrance gates.

== Closure ==
The track closed on 12 October 1963 and was demolished making way for a new motorway that today is the M621 near junction six.
