= Kings Heath Stadium =

Former greyhound racing track in Birmingham

- Location: Kings Heath, Birmingham
- Coordinates: 52°25′12″N 1°53′21″W
- Opened: 21 May 1927
- Closed: 31 March 1971

Kings Heath Stadium was a greyhound racing track in Birmingham that existed from 1927 to 1971.

== History ==
=== Origins and Opening ===
In 1927 the British Greyhound Sports Club (BGSC) acquired the lease of the King's Heath Horse Show Ground, on the south side of Taylor Road and which was accessed off the east side of Alcester Road South. The first race meeting was on 21 May 1927, beating rival track Hall Green Stadium in the race to open by two months. The BGSC company also owned four other tracks in 1927, Darnall Stadium in Sheffield, Knowle Stadium in Bristol, Boulevard Stadium in Hull and St Annes in Blackpool. The new facilities included a main grandstand with a capacity of 3,000 and a concrete slope in front of the grandstand that could accommodate a further 2,000 people. The stadium capacity was estimated to be around 20,000 and the new build was overseen by Mr J. P. Hughes of the BGSC.

A nearby football ground used by Birmingham Corporation Tramways F.C. was also called King's Heath Stadium at the time.

=== Pre-war ===
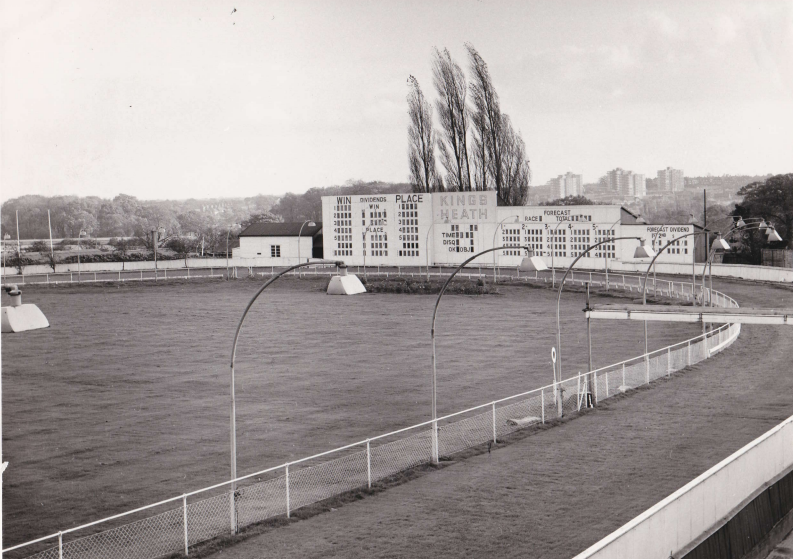
Kings Heath Greyhound Stadium c.1960

Towards the end of 1927 greyhound racing had proven successful and a new company called the Associated Greyhound Racecourses Limited was formed and they purchased eight tracks including the five BGSC tracks.

On 7 October 1935, an 18 year lease was acquired by Herbert Leo Craven (the Managing Director of the Long Eaton and Perry Barr stadiums at the time) and he introduced a major new event called the Lincoln. The first running of the Lincoln was in 1936 and was won by Slightly Polly trained by Arthur Doc Callanan.

On 27 May 1939 a serious fire destroyed the on-site kennels killing 17 greyhounds and the actions of a local resident Fred Shaw and four others stopped further tragedy by rescuing the remaining number that were kennelled (around 100 were in the kennels at the time).

=== Post-war ===
In 1949 the freehold was finally bought outright by the Kings Heath Racecourse Ltd. The track was described as a fair sized course with fairly easy turns and a good length run in despite the circuit having a small 390 yard circumference. The main distances were 480 and 675 yards and greyhounds chased an ‘Outside Sumner’ hare. On the Alcester Road South entrance there was the main stand featuring the Silver Club and Best Ring Club with matching betting rings. On the opposite side of the course were two covered stands, to the west was the popular betting ring and to the east were the racing kennels, isolation kennels and home kennels that included a rest room and surgery. Rest kennels were located at Cookhill in Worcestershire. Perspective owners had to pay kennel charges of one guinea per week and the greyhound would be accepted into the track kennels on the understanding that all greyhounds were subject to veterinary examination, National Greyhound Racing Club rules and company conditions.

The first track trained success came in 1948 when King Hero trained by P.E Frost won the Cambridgeshire at West Ham Stadium. Another race called the Midland Oaks was introduced and trainers included Jim Todd, Bill Bryant, Alf Gibbins, Len Bane and Mr Allen.

Following the 1964 closure of the Lythalls Lane Stadium in Coventry, a major race the prestigious Eclipse Stakes was transferred to the track. Following the formation of the Bookmakers Afternoon Greyhound Service (BAGS) in 1967 the track was chosen as one of the first four tracks to host live betting shop race meetings along with Oxford, Park Royal and Stamford Bridge.

=== Closure ===
The Greyhound Racing Association (GRA) purchased the stadium in 1970, which spelled the demise of the stadium. Under the GRA's Property Trust policy at the time, Kings Heath was one of many tracks that was to be sold for re-development.

The final race meeting was held on 31 March 1971 and the last race was won by Zansy Token before the developers demolished the stadium.

The north part of the stadium is now Wynfield and Leander Gardens and the south part is where the Cocks Moors Woods golf course stands.

== Competitions ==
=== The Lincoln ===
Year	Winner	Breeding	Trainer	Time (sec)	SP	Notes/Ref
1936	Slightly Potty	Bright Brindle – Burnbrite	Arthur Doc Callanan (Wembley)	36.70	7/4f	
1937	Hexham Bridge	Rally Round – Dainty Duchess	Bill Cowell (Southend)	28.64	3/1	
1938	Demotic Mack	Beef Cutlet – Kaiti Hill	Charles Cross (Clapton)	28.72	7/4f	
1939	Loyal Judy	Erins Best – Disputed Biddy	Bill Cowell (Wembley)	28.20	7/2	
1952	Sound Sprig	Astras Son – Nancys Sprig	Tom Perry (Private)	27.10	6/4f	
1953	Kettle Drum	Smoky Cutlet – La Saqlle Street	Dal Hawkesley (West Ham)	26.86	5/1	
1954	Manganstown Major	Sandown Champion – Good Night Kentucky	Ron Chamberlain (Private)	26.77	4/5f	
1955	Manganstown Major	Sandown Champion – Good Night Kentucky	Ron Chamberlain (Private)	26.60	7/2	
1956	Suir Villa Champion	Fedamore Victory – Slaney Rut	Ron Chamberlain (Private)	27.18	6/4f	
1957	Wish Me Luck	Marsh Harrier - Chaser	Ron Chamberlain (Private)	26.42	10/1	
1958	Five Up	Nine Up - Duplicate	Ron Chamberlain (Private)	26.60	5/4f	
1959	Wincot Clifford	Fly Prince - Whoosh	Jack Toseland (Perry Barr)	26.65	8/11f	
1960	Welcome Home	Hi There - Ophelia	Bill Gigg (Private)	26.38	4/6f	
1961	Welcome Home	Hi There - Ophelia	Vivien Pateman (Private)	26.51	5/4f	
1962	Poetic Licence	Knockrour Again – Tanyard Tan	Joe Booth (Private)	26.36	2/1	Track record
1963	Blackamoor	Graceful Man – Bright and Merry	Jimmy Jowett (Clapton)	27.21	8/1	
1964	Old Berry Silent	Silent Worship – Dromin Lass	Fred Berrow (Private)	26.42	5/2	
1965	Red Captain	Uncommon Man – Gower Grand	Ron Chamberlain (Private)	26.81	6/1	
1966	Kiddie Kut	Hi There – Carols Pride	Tony Dennis (Private)	27.42	5/1	
1967	Stately Boy	Knockrour Again – Little Margo	George Gooch (Preston)	27.26	9/2	
1968	Nancy's Flash	Prairie Flash – Biddy Mulligan	Paddy McEvoy (Wimbledon)	26.46	4/9f	
1969	Lisamote Precept	Hi Spark – Lisamote Queen	Joe Kelly (Leeds)	26.73	4/7f	
1970	Shady Shuffle	Lucky Hi There – Patrician Lady	Norman Oliver Brough Park	27.07	7/2	

1936-1970 (480 yards), 1940-1951 (not held)

== Track records ==
Yards	Greyhound	Time	Date	Notes
480	Demotic Mack	28.37	25 March 1938	
480	Hexham Bridge	28.22	2 April 1938	
480	Ilsley Darkie	27.70	12 October 1940	
480	Special Intention	27.12	September 1950	
480	Poetic Licence	26.36	14 April 1962	Lincoln final
480	Nancy's Flash	26.24	7 September 1967	
495	Peace Sprite	27.08	11 July 1964	Midland Oaks final
660	Konig Seiger	37.08	17 July 1965	
700	Inferior Cracker	39.94	25 May 1963	
880	Joystick	50.86	8 April 1964	TV Trophy heat
495 H	Happy Reveller	27.91	25 August 1965	Eclipse Hurdles semi final
495 H	Happy Reveller	27.79	28 August 1965	Eclipse Hurdles final
