= Powderhall Stadium =

Former stadium in Edinburgh, Scotland

Powderhall Stadium (1927-1995)
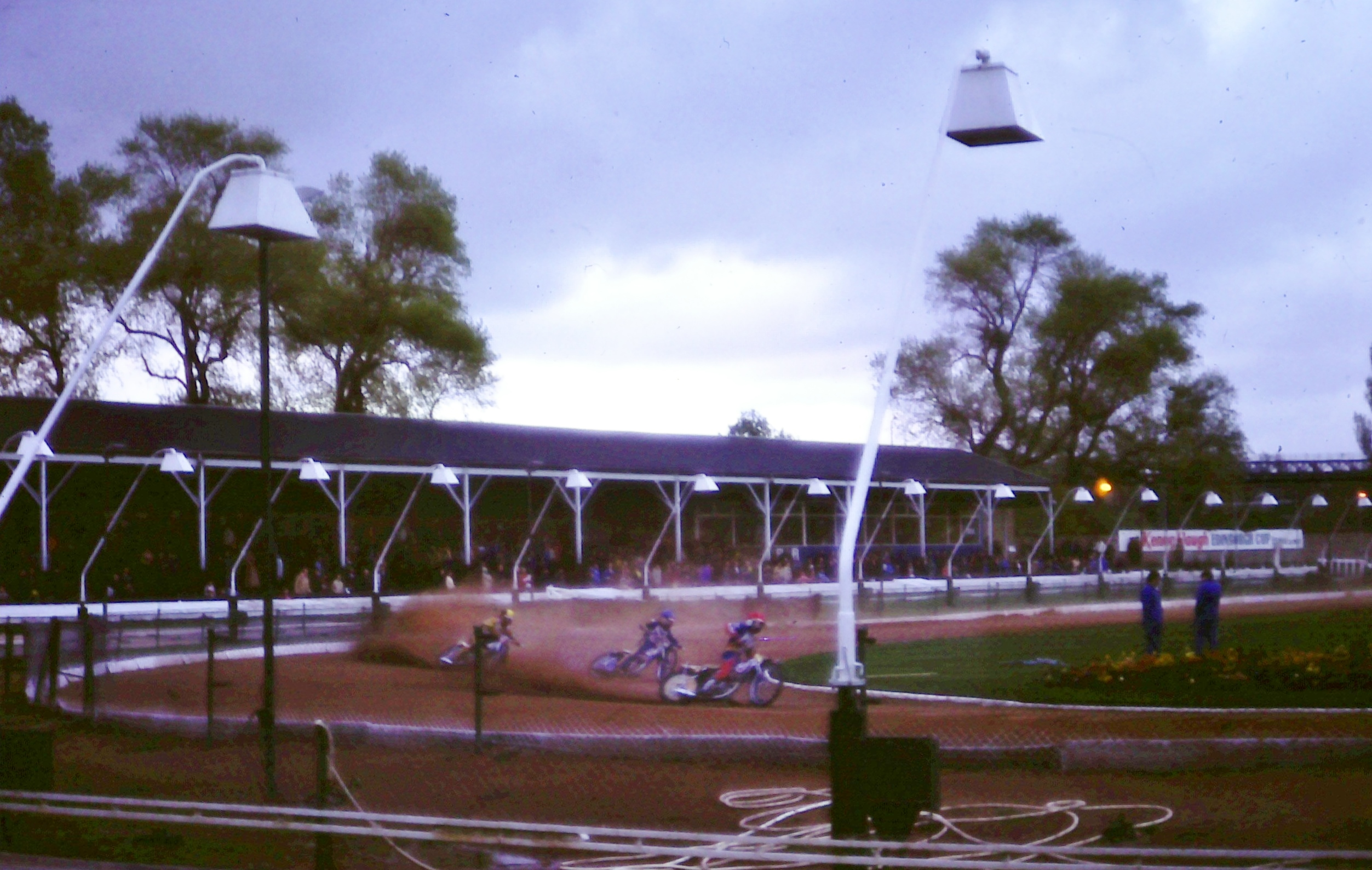
- Speedway at Powderhall in 1982.

- Location within the City of Edinburgh council area
- Former names: Powderhall Grounds (1870-1927)
- Location: North Edinburgh
- Coordinates: 55°58′00″N 3°11′37″W

Construction
- Built: 1869
- Opened: 1870
- Renovated: 1970 & 1987
- Expanded: 1927 greyhounds
- Closed: 1995

Powderhall Stadium, formerly the Powderhall Grounds, was a multi-sports facility overlooking the Water of Leith on Beaverhall Road, in the Powderhall (Broughton) area of northern Edinburgh, Scotland. It opened in January 1870 at the height of professional pedestrianism and was modelled on the stadium at Stamford Bridge in London. It hosted professional sprint races, track and field athletics, including the Scottish Amateur Athletics Championships on a number of occasions, professional football, international rugby, cycling, and dog races as well as boxing, quoits and pigeon shooting. For 100 years it hosted the Powderhall Sprint, the most famous professional sprint handicap in the world. With the decline of pedestrianism as a spectator sport in the 1920s it was converted to a greyhound stadium, hosting the Scottish Grand National for over sixty five years, and it also hosted professional speedway. The stadium finally closed in 1995 and the site is now a housing estate.

== Origins ==
In 1695, James Balfour, the Laird of Pilrig, obtained a charter from King William III that gave him the exclusive right to manufacture gunpowder in Scotland. This required the construction of a factory, known as a powder-mill, which was built to the north of the city of Edinburgh on the shore of the Water of Leith, a small tributary of the Firth of Forth. James Balfour had sixteen children, and one of his sons, also James Balfour, was grandfather to the Scottish author Robert Louis Stevenson.

In 1742, Thomas Mylne, the Surveyor of the City of Edinburgh, built a house with gardens on eight acres of land near this powder-mill, just over one mile west of James Balfour's Pilrig House, which he named Powder Hall. This in turn lent its name to that part of the city, and when, in due course, some running grounds were built there they took their name, as was the custom, from their location, and thus they were called the Powderhall Grounds.

In the summer of 1869 a syndicate was formed for the purpose of constructing an athletic grounds in Edinburgh to rival those in London. The syndicate consisted of W. M. Lightbody, and four members of the Bauchope family from Leith, led by Charles R. Bauchope, an amateur sprinter of some repute who claimed to have set a Scottish grass-track record of 10 1/5 for 100 yards. It is certain that at the inaugural Edinburgh University freshman sports in 1866 he won the shot put and pole vault. The other members of the syndicate were R. G. Bauchope, and W. Bauchope, both prominent businessmen in the city, and John Bauchope, a school teacher. It is thought that Lightbody was the principal financial investor in the scheme.

An Edinburgh firm of builders, W. & D. McGregor, had purchased a plot of land that had previously formed part of Thomas Mylne's Powderhall estate, and the syndicate took out a five-year lease on this piece of land where they laid out their running grounds, about one mile to the west of Pilrig House and right on the Water of Leith. The senior Bauchope and Mr Lightbody toured the running grounds of England and Scotland and decided to base their design on the famous grounds at Stamford Bridge in London. The Powderhall Grounds therefore had a cinder track of 440 yards with a sprint straight of 180 yards on the southern side, and a roofed grandstand for 1400 spectators. Much of the materials for this they purchased from the recently defunct Newington grounds at Powburn Toll for the sum of one hundred pounds.

The first meet, called the New Year Pedestrian Gala, was held over three days in January 1870 with three events, a 1-mile handicap won off the scratch mark by John Ridley of Gateshead in the very good time of 4:25. An 880 yards handicap won by J. Watt of Glasgow, and the event that would come to be called the Powderhall Sprint was initiated at 160 yards, the inaugural champion being Dan Wight of Jedburgh, barely nineteen years of age and running off 12 yards. On the day there was no particular reason to suppose that it was anything special, it was just one of a number of professional sprint handicaps held at various distances at a number of different venues that year, and the first edition was just called the 160 yards handicap. It subsequently went by a number of names but mostly it was referred to as either the New Year Sprint Handicap or the Powderhall Sprint. The event was held at Powderhall every New Year (with minor exceptions for wars and such) for the next one hundred years, becoming one of the most famous professional sprint races in the world. The only other serious contender for that crown being the Stawell Gift, held each Easter at Stawell, Victoria, Australia, since 1878. The Powderhall Sprint moved to Edinburgh's Meadowbank Stadium in 1971 and under its new name of the New Year Sprint it continues today at Musselburgh Racecourse.

Edinburgh University Athletic Club started training at Powderhall from as early as March 1871, and in February 1872 held their Spring Athletic Games there.

William M. Lapsley was a keen amateur sportsman from Edinburgh. He was a founding member of St Bernard's F.C., and played as goalkeeper for Hanover F.C., he was a cyclist, and an athlete. At a meeting held by Edinburgh Athletic Club in July 1872 he won the 880 yards handicap, finished third in the 150 yards and was also third in the hammer with a throw of 91 ft 2in (27.80m). He also won the 880 yards at the Piershill Garrison Sports in 1872. In July 1879, Lapsley took a share in the lease for the Royal Patent Gymnasium Ground in Royal Crescent Park, Edinburgh. By draining the adjoining Boyton's Pond he added to the existing football ground an 880 feet circular running path (6 laps to the mile) and a sprint track of 125 yards. There was also a grandstand, similar to but smaller than, that at Powderhall. This had its opening on 19 July 1879 and was obviously in direct competition with the Powderhall Grounds. However, in July 1880 the Bauchope syndicate at the Powderhall Grounds dissolved their company and the grounds were briefly taken over by two gentlemen named Lauder and Hughes, but by January 1883 William Lapsley had taken over the lease for the Powderhall Grounds.

The Scottish AAA was formed in 1883 and held their first championship meeting at the Powderhall Grounds in June of that year. The championships were subsequently held at Powderhall many times, including in 1884, 1886, 1888 and 1910. At the 1890 Scottish Championships at Powderhall, Kenneth Whitton (Edinburgh Harriers) set a Scottish Native and All-comers hammer record of 103 ft 0in (31.40m), beating his own record set at the 1885 championships at Paisley. Athletics continued to be held at Powderhall for the next one hundred years with competition transferring to Meadowbank Stadium in 1971.

== Change of venue ==
In October 1888 the Lord Provost's Committee submitted a report to Edinburgh Town Council recommending that "the ground at Powderhall belonging to the city be taken over from the present tenant and converted into a Public Park from Whitsunday next." William Lapsley, the chief tenant and owner of the Powderhall Grounds, negotiated a three-month extension and the last races run on the original Powderhall Grounds took place on Saturday 25 May 1889, at what had come to be known as the Queen's Birthday meeting. W. Grant of Edinburgh won a 130-yard handicap off 17 yards in 12 1/2 seconds, W. Balmer of Edinburgh won a 300-yard handicap off 37 yards in 30 1/2 seconds, and John D. Henderson of Edinburgh won a 1-mile handicap off 135 yards in 4:19 1/2.

On Wednesday 29 August 1889 Lapsley was granted a warrant at the Dean of Guild Court in Edinburgh authorising him to proceed with the layout of a new running ground at Beaverhall Road, practically adjoining the land recently vacated, and to construct on them two grandstands and changing rooms. The first promotion on these new grounds, called New Powderhall, was the New Year Handicap of 1890 at which J. Jackson of Hawick won the New Year Sprint off 10 yards in 12 3/5 seconds.

William Lapsley died on 28 February 1903 as a result of an accident in a horse drawn cab on his way to a rugby union international between Scotland and Ireland. The driver of the cab lost control of it on a steep hill and the horse bolted and crashed into the basement of a nearby house. Lapsley died at the scene and his wife, though seriously injured, survived. The lease of the Powderhall Grounds was due to expire in May of that year and the trustees appointed to conduct business after his death failed to renew the lease and the grounds were taken over by Mr Frederick Arthur Lumley, a maker of gymnastic apparatus and a boxing instructor. The first meet under this new management was on Wednesday 13 May 1903 when L. Richards of Lanark won a 130 yards handicap off 13 yards in 12 1/5 seconds, and D. Todd of Edinburgh won a 1-mile handicap off 145 yards in 4:21.

After winning the 100 yards at the Edinburgh University sports in May 1921, the Olympian Eric Liddell, portrayed in the film Chariots of Fire, started training at Powderhall under the care of Tommy McKerchar, a printer by trade who coached professional pedestrians on the side. But McKerchar coached Liddell three times a week for free.

Over the next few years professional pedestrianism gradually waned in importance, from regular meets at dozens of grounds around the country there were now apart from Powderhall just those at Blackpool, Morpeth, Cardiff, Pontypridd and Newcastle keeping the sport alive. But decline is a relative term as at the 1907 New Year Handicap 24,000 spectators turned out despite rain having fallen for several hours before the meet commenced. That was the last time that Alexander McKenzie, a paper ruler by profession, acted as starter at Powderhall Grounds, having started there in 1879. His successor as starter was James Lynch who officiated in that capacity until his death in May 1930. In 1920 his son Chris Lynch became the official handicapper at Powderhall.

In June 1904 the Caledonian Whippet Racing Club held a 160 yards handicap, and the following June they held dog races, without any restriction as to breed of dog, for the first time in over twenty years. From this time a series of these promotions were held at regular intervals throughout the season, and as professional sprinting declined these other events gradually assumed a greater importance in the sporting calendar. In 1926 it was observed that there were more bookkeepers at a greyhound racing evening than there were spectators at a pedestrian meeting and the end was clearly in sight. The circular cinder running path was turfed over, a new sprint straight was laid down to serve the needs of the pedestrians at their annual New Year festival, and New Powderhall was converted into a greyhound racing stadium with the first event under the auspices of the Greyhound Racing Association, held on Wednesday 3 August 1927. In 1923 Fred Lumley had exercised his option to purchase the grounds outright, and in 1930 The Greyhound Racing Association Trust purchased the Powderhall Stadium, as it was now called, from Lumley.

== Scottish athletics records ==
Scottish athletics records set at Powderhall
Event	time/dist	Athlete (club)	Meet	Date	Record
100 yards	10 sec	James Cowie (London AC)	Scottish Championship	28 June 1884	SN/AC
100 yards	10 sec	Robin Murdoch (Glasgow Un.)	Scotland vs Ireland	16 July 1932	SN
220 yards	22 4/5	Alfred Downer (Edinburgh H.)	St Bernard's FC Sports	6 July 1893	SN/AC
220 yards	22 2/5	Alfred Downer (Edinburgh Un.)	Edinburgh University Sports	15 July 1895	AC
440 yards	51 1/5	James Cowie (London AC)	Scottish Championship	28 June 1884	SN/AC
880 yards	2:00 3/4	Thomas Moffat (Canada)	Scottish Championship	23 June 1883	AC
880 yards	1:57 3/5	Alfred Tysoe (Skerton H.)	St Bernard's FC Sports	9 July 1898	AC
880 yards	1:59 2/5	Hugh Welsh (Watson's College)	Edinburgh Harriers	10 June 1899	SN
880 yards	1:59.0	Jack Paterson (Watsonians)	Edinburgh Harriers	9 June 1900	SN
880 yards	1:47.8	Charles Mein (Edinburgh H.)	Edinburgh Southern Harriers	20 June 1925	SN
1000 yards	2:17	Fred Bacon (Ashton-under-Lyme H.)	Edinburgh Harriers	24 July 1895	AC
1 mile	4:32 1/5	David S. Duncan (Edinburgh H.)	St Bernard's FC Sports	17 July 1886	AC
1 mile	4:28	David S. Duncan (Edinburgh H.)	Edinburgh Harriers	13 September 1888	SN/AC
1 mile	4:18 1/5	Fred Bacon (Ashton-under-Lyme H.)	Edinburgh Northern Harriers	21 July 1894	AC
1 mile	4:23 3/4	Hugh Welsh (Watson's College)	Watson's College Sports	28 May 1898	SN
2 miles	9:27 2/5	Fred Bacon (Ashton-under-Lyme H.)	Edinburgh Northern Harriers	21 July 1894	AC
3 miles	15:54	Alexander Findlay (Ayr FC)	Scottish Championship	28 June 1886	AC
3 miles	15:37 2/5	William Gabriel (Edinburgh Un.)	Edinburgh Harriers	28 May 1887	AC
3 miles	15:32 4/5	David S. Duncan (Edinburgh H.)	Edinburgh Harriers	19 July 1888	AC
3 miles	15:16 3/5	George Pollard (Edinburgh Un.)	Edinburgh Harriers	14 June 1892	SN
3 miles	15:13 2/5	Andrew Hannah (Clydesdale H.)	Edinburgh Harriers	9 June 1894	SN
3 miles	14:27 2/5	Fred Bacon (Ashton-under-Lyme H.)	Edinburgh Northern Harriers	21 July 1894	AC
4 miles	21:16 3/5	William Gabriel (Edinburgh Un.)	Edinburgh Harriers	29 May 1886	AC
4 miles	19:54 1/5	Sid Thomas (London AC)	St Bernard's FC Sports	6 July 1893	AC
4 miles	20:40	Stewart Duffus (Arbroath H.)	St Bernard's FC Sports	6 July 1893	SN
6 miles	32:12	Alexander Findlay (Ayr FC)	Scottish AAA 10 mile Championship	28 June 1886	AC
6 miles	32:00 4/5	Andrew Hannah (Clydesdale H.)	Scottish AAA 10 mile Championship	2 April 1894	SN/AC
10 miles	55:16 4/5	Alexander Findlay (Ayr FC)	Scottish AAA 10 mile Championship	28 June 1886	AC
10 miles	54:02 3/5	Andrew Hannah (Clydesdale H.)	Scottish AAA 10 mile Championship	2 April 1894	SN/AC
120yd H	16 3/5	Alexander McNeill (Fettes-Loretto)	Scottish Championship	28 June 1884	AC
120yd H	16 1/5	Robert Stronach (Glasgow Academicals)	Scottish Championship	25 June 1904	SN/AC
High jump	6 ft 0 1/2in (1.84m)	R. G. Murray (West of Scotland H.)	Scottish Championship	25 June 1904	SN
Pole vault	11 ft 2 1/2in (3.41m)	E. Latimer Stones (Ulverston AC)	Scottish Championship	23 June 1888	AC
Long jump	22 ft 1in (6.73m)	Hugh Barr (Edinburgh H.)	Scottish Championship	27 June 1896	SN
Long jump	22 ft 3in (6.78m)	Walter Newburn (Ireland)	Scotland vs Ireland	17 July 1897	AC
Long jump	23 ft 2in (7.06m)	Hugh Barr (Edinburgh H.)	Scotland vs Ireland	15 July 1899	SN/AC
Long jump	23 ft 2 1/2in (7.07m)	William Hunter (Edinburgh Un.)	Scottish Championship	27 June 1914	SN
Shot putt	42 ft 8in (13.00m)	Kenneth Whitton (St George's FC)	Edinburgh Bicycle Club	6 June 1885	SN
Shot putt	43 ft 3in (13.18m)	James MacIntosh (West End ARC)	Scottish Championship	27 June 1896	SN
Shot putt	45 ft 10 1/2in (13.98m)	Denis Horgan (Ireland)	Scotland vs Ireland	15 July 1899	AC
Shot putt	45 ft 2in (13.76m)	Tom Kirkwood (Liverpool Scottish Volunteers)	Scottish Championship	23 June 1906	SN
Hammer (9 ft circle)	137 ft 1in (41.78m)	Thomas Kiely (Ireland)	Scotland vs Ireland	17 July 1897	AC
Hammer (9 ft circle)	141 ft 4in (43.08m)	Thomas Kiely (Ireland)	Scotland vs Ireland	15 July 1899	AC
Hammer (9 ft circle)	149 ft 4in (45.52m)	Tom Nicolson (West of Scotland H.)	Scotland vs Ireland	18 July 1903	SN/AC
Hammer (9 ft circle)	154 ft 1 3/4in (46.96m)	Tom Nicolson (West of Scotland H.)	Scottish Championship	25 June 1904	SN/AC

- AC = Scottish All-comers Record
- SN = Scottish Native Record (lived in Scotland for 3 months or more)

== Other sports ==
As well as athletics and walking races, from 1874 the Powderhall Grounds hosted cycle races, known at the time as velocipede races. There were also quoits handicaps and gun clubs held pigeon shooting competitions. In 1876 they started a medley event where competitors had to walk 1 mile, run 1 mile, and ride a horse 1 mile. The best time for this event was 16:22 by Peter McKellar of Edinburgh, well known locally as a champion walker. In April 1877 Jack Keen, a famous London cyclist, had a one-hour race against a team of horses. The horse rider changed horses six times and eventually beat the cyclist by five yards, covering 17 miles in 59:15. The next month, June 1877, Powderhall started a short-lived experiment with hosting trotting races. A special turf track was constructed outside the running path to accommodate the sulkies, and in the first meeting one of the jockeys broke his arm and another was thrown out of his carriage. After a few more mishaps the experiment was halted before anyone died. In August 1878 they presented a wire walking act and held their first dog races, promoted by the Midlothian Dog-Racing Club. The Scottish Cyclists Union was formed in 1880 and celebrated by holding their very first meet at Powderhall. They followed that with a six-day bicycle race held in Waverley Market and Powderhall put on a Grand Horse and Pony Leaping Competition to try and draw in the crowds. But one hundred thousand customers paid to watch the cycle races and the pony show was never repeated.

From 1881, association football began to be staged at Powderhall, and the stadium was the home ground for both Heart of Midlothian and Hibernian Football Clubs prior to Tynecastle Park and Easter Road respectively. In 1882 St Bernard's FC started playing at Powderhall, and both dog racing and cycle races were still regular features of the programme. After the change to the new venue in 1890 cycling continued to be popular, and in 1891 the Edinburgh Highland Society moved their annual Highland Games to Powderhall which included foot races, field events, highland dancing, bagpipe playing competitions and tug-of-war, and in 1898 they added a game of Camanachd, now better known as Shinty.

Scotland have played two rugby union international matches at Powderhall. On Saturday 20 February 1897 Scotland beat Ireland 8-3 and on Saturday 12 March 1898 Scotland drew 3–3 with England.

In 1920 boxing matches were introduced, commencing on Saturday 19 June with an afternoon of running events, 5-a-side football competition, and boxing exhibitions attended by over 13,000 spectators to raise funds for Edinburgh Royal Infirmary. This was repeated in June 1924 with similar success.

Powderhall became the home ground of Leith Athletic from 1926 to 1928 and Edinburgh City from 1931 to 1934. It later became a venue for motorcycle speedway, with the Edinburgh Monarchs racing there from 1977 until 1995.

== Greyhound racing ==
=== Pre WWII history ===
When opened in 1927, the track had easy bends and long straights and over 10,000 attended the first meeting. The first race, the Leith Stakes was won by Eager Hands in 30.70 over 500 yards. The Greyhound Racing Association (GRA) acquired Powderhall becoming one of 19 GRA tracks at the time.

The kennels were built on the west side of the stadium replacing an old football ground and the first trainers were John Snowball, Tom Storey, Arthur Graham, C Hughes and Tommy Johnston (Sr.).

Major success was achieved in 1928 when Boher Ash trained by Tommy Johnston Sr. won the English Greyhound Derby, the first and only time a Scottish trained greyhound would win the sports premier event. The track situated below the 'Puddockie' as it was known locally (the Water of Leith) and a culvert ran under the track to allow the Puddockie to flow. The track circumference was 440 yards and facilities included a grandstand and two covered enclosures. The original hare was an outside 'bogie' and distances were 440, 500 and 700 yards but despite the culvert the track was prone to flooding. Edinburgh hosted four greyhound tracks, Stenhouse Stadium, Marine Gardens and a short lived independent track called Royal Gymnasium. The track introduced its own major event in 1933 and called it the Edinburgh Cup which saw early winners including Jesmond Cutlet, Wattle Bark and Dante II.

=== Post war history ===
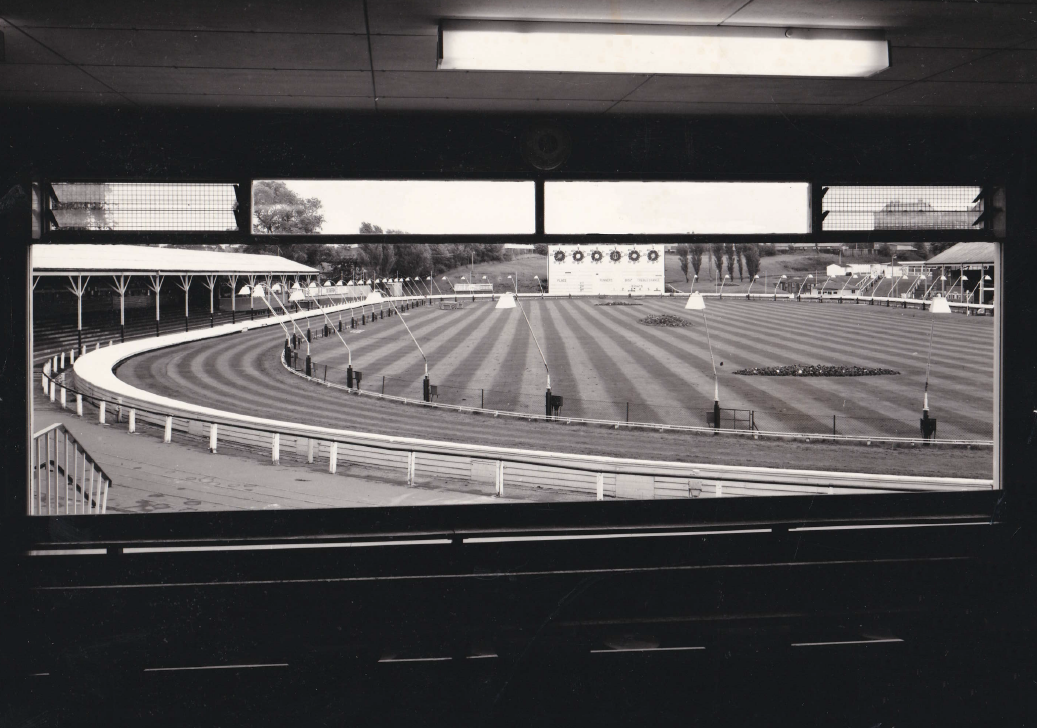
Powderhall Stadium in Edinburgh c.1970

The venue was selected to host the Stewards Cup on several occasions and also hosted the BBC Television Trophy in 1964. In 1970 the stadium underwent renovation including a new 100 'Silver Hound' seated restaurant with a glass plated front to allow public viewing and bar areas increased to a total of seven. Bill Glennie was General Manager and Bill Mulley was Racing Manager replaced by Stuart Strachan in 1978 A heated blanket was constructed underneath the track to combat the Scottish winter and allow racing to go ahead during particularly cold spells.

The Scottish Grand National and Scottish St Leger both became popular events and in 1982 trainer Graham Mann was moved by the GRA to White City and his replacement was Jane Glass, the Scottish tracks first ever female trainer. Powderhall marked its 60th anniversary with a new £400,000 grandstand and in 1987 the track was handed the Scottish Greyhound Derby by the GRA (following problems at Shawfield), the first time the event was run outside of Glasgow.

After hosting the 1988 Scottish Derby the GRA sold the track to local businessman Norrie Rowan for £1.8m, the sale of the track resulted in two problems, the first was that they lost the rights to hold the Scottish Derby because the GRA no longer had any investments in Scotland so the Derby returned to Glasgow. Secondly Norrie Rowan sold the track on to Coral for £2.2 million an instant profit of £400,000. During 1990 Rowan expressed the desire to buy the stadium back.

The locally trained Ravage Again nearly surpassed the Ballyregan Bob world record in 1990; trained by Willie Frew the 29 successive wins sequence came to an end on 26 January 1990.

=== Closure ===
Corals sold the stadium to Eddie Ramsay in 1992 for £3 million but his company SGRC (Scottish Greyhound Racing Company) was in financial difficulties and he sold it to a Channel Islands company called Charlotte Twenty-One (that included a shareholder called Walton Hankinson, a housing development specialist) during January 1995 for £3 million. The stadium closed in 1995 and was demolished for housing.

== Competitions ==
=== Scottish Grand National ===
The Scottish Grand National was a competition held over hurdles from 1954 until the stadium closed.

Year	Winner	Breeding	Trainer	Time	SP
1954	Ruddy Caution	Bahs Choice – Pure Motive	Paddy McEvoy (Private)	28.95	7-2
1955	Prince Lawrence	Dangerous Prince - Knights Romance	Joe Pickering (New Cross)	29.24	5-1
1957	Fodda Champion	Champion Prince - Wimble Lady	Jimmy Jowett (Clapton)	29.04	1-3f
1958	Fodda Champion	Champion Prince - Wimble Lady	Jimmy Jowett (Clapton)	28.74	
1959	Rialto Crown	Imperial Dancer – Quare Princess	Tom Lightfoot (White City)	29.72	10-1
1960	Dawn Dancer	Prince of Bermuda – Peaceful Dancer	Cyril Beaumont (Belle Vue)	29.18	4-9f
1961	Rorys Pleasure	Man of Pleasure – Banri Ordha	Joe Pickering (White City)	28.86	
1962	Barrel Kissane	Champion Prince - Yoblstrap	Barney O'Connor (Walthamstow)	29.11	
1963	Ascot	Carrickaroche Champion – Ash Look	Charlie Smoothy (New Cross)	29.32	
1964	Banba's Son	Champions Son – Darkies Delight	Clare Orton (Wimbledon)	29.42	
1965	Bolshoi Prince	The Grand Prince – Bolshoi Artiste	Norman Oliver (Brough Park)	29.26	
1966	Halfpenny King	Crazy Parachute - The Baw Wee	John Shevlin (New Cross)	29.15	
1967	Cross Champ	The Grand Prince - Anabanana	Alf Eggleston (Leeds)	29.43	
1968	Ballintore Tiger	Prairie Flash – Not Landing	Tim Forster (Harringay)	29.22	
1969	Tonys Friend	Tontine – Maggie From Cork	Randy Singleton (White City)	29.68	4-7f
1970	Derry Palm	O'Leary – Fannie Caesar	Phil Rees Sr. (Wimbledon)	29.17	8-1
1974	Weston Pete	Monalee Champion – New Kashmir	Colin West (White City)	29.29	2-1
1975	Shamrock Blackie	Patricias Hope – Shanlyre Blackie	Tommy Foster (White City)	29.77	33-1
1976	Try It Blackie	Russian Gun – Gurteen Daisy	Frank Melville Harringay)	29.60	2-1jf
1977	Greenane Tyro	Monalee Champion – Fit Me In	Randy Singleton (White City)	29.01	3-1
1978	Topofthetide	Westpark Mint – Lady In Love	Tim Forster Harringay)	29.29	4-9f
1979	Scintillas Rock	Yanka Boy – Scintillas Mini	Frank Melville Harringay)	29.47	4-1
1980	Drakeland Jim	Currans Pad – Arctic Ann	Tommy Foster (White City)	29.21	6-4f
1981	1981 Bobcol	Westpark Mint – Black Katty	Norah McEllistrim (Wimbledon)	29.35	4-5f
1982	Face The Mutt	Mutts Silver – Millroad Cast	Reece (Middlesbrough)	28.99	1-3f
1983	Face The Lads	Luminous Lad – Mill Road Silver	Norah McEllistrim (Wimbledon)	29.00	9-2
1984	Lovely Pud	I'm Lovely – Lucky Una	G Rodgerson (Powderhall)	28.77	6-1
1985	Brendas Luck	Black Coat – Brendas Dream	Ron Bicknell (Milton Keynes)	28.99	5-1
1986	Moneypoint Sam	Liberty Lad – Queens Hotel	Bob Young (Brighton)	28.77	10-1
1987	Cavan Town	Sail On II – Leafy Glade	Mel Cumner (Maidstone)	28.68 TR	8-13f
1988	Kilcuala Prince	Dipmac – Hack Up Hostess	J.J Keane (Private)	29.28	3-1
1989	Skyline Prince	Shesign Rocket – Apache Laura	Linda Mullins (Romford)	28.65	7-2
1990	Gizmo Pasha	Whisper Wishes – If And When	Linda Mullins (Romford)	28.69	1-2f
1991	Deerpark Jim	Oran Jack – Saol Fada Sally	Linda Mullins (Walthamstow)	28.79	6-1
1992	Kildare Slippy	I'm Slippy – Kildare Elm	Paddy Hancox (Hall Green)	28.09	1-4f
1993	Last Years Man	Murlens Slippy – Junior Miss	Tommy Foster (Wimbledon)	28.71	4-1
1994	Heavenly Dream	Whisper Wishes – Sail On Jenny	Linda Mullins (Walthamstow)	28.46	15-8jf

TR (Track record), 1954-1994 (500 yards, 465 metres), 1971-1973 (Not held)

=== Scottish St Leger ===
The Scottish St Leger was a competition held from 1959 until the stadium closed.

Year	Winner	Breeding	Trainer	Time	SP
1959	Greenane Airlines	Imperial Airways – Take Astra	Jim Irving (Private)	39.94	
1960	My Farewell	Demon King – Flirting Girl	Jack Tallantire (Powderhall)	41.16	
1961	Desert Rambler	Champion Prince – Imperial Peg	Joe Booth (Private)	40.27	
1962	Ballymurn Prince	Solar Prince – July Flower	Austin Hiscock (Belle Vue)	40.55	
1963	Strelka	War Dance – Imperial Astra	Jim Irving (Private)	40.47	
1964	Lucky Hi There	Hi There - Olives Bonny	Jimmy Jowett (Clapton)	39.28	
1965	Feakles Wish	Feakles Luck – Oxgrove Dinkie	George Carrigill (Private)	40.95	
1966	Caledonian Peg	Prairie Flash – Caledonian Penny	George Carrigill (Private)	40.63	
1967	Negro Harpist	Oregon Prince - Imperial Astra	Jim Irving (Private)	40.42	
1968	Forward King	Crazy Parachute – Supreme Witch	Ted Brennan (Sheffield)	39.94	11-10f
1969	Greenane Gem	Prairie Flash – Sheila At Last	Bessie Lewis (Private)	40.28	9-4
1970	Peace Blue Boy	Tric Trac – Peace Rose	Stan Mitchell (Belle Vue)	40.60	10-1
1971	Knock Off	Aristos – Last Pot	Harry Bamford (Belle Vue)	39.91	4-5f
1972	Ramdeen Stuart	Sallys Story – Any Streak	Norman Oliver (Brough Park)	40.19	1-2f
1973	Moylisha	Silver Hope – Last Pot	Harry Bamford (Belle Vue)	40.40	8-1
1974	Prince Wong	Supreme Fun – Irene Wong	Janet Tite (Private)	40.87	4-1
1975	Suffer On	Cobbler – No Tour	Rita Hayward (Norton Canes)	40.64	9-4
1976	Cooladine Game	Red Game – Flashy Minnie	Peter Harding (Powderhall)	40.84	6-1
1977	Paradise Spectre	Spectre – Paradise Wonder	Pat Mullins (Private)	40.20	1-3f
1978	Colums Corner	Blessington Boy – Kilnagleary Gift	John Gibbons (Rochester)	40.24	4-7f
1979	Luque	Itsachampion – Strawberry Pearl	Pete Beaumont (Leeds)	40.49	5-1
1980	Navigator	Super Jim – Pilgrims Blow	Pete Beaumont (Leeds)	40.69	20-1
1981	Rath Hero	Brother Orchid – Lady of Love	Gordon Bailey (Yarmouth)	40.70	20-1
1984	Willow Lass	Yellow Band – Brindle Betty	Stewart Loan (Shawfield)	40.41	10-1
1985	My Tootsie	Tough Decision – Jeffs Love	Stewart Loan (Shawfield)	40.54	5-1
1986	Shandon Tiger	Gambling Fever – Shandon Kitten	Bryce Wilson (Powderhall)	40.58	4-9f
1987	Clifton Hill	Ardralla Victory - Queensbury	Stewart Loan (Powderhall)	41.65	20-1
1990	Flicka Dubh	Ballylarkin Star – Idle Kate	Dave Hopper (Sheffield)	41.44	12-1
1991	Time For One	Green Gorse - Elevenses	Michael Power (Yarmouth)	40.33	11-4f
1992	Princeton Blue	Shanagarry Duke – Princeton House	Dave Conway (Private)	40.39	7-2
1993	Greenwell Kit	Lavally Oak – Cahills Gate	John Flaherty (Shawfield)	39.95 TR	4-6f
1994	Droopys Evelyn	Game Ball – Moral Support	Harry Williams (Sunderland)	39.90	6-1

TR (Track record), 1954-1994 (700 yards, 650 metres), 1982-1983 (Not held)

== Track records ==
=== Pre Metric record ===
Distance (yards)	Greyhound	Time	Date	Notes
400	Houghton Spur	24.77	17.08.1968	
440	Telepathy	25.38	05.08.1931	
440	Gold Deposit	25.14	1948	
440	Hellcat Spartan	25.06	15.04.1957	
500	Jesmond Cutlet	28.20	20.09.1937	
500	Kildrid Hero	28.20	1948	
500	Just Fame	27.97	27.08.1958	
500	Pigalle Wonder	=27.97	30.04.1958	TV Trophy heats
500	Shady Pagoda	27.85	17.08.1968	
500	Say Little	27.80	1972	
525	Telepathy	30.40	13.07.1931	
625	Magic Knight		23.05.1966	
625	Outcast Mad	35.60	16.09.1967	
700	Robins Reward	41.15	12.08.1933	
700	Don Gipsey	41.05	1947	
700	Greenane Airlines	40.42	04.07.1959	
700	Lucky Hi There	39.96	11.07.1964	
700	Booked Six	39.84	03.07.1969	Scottish St Leger heats
880	Jersey Beauty	52.50	15.08.1936	
880	Greenane Airlines	51.75	19.09.1959	
880	Boothroyden Larry	51.29	19.09.1964	
880	Poor Mick	50.84	18.09.1967	
940	Grimsby Coastguard	57.25	14.05.1955	
940	April Event	56.12	19.09.1966	
260 H	Molly Munro	15.50	23.09.1933	
500 H	Rich Cream	29.33	30.07.1938	
500 H	Fodda Champion	28.87	07.05.1958	
500 H	Rorys Pleasure	28.64	03.05.1961	
700 H	Dawn Dancer	42.08	17.07.1961	
Chase	Cleos Nephew	29.69	09.05.1959	

=== Post Metric records ===
Distance (metres)	Greyhound	Time	Date	Notes
241	Bray Vale	14.41	30.08.1979	
241	Echo Spark	14.28	28.08.1982	
241	Briarhill Dawn	14.55+	08.08.1987	
241	Yes Super	14.54	03.09.1994	
416	Falcons Astor	25.80	28.06.1975	
465	Tory Mor	27.67	23.08.1975	Edinburgh Cup Final
465	Princes Pal	27.63	29.08.1987	
465	Toms Lodge	27.53	08.1993	
650	Suffer On	40.49	26.06.1975	
650	Paradise Spectre	40.09	22.09.1977	Scottish St Leger heats
650	Ballyregan Bob	39.60	26.04.1986	
650	Carrigeen Bree	40.25+	02.05.1987	
650	Greenwell Kit	39.95	27.03.1993	Scottish St Leger Final
650	Droopys Evelyn	39.54	1993	
824	Portland Dusty	52.23	29.10.1979	
824	Jos Gamble	51.98	22.10.1983	
824	Role of Fame	52.46+	19.10.1987	
824	Manx Jet	52.09	1989	
824	Easy Bimbo	51.43	05.10.1991	Scottish Marathon Final
465 H	Anns Chancer	28.96	19.07.1980	
465 H	Cavan Town	28.68	02.05.1987	Scottish Grand National Final
465 H	Skyline Prince	28.63	06.05.1989	
465 H	Kildare Slippy	28.29	1992	

+ track alterations
