= Elland Road Greyhound Stadium =

Stadium for greyhound racing in the city of Leeds, Yorkshire, England

- Interactive map of Elland Road Greyhound Stadium
- Location: Leeds, West Yorkshire
- Coordinates: 53°46′30″N 1°34′30″W
- Field size: 456 yards

Construction
- Opened: 1927
- Closed: 1982

Tenant
- Greyhound racing

Elland Road Greyhound Stadium also known as Leeds Greyhound Stadium was a greyhound racing stadium in Leeds, West Yorkshire.

The stadium is not to be confused with the football ground Elland Road or Fullerton Park.

== Origins and opening ==
Elland Road football stadium was built in 1897 and thirty years later in 1927 two stadiums were constructed on its west side. The first Fullerton Park was built directly next door to the football stadium on the north side of Elland Road and the second Elland Road Greyhound Stadium was constructed opposite Fullerton Park on the south side of Elland Road.

The stadium opened on Saturday 16 July 1927 and featured racing every Monday, Wednesday and Saturday evening with an additional Saturday matinee at 3.00pm. Races took place over 300, 500 and 750 yards on a circuit with a tight 400 yard circumference. Resident kennels within the stadium grounds numbered 120 and exercise grounds were situated adjacent to the stadium.

== Pre Second World War history ==
A bitter battle took place during 1927 between the Leeds Greyhound Association Ltd (LGA) owners of the Elland Road track and the Greyhound Racing Association (GRA) owners of Fullerton Park which had opened just three months later. The LGA took the GRA to court for false advertising following the public claim by the GRA that they had sole rights of greyhounds chasing electric hares and this upset other companies because it implied that they were the only company allowed to race greyhounds.

The GRA quickly realised that their greyhound stadium being so close to Elland Road stadium would not be able to monopolise trade in the city. This resulted in them closing Fullerton Park to greyhound racing and buying a stake in the LGA. The early 1930s brought about government legislation issues with the totalisator; it would have to be closed down on more than one occasion following questions over the legality of using the system. Despite the issues the track maintained a very healthy business and even introduced professional baseball before the start of the war. Mark Barker the Racing Manager and a Director at Leeds United died in 1943 following illness and the racing was held sporadically during the duration of the war.

== Post Second World War history ==
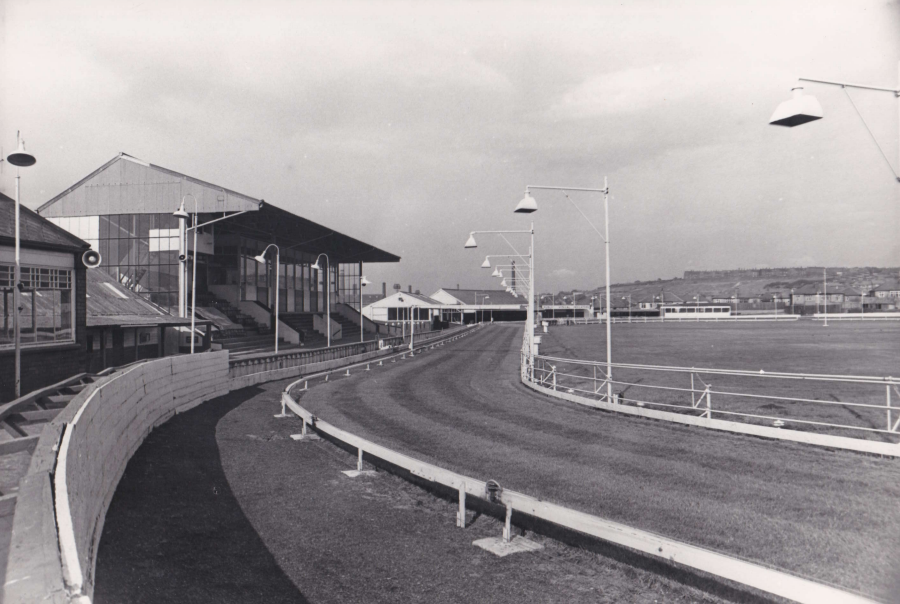
Elland Road Greyhound Stadium c.1950

Following the war business boomed in 1946 with the tote turnover being £1,167,103. The profits enabled the company to upgrade the facilities and Harold Richards was brought in as Racing Manager in the early 1950s. Two competitions were inaugurated; the Ebor Stakes was introduced in 1951 followed by the Yorkshire Two Year Old Produce in 1958.

In the early 1960s Totalisators and Greyhound Holdings (T.G.H) purchased the track and added it to their portfolio of existing tracks. Racing was held on Monday and Saturday evenings and the amenities included five buffet bars, five licensed bars and a restaurant. The hare was an 'Outside Sumner' hare and the resident trainers were Tommy Brown, Joe Kelly, Alf Eggleston and Ann Harrison.

Successful Leeds greyhounds were Lisamote Precept trained by Joe Kelly who won the International, Lincoln and the 1968 Scottish Greyhound Derby, Brilane Clipper won the 1970 Scottish Derby. In 1971 Leeds won the annual Duke of Edinburgh Cup after defeating Clapton Stadium in the final.

During the 1970s Ladbrokes acquired the Totalisators and Greyhound Holdings (T.G.H) group which included the tracks at Brough Park, Crayford & Bexleyheath Stadium, Gosforth, Willenhall and Monmore. The track kennels were demolished in 1979 forcing Tommy Brown and Jim Brennan to retire and Joe Kelly switched to Owlerton; they were replaced by contracted trainers Peter Beaumont, Jim Brown and Ray Andrews.

Between 1973 and 1980 the stadium was the home ground of Hunslet RLFC, the original club's Parkside ground not being available to the new club.

== Closure ==
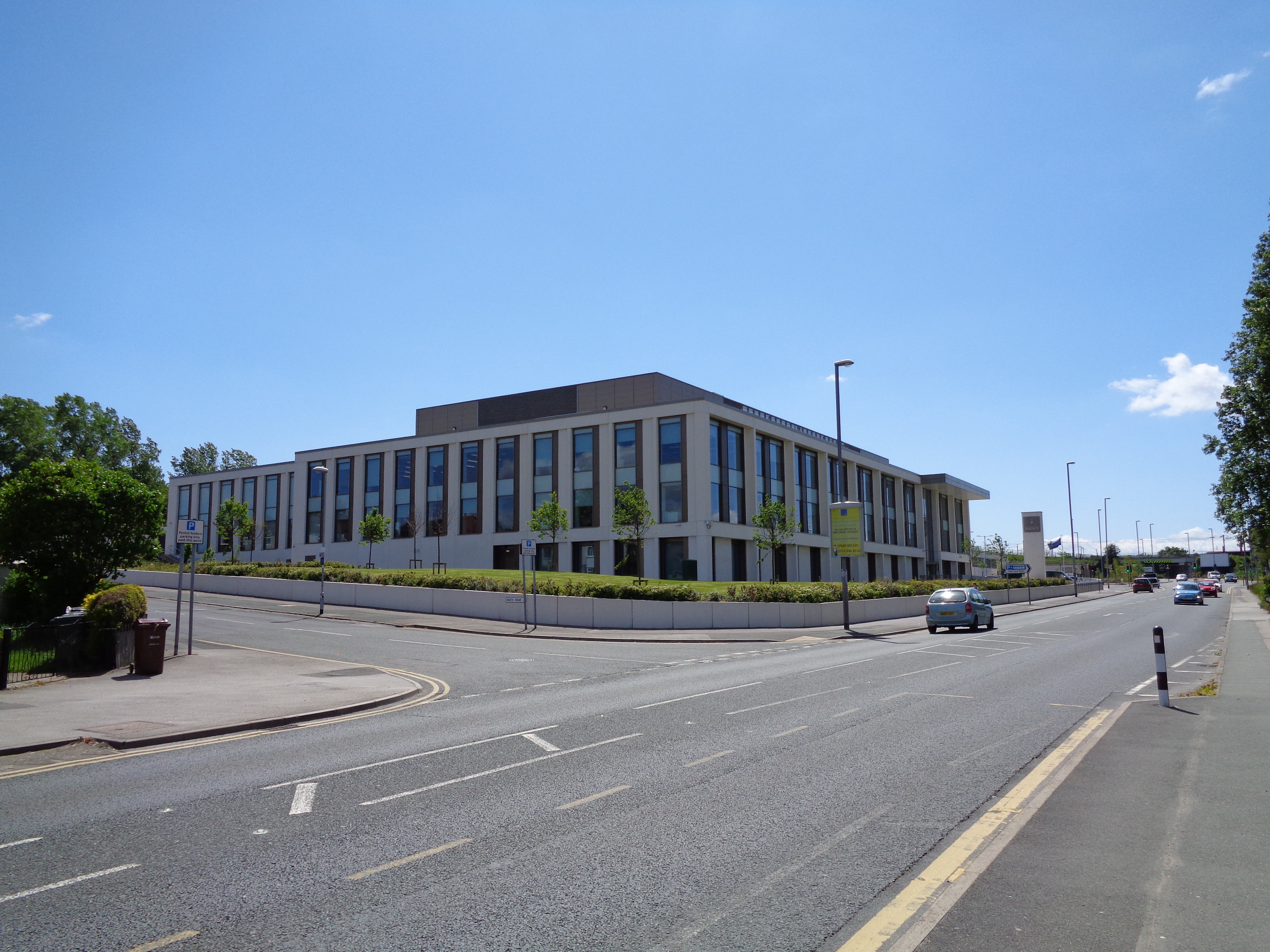
Elland Road police station on the grounds of the former greyhound stadium (2015)

Tim Hale and Derek Bowman replaced Racing Manager Harry Bridger on 1 January 1981 but would only oversee the action for one year because Ladbrokes closed the track. The last meeting was held on 15 March 1982 with the last winner being Mike Supreme. In 2014 the new Leeds District Police HQ opened on the site of the stadium.

== Competitions ==
- Yorkshire Puppy Derby

=== Ebor Stakes ===
The Ebor Stakes was a competition held from 1951 until the stadium closed.

| Year | Winner | Breeding | Trainer | Time | SP |
|---|---|---|---|---|---|
| 1951 | Bearnaburn | | Ron Chamberlain (Private) | 28.88 | |
| 1952 | Richards Choice | Bahs Choice – Gay Primrose | Paddy McEvoy (Private) | 28.46 | 1-1f |
| 1953 | Town Belle | | Ron Chamberlain (Private) | 28.54 | 13-8 |
| 1954 | Rushton Spot | Rushton News - Rushton Panda | Frank Johnson (Private) | 28.73 | 6-4f |
| 1955 | Rushton Spot | Rushton News - Rushton Panda | Frank Johnson (Private) | 28.54 | 4-6f |
| 1959 | Champion Swank | Ballymac Ball - Vandado | Alf Eggleston (Leeds) | 28.51 | 4-9f |
| 1960 | Sufi | Broadway Darkie II - Stylo | John Bassett (Coventry) | 28.58 | 2-1jf |
| 1961 | West Bermuda | Prince of Bermuda – Orelino | Ted Brennan (Sheffield) | 28.67 | |
| 1962 | Cushmine Snob | Racing Snob – Rolling Tide | A.Dryhurst (Darnall) | 28.82 | |
| 1963 | Super Car | Glittering Coin – Tansys Daughter | Norman Oliver (Brough Park) | 28.27 | |
| 1964 | Autumn Twilight | The Grand Canal – Rosegarland Lass | Ted Brennan (Sheffield) | 28.54 | 5-1 |
| 1965 | Batchelor Pays | Jockeys Glen – Bleville Lass | Norman Oliver (Brough Park) | 28.40 | |
| 1966 | Stately Boy | Knockrour Again – Little Margo | George Gooch (Preston) | 28.45 | |
| 1967 | Union Cert | Jerpoint Prince – Scottish Welcome | W.Fletcher (Bradford) | 28.53 | |
| 1968 | Shady Pagoda | Crazy Parachute – Shady Contempera | Norman Oliver (Brough Park) | 28.07 | |
| 1970 | Colonel Imp | Booked Out – Hi Gracie | Barbara Tompkins (Private) | 37.27 | 16-1 |
| 1972 | Dramatic Ace | Yanka Boy – Sheilas Prize | Ted Brennan (Sheffield) | 37.92 | 7-1 |
| 1973 | Pit Lamp | Booked Out – Ballingaddy Fly | Norman Oliver (Brough Park) | 36.95 | 4-7f |
| 1974 | Black Caprice | Supreme Fun – Funny Flash | Jimmy Smith (Brough Park) | 37.52 | 1-1f |
| 1975 | Star Port | Irish Airport – Love A Lassie | Paddy Milligan (Private) | 37.08 | |
| 1976 | Ardbeg Star | Ballyseedy Star – Betsys Flash | Andy Agnew (Perry Barr) | 40.27 | 6-1 |
| 1977 | Kinards Cross | Monalee Champion – Tetty Bowe | Ken Reynolds (Wolverhampton) | 39.98 | 5-1 |
| 1978 | Be Splendid | Cragville Jet – Melodic Theme | Jim Brennan (Leeds) | 40.94 | |
| 1979 | Lime Lane | Mortor Light – Lemon Prize | Pete Beaumont (Leeds) | 40.63 | |
| 1980 | Tory Kotty | Tory Snowball – Monalee Sunset | | 41.85 | |
| 1981 | Lois Lane | Tullig Rambler – Misty Kilbeg | Terry Munslow (Derby) | 41.02 | 11-4 |
| 1982 | Hopalong Dandy | Linacre – Hopalong Millie | Christine Lawlor (Sheffield) | 39.76 | 7-2 |

- 1951-1968 (500 yards), 1956-1958 (not held), 1970-1974 (650 yards), 1975-1976 (600 metres), 1977-1981 (650 metres), 1982-1982 (held at Owlerton)

=== Yorkshire Two-Year Old Produce Stakes ===
| Year | Winner | Breeding | Trainer | Time | SP |
|---|---|---|---|---|---|
| 1958 | Beaurepaire Reject | Magourna Reject – Rimmells Pearl | Jim Hookway (Owlerton) | 28.75 | |
| 1959 | Canadian Crawler | Rushton Spot – Gentle Flame | Jim Hookway (Owlerton) | 28.67 | 4-6f |
| 1960 | Waldorf Flame | The Grand Fire – Local Brunette | Jimmy Jowett (Clapton) | 28.87 | 7-2 |
| 1961 | Old Berry Silver | Ardskeagh Ville - Skylark | Jack Toseland (Perry Barr) | 28.42 | |
| 1962 | Spartan Sacrifice | Ford Spartan – Madam Riche | Ted Brennan (Owlerton) | 28.82 | |
| 1963 | Burniston Boy | First Prize – Burniston Beauty | P.Goodison (Bradford) | 28.68 | |
| 1964 | Konig Seiger | Low Pressure – Dark Knight | Len Bane (Kings Heath) | 28.03 | 8-1 |
| 1965 | Batchelor Pays | Jockeys Glen – Belville Lass | Norman Oliver (Brough Park) | 28.32 | |
| 1966 | Ryedale Owl | Chubbys Choice – Printing Rosedale | Harry Bidwell (Owlerton) | 28.71 | |
| 1967 | Sutton Valley | Wonder Valley – Peace Sprite | Colin McNally (Perry Barr) | 28.02 | |
| 1968 | Whistling Rusty | Pigalle Wonder – Whistling Duchess | Jim Hookway (Owlerton) | 28.52 | |
| 1969 | Rum Club | Maryville Hi – Lindsay Sue | Gordon Hodson (White City) | 29.02 | 7-2 |

(1958-1969 500 yards)

== Track records ==
| Distance yards | Greyhound | Time | Date |
|---|---|---|---|
| 325 | Celtic Chief | 18.16 | 17 March 1945 |
| 325 | Hepicoleum | 17.95 | 28 June 1947 |
| 500 | Flinstone | 28.01 | 20 June 1964 |
| 500 | Fly Dazzler | 27.92 | 1972 |
| 500 | Princess Quail | 27.92 | 1972 |
| 512 | Chatterton | 29.04 | 1947 |
| 512 | Cheerful Comedy | 28.75 | 25.10.1947 |
| 650 | Marvellous City | 37.40 | 17.05.1965 |
| 650 | Elland Rumba | 37.10 | 1970 |
| 650 | Passing Look | 36.98 | 1968 |
| 650 | Shady Pagoda | 36.85 | 1972 |
| 700 | Western Stream | | 1954 |
| 700 | The Cherry Tree | 40.36 | 23.06.1960 |
| 700 | Passing Look | 40.17 | 1968 |
| 700 | Gleneagle Comedy | 40.16 | 1972 |
| 743 | All Out | 44.02 | 1947 |
| 743 | Paddy the Gag | 43.84 | 10.11.1948 |
| 880 | Claudyne | | 23.05.1966 |
| 880 | Miss Thorn | 51.95 | 1970 |
| 500 H | High St Boy | 28.95 | 1970 |
| 512 H | Kyle Champion | 30.53 | 02.06.1945 |
