= Fullerton Park =

Stadium in Leeds, England, 1927–1938

- Location: Leeds, West Yorkshire
- Coordinates: 53°46′37″N 1°34′32″W
- Opened: 1927
- Closed: 1938

Fullerton Park was a former speedway and greyhound track in Leeds.

== Origins and Opening ==
Fullerton Park Stadium originally known as 'The Kennels' was constructed by the Greyhound Racing Association (GRA) in 1927 and opened just three months after the Elland Road Greyhound Stadium; it was located on the opposite side (north side) of the Elland Road. The opening night was on Tuesday 4 October 1927 with gates opening at 6.30pm and a first race time of 7.30pm. The public were able to reserve boxes in the grandstand to view the racing, an incentive used in an attempt to rival the Elland Road Greyhound Stadium which was run by the Leeds Greyhound Association Ltd (LGA). The popular rings were able to accommodate 30,000 spectators.

The initial greyhound trials featured not only Leeds greyhounds but also greyhounds from the new Greenfield Stadium, Bradford because their hare had not yet been installed there. Four licensed trainers took up residence looking after 100 greyhounds in the resident kennels on site made up from runners sent from other GRA tracks at Edinburgh, Manchester, Liverpool, White City and Harringay.

The new general manager was Captain McNaughton and the Racing Manager was George Malcaster and racing was planned for Tuesday, Friday and Saturday nights. Permits had been issued to 127 on course bookmakers issued as follows – the 10s and 5s Tattersall's ring (25), the 2s 4d enclosure (20), the 1s 4d enclosure (82).

== Controversy & Greyhound racing closure ==
A bitter battle took place during 1927 between the Greyhound Racing Association (GRA) owners of Fullerton Park and the Leeds Greyhound Association Ltd (LGA) owners of the Elland Road track. The LGA took the GRA to court for false advertising following the public claim by the GRA that they had sole rights of greyhounds chasing electric hares and this upset other companies because it implied that they were the only company allowed to race greyhounds.

The GRA quickly realised that with their greyhound stadium being so close to Elland Road stadium they would not be able to monopolise trade in the city. This resulted in the closing of Fullerton Park to greyhound racing and the GRA buying a stake in the LGA. The last meeting was held on 30 April 1928.

== Speedway ==
The empty stadium soon had speedway when promoters acquired an option from the GRA. The grass greyhound circuit was dug up and widened for the dirt track. The first meeting was held on 13 October 1928.

The speedway continued for another ten years until 1938 when it closed.

== Closure ==
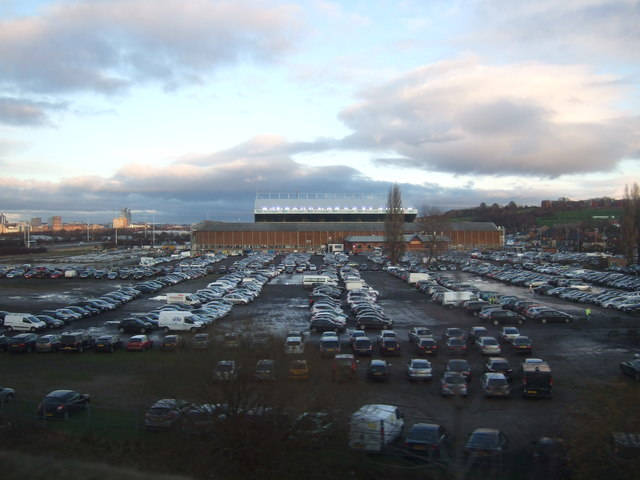
Elland Road car park, site of the former racing track

The stadium closed in 1938 and was later demolished; today the site is a car park for the Elland Road football stadium.
