= 1968 English Greyhound Derby =

- Location: White City Stadium
- Start date: 8 June
- End date: 22 June
- Total prize money: £7,252 (winner)

The 1968 Greyhound Derby took place during June with the final being held on 22 June 1968 at White City Stadium. The winner was Camira Flash and the winning owner Prince Philip, Duke of Edinburgh received £7,252.

== Final result ==
At White City (over 525 yards):

Position	Name of Greyhound	Breeding	Trap	SP	Time	Trainer
1st	Camira Flash	Prairie Flash - Duet Fire	4	100-8	28.89	Randy Singleton (White City - London)
2nd	Witches Smoke	Wonder Valley - Witches Hand	2	100-7	28.95	Phil Rees Sr. (Wimbledon)
3rd	El Campo	Swift Wonder - Miss Bentley	6	13-2	28.98	Jim Irving (Private)
4th	Shady Parachute	Crazy Parachute - Shady Contempara	5	4-6f	29.16	Phil Rees Sr. (Wimbledon)
5th	Shady Begonia	Pigalle Wonder - Castle Swan	1	6-1	29.34	Norman Oliver (Brough Park)
6th	Winning Hope	Solar Prince - Millie Hawthorn	3	7-2	29.35	Paddy Keane (Clapton)

=== Distances ===
1, neck, 3, 3, short head (lengths)
The distances between the greyhounds are in finishing order and shown in lengths. From 1950 one length was equal to 0.08 of one second.

== Competition Report ==
Yellow Printer, a red fawn dog by Printers Prince out of Yellow Streak was installed as one of the shortest ante-post favourite in the history of the Derby. Other leading entries included Shady Parachute, a finalist the previous year, and Camira Flash, owned by Prince Philip, Duke of Edinburgh.

Yellow Printer set a new track record in qualifying during heat 14 when recording 28.30 sec at White City but he was nearly eliminated in the first round after finding trouble but he just got up to take the third qualifying spot. Camira Flash and Shady Parachute both won and the fastest first round winner was El Campo in 28.76 sec.

The quarter-finals provided a shock as Yellow Printer went out in the most unfortunate circumstances when being knocked over at the third bend. The first semi-final saw Shady Parachute win in 28.62, five lengths clear of Winning Hope and Shady Begonia and become favourite for the event. The second semi-final produced drama at the third and fourth bends when the leading greyhounds slowed due to fighting which allowed Witches Smoke and El Campo to come from behind and take final places. Not Flashing, trained by Irishman Frank Cavlan, finished third relegating the royal dog Camira Flash to fourth and out of the competition. However, the stewards disqualified Not Flashing for fighting, which allowed Camira Flash to progress to the decider.

In the final the royal dog Camira Flash showed first from El Campo and they battled right up to the fourth bend before El Campo lost ground to Camira Flash. Witches Smoke finished well to take the runners up spot and Shady Parachute after missing the break and ran poorly.

== See also ==
- 1968 UK & Ireland Greyhound Racing Year
