= 1972 Irish Greyhound Derby =

- Venue: Shelbourne Park
- Location: Dublin
- End date: 19 July
- Total prize money: £5,000 (winner)

The 1972 Irish Greyhound Derby took place during June and July with the final being held at Shelbourne Park in Dublin on 19 July 1972.

The winner Catsrock Daisy won £5,000 and was trained by Gay McKenna, owned by Matt Bruton & Cyril Scotland and bred by Mrs Ann Relis. The competition was sponsored by Carrolls.

== Final result ==
At Shelbourne, 19 July (over 525 yards):

Position	Winner	Breeding	Trap	SP	Time	Trainer
1st	Catsrock Daisy	Fantastic Prince - Truly Silver	4	1-1f	29.20	Gay McKenna
2nd	Waggy Champion	Maryville Hi - No Tea	5	25-1	29.23	John Reilly
3rd	Agememnon	The Grand Silver - Pride of Corrin	3	5-1	29.26	Michael Kelleher
4th	Butlers Glen	Newdown Prince - Northern Duchess	1	5-1		Michael Farrell
5th	Ballykilty	Always Proud - Kitty True	2	9-4		Ger McKenna
N/R	Bedehust	Myross Again - Boreen Dearg	6			Dicky Myles

=== Distances ===
Neck, neck (lengths)

== Competition Report ==
Gay McKenna of Dublin had already secured three Irish Derby titles when he sent a team to the 1972 event, in an attempt to emulate his brother in law Tom Lynch, and secure a fourth crown. Two bitches called Congress Daisy and Catsrock Daisy were considered serious contenders for McKenna and would provide the opposition for English raider Suburban Gent, double St Leger champion Time Up Please, Itsachampion and the previous year's finalists Gahans Wood and Butlers Glen.

In the first round Congress Daisy recorded the fastest time of 29.15 closely followed by other winners Moordyk Sandy (29.18), Bedhust (29.20) and Eighthouses (29.20). In round two Catsrock Daisy (the recent Easter Cup winner when trained by Sammy Easton) set the best time of 29.04. Congress Daisy recorded 29.11 and Ballykilty won in 29.18.

In the first semi-final Ballykilty beat Agamemnon in 29.14 but the old campaigner Kerryman (who was unbeaten going into the semis) failed to make the final again. Bedehust beat Catsrock Daisy in the second semi to remain unbeaten whilst a third race that was marred by trouble, ended with victory for Butlers Glen from Waggy Champion. In the third semi both Time Up Please and Congress Daisy were surprise eliminations.

The undefeated Bedhust was found to be lame and was withdrawn from the final which left Catsrock Daisy as the even money favourite and duly wrapped up that fourth title for McKenna. She broke well from the traps and maintained a lead all the way. Waggy Champion finished strongly to finish second and only lose by a neck. Catsrock Daisy was found to have broken a toe following the victory.

== See also ==
- 1972 UK & Ireland Greyhound Racing Year
