= Greyhound Racing Association =

British private stadia management company

Greyhound Racing Association (Later GRA)
- Industry: Stadia management
- Founded: August 1925
- Founders: Charles A. Munn; Brigadier-Gen Alfred Critchley; Major L Lyne Dixson; Sir William Gentle
- Defunct: October 2019
- Headquarters: United Kingdom

The Greyhound Racing Association was a UK-based private company founded in 1925 and existed until 2019. It was involved in the management of sports venues, notably greyhound racing stadia. The GRA was responsible for introducing Greyhound racing in the United Kingdom and was the largest racing operator for 70 years but diminished when trading as GRA Acquisition from 2005 to 2019. Despite its name, it was not involved in the administration of greyhound racing itself.

== History ==
=== Early racing history ===
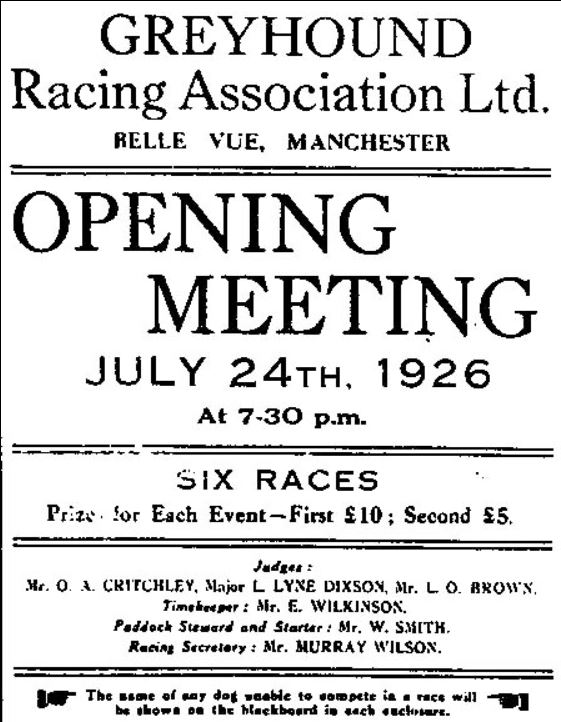
The first meeting

Greyhound racing was developed from coursing in 18th-century Britain. The first official coursing club was the Swaffham Coursing Society in Norfolk, England, which put on its first event in 1776.

Modern greyhound racing was effectively developed by Owen Patrick Smith, the chamber of commerce director in Hot Springs, South Dakota in the early years of the 20th century. He had been involved in organising local coursing events but did not like the sport, which he felt was inhumane. He began to look for a way to make the sport less bloody by using an artificial lure.

After much trial and error, Smith attracted investors and perfected an artificial lure system in 1912. His tracks allowed for six greyhounds to race at a time, and were circular instead of straight. Although it took some time for the concept to be fully developed and put into practice, by the 1920s, his greyhound racing tracks were spread across the USA and attracted thousands of visitors.

=== Formation of GRA ===
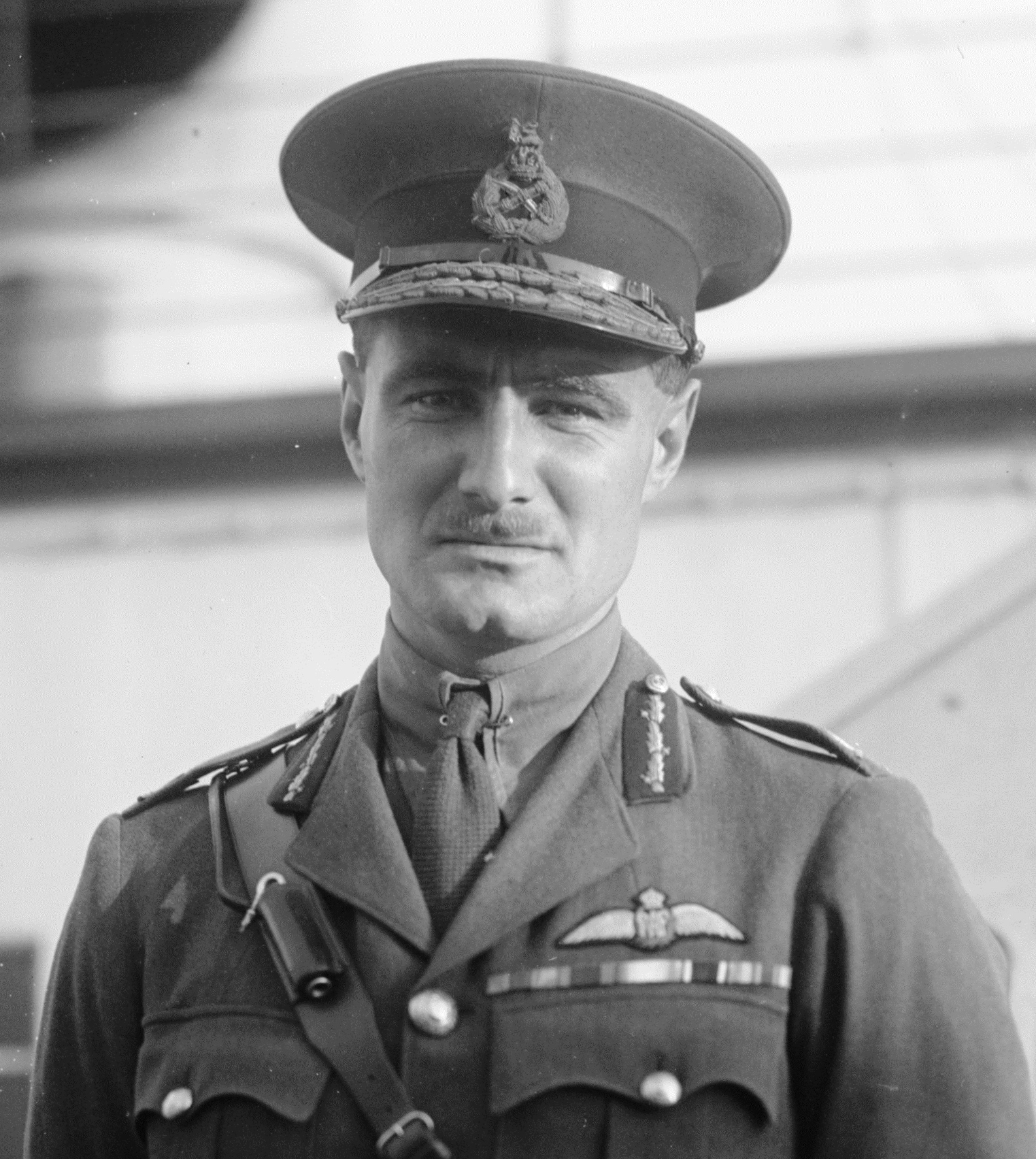
Alfred Critchley

Modern greyhound racing was developed in England by the GRA. American businessman Charles A. Munn had secured the rights from Smith for artificial-lure racing in England in the early 1920s. With three others - Brigadier-General Alfred Critchley, a Canadian-born World War I flying veteran, Major L Lyne Dixson, a noted coursing judge; and Sir William Gentle, a retired chief constable (Note: Gentle was also chairman of the neighbouring Belle Vue Zoological Gardens.) - he formed the Greyhound Racing Association Trust Ltd in August 1925. Although Gentle was the first company chairman, it was Critchley who took control of the company as managing director, and provided the energy and vision to drive it forward. The other directors were Robert Grant Jr., Francis Steward Gentle, F A Lumley, Henry Haworth Hardman and Charles A Munn.

The North West of England was chosen to introduce the sport to the country, most likely hoping that the area's coursing tradition would make it attractive to the local population. On 14 October 1925 the association took a seven-year lease on land at the northern end of Kirkmanshulme Lane (an old brickfield), Manchester at an annual rent of £276, leased from the adjacent Belle Vue Zoological Gardens. With capital of £22,000, £8,000 of which was borrowed, Belle Vue Stadium was built on the land. The stadium opened on 27 July. Although the attendance at the first meeting was disappointing, by the end of the first season in October, thirty seven meetings had been held, with an average attendance of 11,000.

=== UK expansion ===
In 1927, greyhound racing was taken to London with the acquisition of the near-derelict White City Stadium. GRA also moved its headquarters from Belle Vue to White City at the same time.

The GRA financed its activities by employing the then sophisticated automatic totalisator betting system developed by the British-born but long time Australian resident (the concept of Australian citizenship does date earlier than from the 1970s) George Alfred Julius.

The company's sophisticated commercial structure was quickly evident. From the earliest a complex set of subsidiaries and joint holdings characterised the company structure. The ownership of the Belle Vue track was actually in the hands of a subsidiary, Greyhound Racing Trust (Manchester) Ltd. In many cases Critchley and his co-directors owned a controlling or significant interest in these subsidiaries.

By the end of 1927 the company had acquired an interest in 18 racing tracks. Its relationship to many of these tracks was affiliation, rather than full ownership. Nonetheless, in November 1927, just two years after the company was formed they were able to report that 4,500,000 people had passed through their turnstiles giving gross receipts of £500,000. In the same month the company was approaching its shareholders with plans to take the company public. To effect this plan a new entity, The Greyhound Racing Trust Ltd, was formed. Whilst Critchley and Munn were still directors of this new company, Lyne Dixson no longer featured and Gentle had been replaced by Major General, the Lord Loch, as chairman. The new company issued its prospectus in December of the same year.

Diversification also came quite early in the company's history as they quickly adapted their venues for use as speedway tracks. In 1936 it diversified further by acquiring land next to its stadium in Harringay, north London and building the short-lived Harringay Arena.

The first major challenge for the company came with the Betting and Lotteries Act 1934, which stipulated that greyhound tracks must plan their programme a year in advance and hold no more than 104 meeting a year (two a week). It also required that tracks in the same neighbourhood must hold their meetings on the same evening.

Nonetheless, given the novelty of the sport the GRA, and the industry in general, was able to weather both this and the disruption brought about by World War II. During 1942, Alfred Critchley became the Chairman in place of the late Edward Loch, 2nd Baron Loch.

=== Post-war development ===
The popularity of greyhound racing boomed in the post-war years, with 25 million people passing through the turnstiles nationwide each year. The sport peaked in 1946, with White City alone recording a turnover of £17,576,190.

The 1960 Betting and Gaming Act heralded the end of the sport's popularity. The Act allowed alternatives to track-betting including bingo halls, casinos and betting shops. The development of high street betting meant that people could now bet without having to visit tracks. The Act also subjected greyhound track operators and the Greyhound Tote to much higher tax rates than betting shops.

By the end of the decade attendances had declined to 10 million visitors a year. Although this meant that greyhound racing was still the country's second most popular sport after football, it was a dramatic decline on attendances after the war. In 1957 Laddie Lucas became the Managing Director of replacing Francis Gentle who remained as Chairman of the company.

Presaged by the sale of the Harringay Arena in 1958, the company soon moved to support it share price in the face of falling attendance by focusing the market on the value of its property portfolio. In 1965 John Sutton became Managing Director and the GRA extended its board by adding Major Percy Brown, John Cearns (son of WJ Cearns) and Charles Chandler Jr. to the directors but sold the Kingsfurze breeding establishment at Naas in County Kildare, the seven acre grounds had been breeding greyhounds for over 17 years. They then sold Upper Childown Farm and Fan Court Farm grounds in Longcross near Chertsey. The two properties were used as a nursery and rearing establishment by the GRA. Further cutbacks by the GRA included the sacking of two advertising executives and five trainers from the Hook Estate and Kennels.

In mid 1969 it traded as the 'Greyhound Racing Property Trust'. This move, together with a contemporaneous improvement of tax conditions for the industry by Chancellor Jim Callaghan, saw the GRA's share price improve dramatically. The GRA's strategy was to buy up tracks which raised the value of the company's stock and to sell when the price of property boomed. They sold six tracks from 1970-1974 (Charlton, Kings Heath, West Ham, Reading, Liverpool and Clapton) and had previously agreed the sale of their flagship track White City. Foreseeing that industry rationalisation would be required, the company embarked on a strategy that would allow them to control this phase, buying up competing tracks. As part of this spate of buying, in March 1972, GRA Property Trust acquired Wimbledon Stadium, later its flagship venue.

Despite the track sales the company secured various loans and also began to apply for planning permission of some of its London sites to secure their development value. However, a slump in the property market caused shares in property companies to free-fall. At the beginning of 1975 GRA Property Trust was suspended from the Stock Exchange following news of debts said to be in the region of £20 million. The management of the company during this period was inept, the assets were sold but they still accumulated debts of £18.4 million. A scheme of arrangement was organised in 1976 in order to avoid liquidation. They then sold their third share in Walthamstow and their 23% stake in Coral.

The company survived in part through 1980s sale of a number of leading GRA venues, including White City, Slough, Shawfield, Harringay, and Powderhall. In 1987 GRA was the subject of a £68.5 million reverse takeover by Wembley Stadium. Wembley assumed control of GRA and in February 1988 the GRA Group was renamed Wembley plc. The company went through a period of reorganisation and modernisation during the 1990s, and in 1998 GRA purchased Oxford Stadium. 2003 saw the lease acquisition of another new track, Perry Barr Stadium, in north Birmingham. At the same time the Catford Stadium track was closed. Wembley Plc sold the GRA to Risk Capital Partners in 2005 and later traded as GRA Acquisition Ltd.

== Stadiums ==
=== Stadiums owned / operated by the GRA ===
The list shows all tracks that have been owned and operated by the Greyhound Racing Association since greyhound racing commenced in 1926 until 2019.

- Belle Vue Stadium, Manchester (1926–2019)
- Brough Park, Newcastle (1927–1964)
- Catford Stadium, London (1963–2003)
- Charlton Stadium, London (1967–1971)
- Clapton Stadium, London (1966–1974)
- Fullerton Park, Leeds (1927–1928)
- Hall Green Stadium, Birmingham (1927–2017)
- Harringay Stadium, London (1927–1987)
- Kings Heath Stadium, Birmingham (1970–1971)
- Marine Gardens, Edinburgh (1931–1936)
- New Cross Stadium, London (1938–1969)
- Oxford Stadium, Oxford (1999–2012)
- Perry Barr Stadium, Birmingham (2005–2019)
- Portsmouth Greyhound Track, Portsmouth (1928–1930)
- Portsmouth Stadium, Portsmouth (1972–2008)
- Powderhall Stadium, Edinburgh (1927–1988)
- Reading Stadium, Reading (1966–1973)
- Shawfield Stadium, Glasgow (1975–1986)
- Slough Stadium, Slough (1966–1987)
- Stamford Bridge Stadium, London (1933–1968)
- Stanley Stadium, Liverpool (1927–1928)
- Stenhouse Stadium, Edinburgh (1935–1951)
- Vicarage Road, Watford (1974–1978)
- Wembley Stadium, London (1987–1998)
- West Ham Stadium, London (1966–1972)
- White City Stadium, Cardiff (1928–1937)
- White City Stadium, Liverpool (1972–1973)
- White City Stadium, London (1927–1984)
- White City Stadium, Manchester (1930–1982)
- Wimbledon Stadium, London (1972–2017)

=== Stadiums which the GRA held a financial stake in ===
The following is a list of tracks that were not fully owned or operated by the Greyhound Racing Association, but which the GRA still held a financial stake in at some point during their history.

- Brighton & Hove Stadium, Brighton and Hove (1927–1939)
- Greenfield Stadium, Bradford (1927–1939)
- Pennycross Stadium, Plymouth (1927–1939)
- Athletic Ground, Stoke-on-Trent (1927–1939)
- Elland Road Stadium, Leeds (1928–1939)
- Leicester Stadium, Leicester (1927–1939)
- Ramsgate Stadium, Ramsgate (1927–1939)
- Walthamstow Stadium, London (1945–1977)
- White City Stadium, Newcastle (1927–1939)
- White City Stadium, Nottingham (1927–1939)

== Takeover and decline ==
In 2005 GRA Ltd was sold by Wembley PLC to venture capitalists Risk Capital Partners Ltd for £50 million, GRA retained its name with Clive Feltham as Managing Director. though it later emerged that the purchase was part-financed by property developer Galliard Homes.

The sale resulted in speculation that GRA could cease to operate as a greyhound stadium operator, with stadia sold off or closed. In 2009 the Portsmouth Stadium track was sold by Risk Capital to pay down the takeover debt; it closed early the following year. Takeover debt and loan problems continued. During 2012 the GRA closed Oxford, in 2017 Wimbledon and Hall Green closed, on 25 March and on 29 July, respectively.

== Demise ==
During October 2019 Clive Feltham's GRA Acquisition sold the lease they held on the remaining two stadiums Belle Vue and Perry Barr to Arena Racing Company bringing their stadia operations to an end.

== Notes and references ==
Notes

Sources

- Nicholls, Robert (1992). The Belle Vue Story. Manchester: Neil Richardson. ISBN 1-85216-070-5.
- Greyhound Racing Association
- Ticher, Mike (2002). The Story of Harringay Stadium and Arena. Hornsey Historical Society. ISBN 0-905794-29-X.
