= Preston Greyhound Stadium =

Sports venue in the UK

- Interactive map of Preston Greyhound Stadium
- Location: Acregate Lane, Preston
- Coordinates: 53°46′01″N 2°40′19″W

Construction
- Opened: 1932
- Closed: 1988

Preston Greyhound Stadium was a greyhound racing stadium in Acregate Lane, east of Preston, Lancashire, England.

== Origins ==
A company called the Preston Greyhound Racing Association had employed a local labour force to build and run a new greyhound stadium situated in the Ribbleton Ward in east Preston. The site chosen was partly on a recreation ground next door to the 1914 built Waverley Park Cotton Mill (the last cotton mill to be built in Preston). The track, which was on the south side of houses on Miller Road, was accessed from Acregate Lane.

Racing was planned for every Monday, Wednesday, Friday and Saturday evenings; this was common practice at the time, and was before a restriction was introduced as to which nights tracks were allowed to race. The paddock and racing kennels were literally constructed next door to houses in Oxley Road, which must have been very noisy for the residents during racing. The greyhounds would only be housed during racing, with the resident kennels situated on a 26-acre site called Sykes Holt in the village of Mellor Brook six miles to the east. There were 100 kennels with the addition of rest kennels and exercising accommodation.

== Opening ==
The opening meeting took place on Thursday 5 May 1932 under National Greyhound Racing Club rules. Sir Meyrick Hollins, the high sheriff of Lancashire and chairman of Preston North End F.C., officially declared the stadium open. The first winner that night was Quaker Prince over 527 yards in a time of 32.33 secs watched by an estimated crowd of 7,000.

== Early history ==
In 1933 the Preston Greyhound Racing Association opened a second track called Derby Greyhound Stadium. Despite the Great Depression, greyhound racing was financially successful.

E Harrison became the racing manager in the early 1950s and would remain in the position for twenty years.

== 1960s ==
During the 1960s the George Gooch trained Stately Boy claimed both the Ebor Stakes and Lincoln competitions, and kennelmate Greenane Token won the Midland Flat trophy. The only other trainer attached to Preston at the time was Bill Keenan.

Racing was now restricted to licensed race days. Preston raced every Thursday and Saturday at 7.15pm, with the feature annual event being the Lancashire Puppy Championship. R W Payne, former White City, Manchester racing manager, joined the track as general manager and joint-racing manager.

== 1970s ==
In 1971 Jack Hurt joined the training ranks that would increase and consist of Farringdon, Humphreys, Mengala and Mercer.

In 1972 there was a major fire, which resulted in serious damage to the main stand and required a significant rebuild.

Sister track Derby suffered a shortage of dogs in 1976 ,which resulted in the Preston trainers supplying greyhounds for the track. In May 1978 Preston itself was suffering from financial troubles and was forced to close but would re-open the same year under independent rules (unaffiliated to a governing body).

== 1980s ==
The track remained independent for ten years, offering a significant prize of £2,500 to the winner of the annual Preston Derby.

The owner, Frank Boyle, brought in Peter O'Dowd as general and racing manager.

== Closure ==
The ownership of the track switched to David Webb, who then sold the track for housing.

By coincidence, former sister track Derby also closed in 1988.

The last meeting was held at Preston on 3 December 1988, and today the stadium site would be found where the housing exists on Canterbury Road and Harling Road.

== Track records ==
Distance yards	Greyhound	Time	Date
440	Rathia Cutlet	25.34	22.08.1964
440	Stately Boy	25.25	30.08.1966
520	Plenty of Action	30.06	1947
520	Shaggy Peter	29.79	08.06.1949
520	Bowness Snow	29.82	16.07.1966
725	Boothroyden Flash	42.35	22.08.1964
