= Derby Greyhound Stadium =

Former sports venue in Derby, England

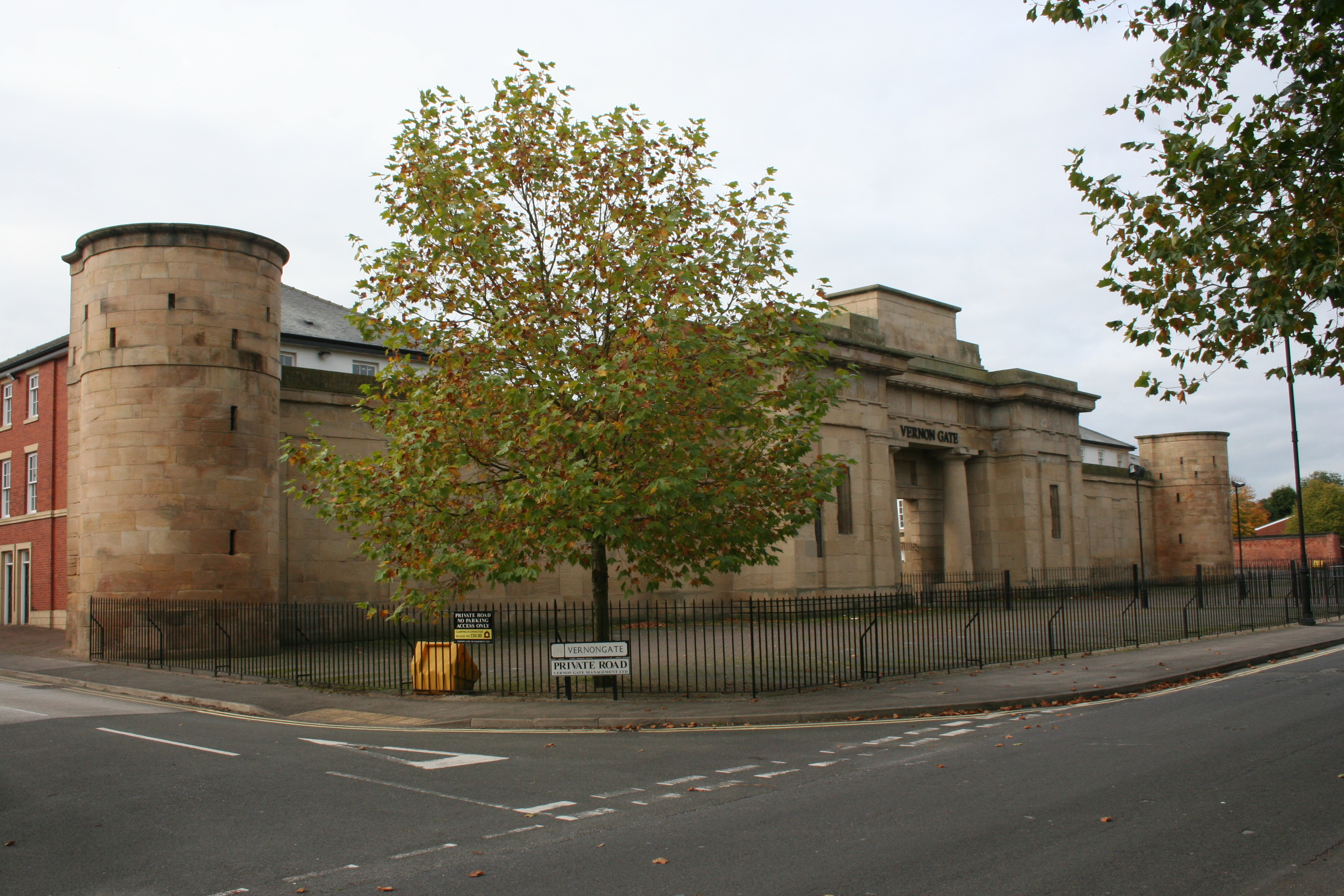
- Former stadium entrance, originally the prison gates; preserved facade, pictured 2008
- Interactive map of Derby Greyhound Stadium
- Location: Vernon Street, Derby
- Coordinates: 52°55′23″N 1°29′30″W
- Owner: Preston Greyhound Racing Association

Construction
- Opened: 1933
- Closed: 1988

Derby Greyhound Stadium or Derby Stadium was a greyhound racing venue in Derby, England.

== Origins ==
A full century before turning into a greyhound stadium the site was used as the county jail and called the Vernon Street Prison. It was a six-acre site on South Street backing onto Uttoxeter Old Road and cost £65,000 to build. The entrance was at the end of Vernon Street and the construction took six years to complete opening in 1827. The walls were 25 feet high enclosing three acres of land and the jail held over 300 prisoners.

It continued to serve as a prison until 1916 but was then used as a military prison. The buildings and cells inside the boundary walls were demolished in 1929 but the curtain wall and large entrance. Within five years the Preston Greyhound Racing Association had purchased the site and built a greyhound stadium within the walls.

== Opening ==
The company who had just opened their Preston track in May 1932 set an opening date of 29 April 1933. The first manager was Ted Rimmer (one of the famous Rimmer brothers within the industry) and facilities included two clubs, one in the grandstand and one in the popular enclosure. The first-ever winner was 2–1 shot Tramore Lad over 260 yards after defeating 6–4 favourite Santober by one length in 17.31. Many of the early races were just four dog events.

The circumference of the track was 385 yards which was laid out on the former exercise yard for the prisoners, other distances were 460 and 650 yards. The onsite kennels adjacent to the track backed onto Sims Avenue; the old prison officer's quarters were now houses for the trainers, a cookhouse, storage and staff rooms.

== History ==
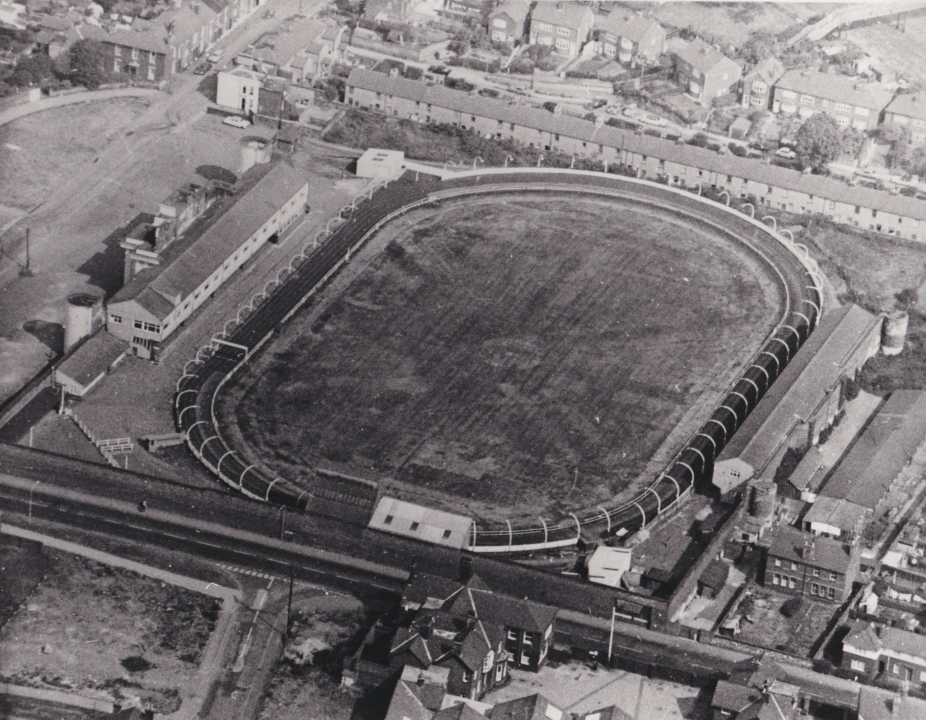
Derby Greyhound Stadium c.1950

Trainer Charlie Green provided the track with their first major winner when Silver Wire won the 1939 Scurry Gold Cup at Clapton Stadium. Another track trainer Harold Broadbent looked after the greyhounds housed in the adjoining stadium kennels owned by the company and he would eventually become the head of the RSPCA. After the war a greyhound called Keepers Remorse raced a remarkable 409 times, finishing second 98 times and in 1947 the tote turnover was £452,808.

Racing Managers included Lieutenant-Colonel Prior and George Turnpenny who arrived from Willenhall in the 1950s. In 1968 trainer John Horsfall switched to Catford Stadium after ten years at Derby. The next milestone came in 1968 after the Pat Murphy trained Malaria won the Midland Flat Championship. During the sixties race nights were on Wednesday and Saturday evenings and facilities included three buffet bars and two licensed bars. The circuit circumference was re-measured at 378 yards. In the 1970s Barry Davis was racing manager and two principal events were introduced, they were the Derby Plate over 420 metres and the Derby Vase over 590 metres

== Closure ==
In 1984 the ageing stadium was bought by Terry Corden for £300,000, Corden had taken over as general manager in 1979. Peter Robinson was brought in as racing manager and the only remaining trainers housed at the track kennels were Tom Harrison and Pat Murphy following the departure of Frank Heald and Peter Corbett. Corden sold the stadium for £1 million in 1988 to JF Miller properties and Heights of Abraham Limited. Within two years the Derby City Council received a planning application for redevelopment.

The last race meeting was held on Saturday 7 December 1988 (the same year as former sister track Preston). Today the area is very smart with office buildings contained within the redeveloped area. A beautifully restored entrance called Vernon Gate still marks the entrance of the prison and greyhound stadium.

== Track records ==
Distance	Greyhound	Time	Date
270 yards	Cheerful Cricket	15.21	1972
460 yards	Special Intention	26.00	1954
460 yards	Good Man	25.62	23 May 1964
460 yards	Mystic Prairie	=25.62	1970
460 yards	Rich Tea	25.51	1972
650 yards	Derry Fame	36.77	01 July 1964
460 yards	Spectre II	36.49	1970
246 metres	Illinois Riki	15.14	1979
246 metres	Spiral Gigi	14.94	1987
246 metres	Wiggy Park John	14.76	07.09.1987
420 metres	Westmead Border		1975
420 metres	Pacey	25.79	1979
420 metres	Bleakhall Wonder	25.74	06.04.1987
590 metres	Dyrnham Star	36.95	1975
590 metres	Band of Joy	36.89	1987
590 metres	Commons Darkie	36.56	11.11.1987
764 metres	Westmead Gale		1975
764 metres	Derange Me	49.40	1978
764 metres	Scurlogue Champ	49.04	16.11.1985
934 metres	Gloss	61.05	1979
934 metres	Sheffield Silver	61.95	15.04.1985
