= Norman Oliver (greyhound trainer) =

British greyhound racing professional trainer

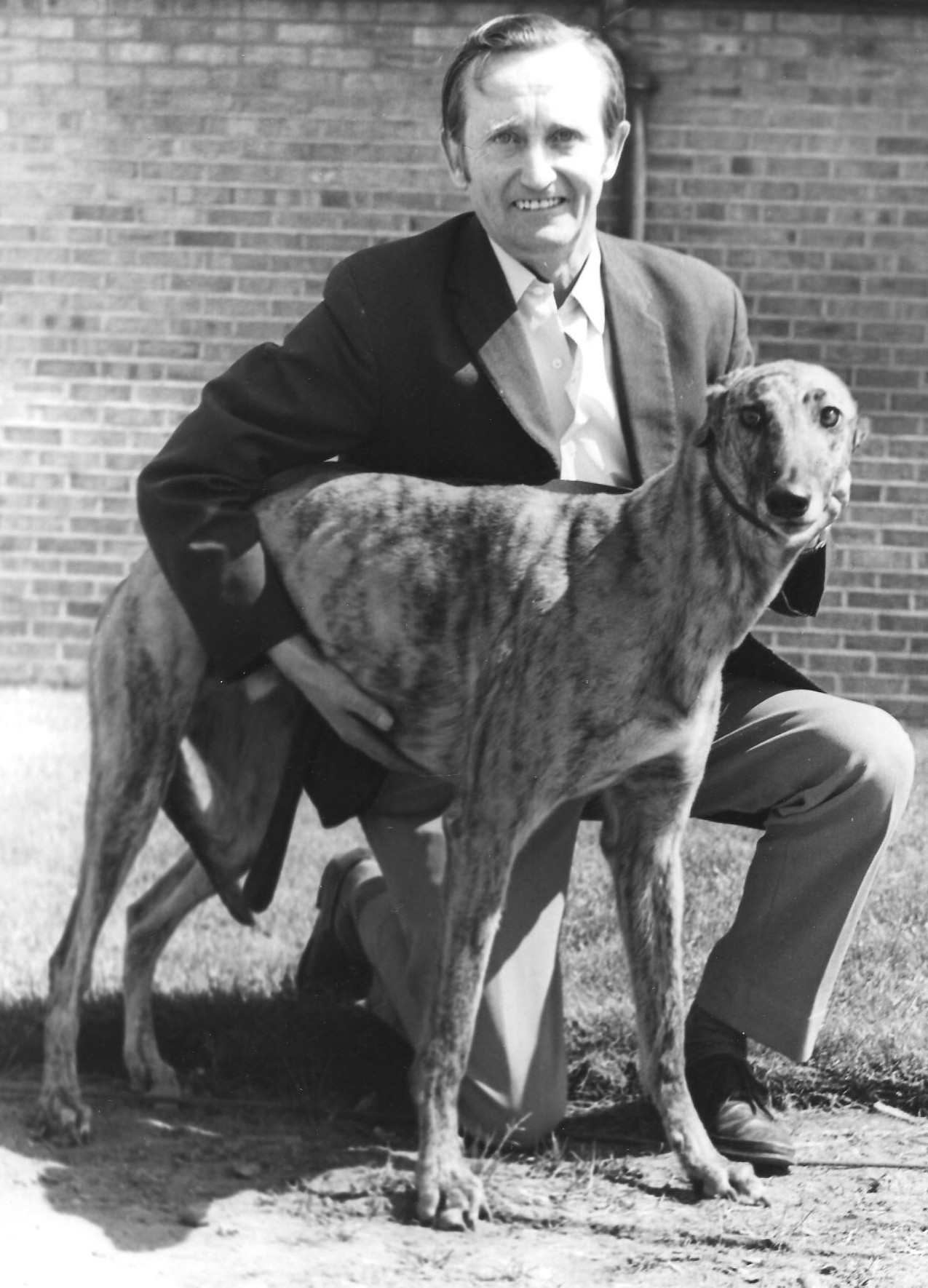
- Oliver with Ramdeen Stuart

Personal information
- Born: 11 November 1927 Newcastle upon Tyne, England
- Died: 21 June 2012 (aged 84) Newcastle upon Tyne, England
- Occupation: Greyhound Trainer

Sport
- Sport: Greyhound racing

Achievements and titles
- National finals: Derby wins: Scottish Derby (1967); Classic/Feature wins: St Leger (1972); Gold Collar (1973); BBC TV Trophy (1968); All England Cup (1973); Birmingham Cup (1971); Ebor Stakes (1963), (1968), (1973); Midland Flat (1962), (1963); Northern Flat (1963); Regency (1969); Steward's Cup (1972); St Mungo Cup (1968), (1973), (1976), (1977)

Norman Oliver (1927-2012), was an English greyhound trainer. He was 1973 UK Trainer of the Year.

== Biography ==
Oliver became involved in greyhound racing through his father Ted Oliver who was a bookmaker. Norman was attached to Brough Park in Newcastle during the entire training career.

Oliver's first success was winning the 1962 Midland Flat at Hall Green Stadium, with Happy Sailor. The following year he won several events and reached a major final when he steered Super Car through to the 1963 Scottish Greyhound Derby.

In 1967 he won his first major event when Hi Ho Silver won the Scottish Derby. An English Greyhound Derby finalist followed in 1968 when Shady Begonia reached the final. Shady Begonia also won the BBC Sportsview Television Trophy, the Regency and reached the Cesarewitch final but it was Ramdeen Stuart that was his star greyhound. Ramdeen Stuart won five major events, including the St Leger and Gold Collar.

He trained greyhounds for Kevin Keegan, Terry McDermott, Jonjo O'Neill and Tommy Stack.

He was voted 1973 UK Trainer of the Year. Oliver retired in 2010 and died in 2012 aged 84.

== Personal life ==
He married Dora and had two children Beverly and Denise. He owned racehorses, trained by Malcolm Jefferson.
