= East Anglian Derby (greyhounds) =

British greyhound racing competition

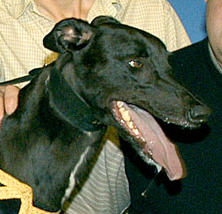
- 2004 champion Fire Height Dan
- Class: Category 1
- Location: Yarmouth Stadium
- Inaugurated: 1947 (unlicensed); 1975 (licensed)
- Sponsor: Click Competitions

Race information
- Distance: 462 metres
- Surface: Sand
- Purse: £15,000 (winner)

The East Anglian Derby is a greyhound competition held at Yarmouth Stadium.

== History ==
The event was inaugurated in 1947, when the stadium ran under independent rules. It continued to be a major race on the independent calendar before the stadium switched to National Greyhound Racing Club status. It was first run under NGRC rules in 1975 and is worth £15,000 to the winner today.

Charlie Lister OBE has won the event a record twelve times.

== Venues & distances ==
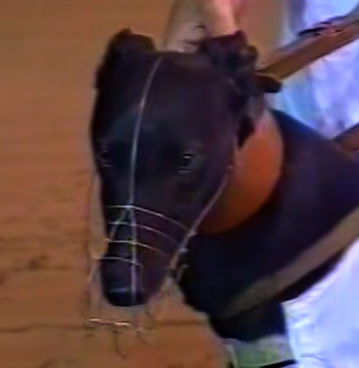
Money Matters, champion in 1987

- 1975–present - Yarmouth, 462 metres

== Sponsors ==
- 2008–2010 (Betfair)
- 2012–2012 (Ladbrokes}
- 2014–2015 (Totepool)
- 2017–2017 (Sunbets)
- 2018–2020 (Racing Post Greyhound TV)
- 2021–2022 (BresBet)
- 2023–present (Click Competitions)

== Past winners ==
Year	Winner	Breeding	Trainer	Time (sec)	SP	Notes/ref
1975	Another Gear	Cricket Bunny - Clipalong	Ron Wilding (Bletchley)	28.36	2/1	
1976	Huberts Town	Ivy Hall Flash - Cryptic Message	Ron Wilding (Bletchley)	28.57	6/1	
1977	Westmead Dance	Mels Pupil - Cricket Dance	John Wells (Yarmouth)	28.24	1/1f	
1978	Our Rufus	Rail Ship - Geraldine Gold	John Coleman (Wembley)	28.30	7/2	
1979	Our Rufus	Rail Ship - Geraldine Gold	John Coleman (Wembley)	28.44	2/1	
1980	Kilrickle Star	Nameless Star - Gurtroe Grand	Noreen Simmons (Private)	28.44	6/4f	
1981	Swift Band	Yellow Band - Swift Lass	Charlie Lister OBE (Private)	28.33	7/4	
1982	Swift Rapier	Lindas Champion - Ballinderry Moth	Barney O'Connor (Walthamstow)	28.24	6/4	
1983	Creamery Cross	Knockrour Slave - Creamery Alice	Allen Briggs (Private)	28.29	5/4jf	
1984	Blueberry Gold	Instant Gambler - High Old Time	Irvin Parker (Peterborough)	28.88	9/1	
1985	Ballygroman Jim	Knockrour Tiger - Lee View Lady	Ernie Gaskin Sr. (Peterborough)	28.51	5/1	
1986	Short Answer	You Genius - Jo Jos Girl	Kenny Linzell (Walthamstow)	28.34	2/1	
1987	Money Matters	Glenroe Hiker - Money Rings	Geoff De Mulder (Private)	28.27	4/11f	
1988	Curryhills Gara	Lindas Champion - Moygara Soda	Ernie Gaskin Sr. (Private)	28.35	8/13f	
1989	Castleivy Mick	Moral Support - Rambling Florist	Freda Greenacre (Private)	28.27	7/2	
1990	Artie Joe	I'm Slippy - Warm Jenny	Charlie Lister (Private)	28.57	3/1	
1991	Dempsey Duke	Shanagarry Duke - Willowbrook Peg	Terry Kibble (Bristol)	27.68	7/4	
1992	Murlens Abbey	Daleys Gold - Murlens Toe	John Copplestone (Portsmouth)	28.19	4/6f	
1993	Just Right Kyle	Kyle Jack - Im A Duchess	Charlie Lister (Private)	28.30	10/11f	
1994	Franks Doll	Kilbarry Slippy - Come On Mandy	Justin Scott (Private)	29.38	5/1	
1995	Dragon Prince	Whisper Wishes - Supreme Miss	Charlie Lister (Nottingham)	28.56	11/4	
1996	Blue Murlen	Murlens Abbey - Lovely Lovely	Gary Harding (Yarmouth)	28.10	11/10f	
1997	Terrydrum Kate	Amidus Slippy - Rathbeg Crystal	Charlie Lister (Nottingham)	28.28	11/4	
1998	Ceekay	Cry Dalcash - Supa Plan	Linda Mullins (Walthamstow)	28.27	7/2	
1999	Caseys Shadow	Droopys Sandy - Queen Panther	Russell Samson (Reading)	27.93	11/2	
2000	Courts Legal	Always Good - Carrowkeal Mandy	Linda Jones (Walthamstow)	28.27	15/8f	
2001	Hanover Peer	Mountleader Peer - Frightful Flyer	Raymond Pleasants (Yarmouth)	28.48	16/1	
2002	Larkhill Bullet	Staplers Jo - Annies Bullet	Charlie Lister (Private)	28.22	6/4f	
2003	Burberry Boy	Top Honcho - Faultless Quest	Charlie Lister (Private)	28.01	1/1f	
2004	Fire Height Dan	Carlton Bay - September Mist	Mick Puzey (Walthamstow)	28.06	9/4	
2005	Fear No One	Toms the Best - Step and Go	Mark Wallis (Walthamstow)	28.73	3/1	
2006	Geordie Parker	Brett Lee - Lydpal Louise	Charlie Lister (Private)	27.94	1/1f	
2007	Blackrose Mars	Larkhill Jo - Christmas Holly	Eric Cantillon (Private)	27.71	11/2	
2008	Ninja Jamie	Droopys Maldini - Farloe Oyster	Charlie Lister (Private)	27.40	11/10f	
2009	Fear Zafonic	Premier Fantasy – Farloe Oyster	Charlie Lister (Private)	27.57	9/2	
2010	Fear Zafonic	Premier Fantasy – Farloe Oyster	Charlie Lister (Private)	27.46	1/3f	
2011	Ballymac Ace	Ace Hi Rumble – Ballymac Mir	Chris Allsopp (Monmore)	27.89	7/2	
2012	Bubbly Phoenix	College Causeway – Droopys Top Gal	Paul Young (Romford)	27.36	4/5f	
2013	Any Dak	Hondo Black – River Dancer	Hazel Kemp (Henlow)	27.34	4/6f	
2014	Swift Keith	Vans Escalade – Swift Sandy	John Mullins (Yarmouth)	27.81	9/4f	
2015	Do It For Twiggy	Droopys Scolari – Rackethall Holly	Erica Samuels (Yarmouth)	27.82	13/8f	
2016	Clondoty Alex	Razldazl Jayfkay – Castlehill Alex	Mark Wallis (Towcester)	27.79	9/2	
2017	Newinn Shadow	Kinloch Brae – Newinn Expert	Charlie Lister OBE (Private)	27.23	8/1	
2018	Affane Party	Sparta Maestro – Affane Katie	John Lambe (Perry Barr)	27.32	9/4	
2019	Roxholme Nidge	Droopys Nidge – Silver Dollar	Hayley Keightley (Doncaster)	27.89	4/11f	
2020	Kilara Lion	Droopys Jet – Kilara Lizzie	Patrick Janssens (Central Park)	27.62	6/1	
2021	Antigua Storm	Droopys Jet – Basket Of Trumps	Mark Wallis (Henlow)	27.78	7/4f	
2022	Hopes Paddington	Good News – Charity Anna	Mark Wallis (Henlow)	27.66	7/1	
2023	Watch The Limo	Droopys Sydney – Limini	Seamus Cahill (Hove)	27.78	7/1	
2024	Druids Say Go	Droopys Sydney – Druids Diana	Patrick Janssens (Towcester)	27.26	4/6f	
2025	Romeo Steel	Ballymac Cashout – Fabulous Amalfi	Patrick Janssens (Towcester)	27.17	3/10f	
