= Arc (greyhounds) =

Greyhound racing competition

The Arc
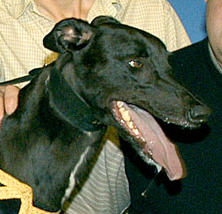
- 2005 champion Fire Height Dan
- Class: Category 1
- Location: Walthamstow Stadium; Swindon Stadium
- Inaugurated: 1987
- Final run: 2017

Race information
- Distance: 475/480 metres
- Surface: Sand

The Arc was a greyhound racing competition held at Abbey Stadium, Swindon. It was inaugurated in 1987 at Walthamstow Stadium but when the track closed in 2008 the event switched to Swindon.

In 2018, Swindon announced that the event would be staged at a different time due to building work but this never materialised and the competition came to an end.

== Venues and distances ==
- 1987–2008 (Walthamstow, 475m)
- 2007–2017 (Swindon, 480m)

== Sponsors ==
- 1987–1994 (Racing Post)
- 1998–1998 (UK Packaging)
- 2009–2009 (Blue Square)
- 2010–2010 (Betfair)
- 2012–2012 (Ladbrokes)
- 2013–2014 (Pin Point Recruitment)
- 2015–2017 (Calne Racing)

== Past winners ==
Year	Winner	Breeding	Trainer	Time (sec)	SP	Notes/ref
1987	Funny Oyster	Debbycot Lad - Cu Helen	John Sherry (Walthamstow)	28.98	9/2	
1988	Foretop	Blue Train - Green Slieve	Kenny Linzell (Walthamstow)	28.98	7/4f	
1989	Kilcannon Bullet	Odell Supreme - Murlens Toe	John Coleman (Walthamstow)	28.58	33/1	
1990	Brownies Outlook	Citizen Supreme - Hardi Hostess	Peter Payne (Romford)	28.94	5/1	
1991	Fires Of War	Dipmac - Marys Silver	Tony Meek (Oxford)	28.82	2/1	
1992	Murlens Abbey	Daleys Gold - Murlens Toe	John Copplestone (Portsmouth)	28.61	3/1	
1993	Bonney Seven	Airmount Grand - Powerstown Pine	John Coleman (Walthamstow)	28.82	10/11f	
1994	Westmead Chick	I'm Slippy - Westmead Move	Nick Savva (Hackney)	28.73	8/1	
1995	Westmead Merlin	Murlens Slippy - Westmead Hannah	Nick Savva (Walthamstow)	28.79	1/1f	
1996	Coom Cruiser	Arrow House - Coom Cross	Derek Knight (Hove)	28.92	5/1	
1997	Blue Murlen	Murlens Abbey - Lovely Lovely	Mick Smith (Private)	28.56	13/8f	
1998	Ceekay	Cry Dalcash - Supa Plan	Linda Mullins (Walthamstow)	28.80	10/1	
1999	El Hombre	Frightful Flash - Fly Smasher	Linda Mullins (Walthamstow)	28.86	7/2	
2000	Fat Boy Slim	Some Picture - Elbony Violet	Jim Reynolds (Walthamstow)	28.62	7/4f	
2001	Scotts Kelly	Droopys Fintan - Stows Val	John Mullins (Walthamstow)	29.29	9/4	
2002	Vancouver Jet	Spiral Nikita - Lemon Jackson	Linda Jones (Walthamstow)	28.94	3/1	
2003	Hopeful Moment	Staplers Jo - Ballyhaden Girl	Ernie Gaskin Sr. (Walthamstow)	28.72	7/2	
2004	Airtech Rapid	Jamella Prince - Shining Mist	Paul Young (Romford)	29.21	7/1	
2005	Fire Height Dan	Carlton Bale - September Mist	Mick Puzey (Walthamstow)	28.62	5/2	
2006	Milldean Billy	Frisby Flashing - Autumn Leigh	Seamus Cahill (Wimbledon)	29.19	4/1	
2007	Too Risky	Daves Mentor - Micks Bozz	Mick Puzey (Walthamstow)	28.70	7/2	
2008	Centaur Decree	Kiowa Sweet Trey - Movealong Rose	Mark Wallis (Walthamstow)	28.45	7/2	
2009	Corrig Vieri	Droopys Vieri – Corrig Rebel	Mark Wallis (Harlow)	28.92	7/2	
2010	Farloe Titan	Elite State – Farloe Charity	Paul Sallis (Hall Green)	28.38	7/1	
2011	Jolly Poacher	Droopys Cahill – Miss Regina	Nick Colton (Oxford)/(Swindon)	28.50	5/1	
2012	Ballymac Cryan	Rumble Impact – Coolavanny Minor	Matt Dartnall (Swindon)	28.47	11/2	
2013	Shaneboy Alley	Ballymac Maeve – Shaneboy Dorie	Liz McNair (Private)	28.18	1/1f	Track Record
2014	King Dec	Eden Brett – Pretty Fantasy	Liz McNair (Private)	28.57	8/1	
2015	Kippers Usain	Moveit Jaime – Kippers Doll	Chris Allsopp (Towcester)	28.60	8/1	
2016	Ballymac Brogan	Ballymac Vic – Bawna Elsa	Seamus Cahill (Hove)	28.49	9/4jf	
2017	Garryvoe Bobby	Knockglass Billy - Vickis Dream	Graham Holland (Ireland)	28.35	11/10f	
