= Rye House Stadium =

Greyhound racing and speedway venue in Hoddeson, Hertfordshire

Coordinates: 51°46′9″N 0°0′33″E

- Interactive map of Rye House Stadium
- Location: Rye Road; Hoddesdon; Hertfordshire; EN11 0EH, England
- Owner: Rye House Group

Construction
- Opened: 27 May 1934
- Closed: 2018
- Demolished: 2020

Rye House Stadium was a speedway and greyhound racing venue in Rye Road, Hoddesdon, Hertfordshire, England. It is situated adjacent to the River Lea Navigation.

== Origins ==
The name Rye House originates from a collection of medieval buildings on an area known as the Isle of Rye due to the fact that the land was directly next door to the River Lea/Lee and in particular the Lee Navigation. When the stadium was constructed in 1934 it was put next door to Rye House on a spare plot which is where the name for the stadium came from. Rye House had been the family home for the Parr family that included Catherine in the 16th century and later a workhouse and tourist attraction in the 19th century. All that remains today of the original Rye House is the gatehouse found to the north of the stadium.

== Pre WW2 history ==
In 1934 (the site owned by Taylor-Walkers) saw the construction of a speedway track and it hosted open meetings on a circuit that had been converted from a former running track. Under the charge of the Harringay Light Car and Motor Cycle Club, the track soon became known as a training school for riders. The stadium was accessed from Rye Road either in an easterly or westerly direction with Hoddesdon to the west and a large sewage works to the east.

In 1937, the speedway rider Dicky Case took over the sixty acre estate of Rye House and introduced a training school operating under the name of the Hackney Motor Club. The site included a greyhound racing track at this time. The school operated until 1938, when Rye House entered the Sunday Dirt-track League. The stadium was described as being able to hold 4,000 spectators. Rye House stadium continued to operate speedway from 1940 to 1943, despite the disruption caused by World War II.

== Post war history ==
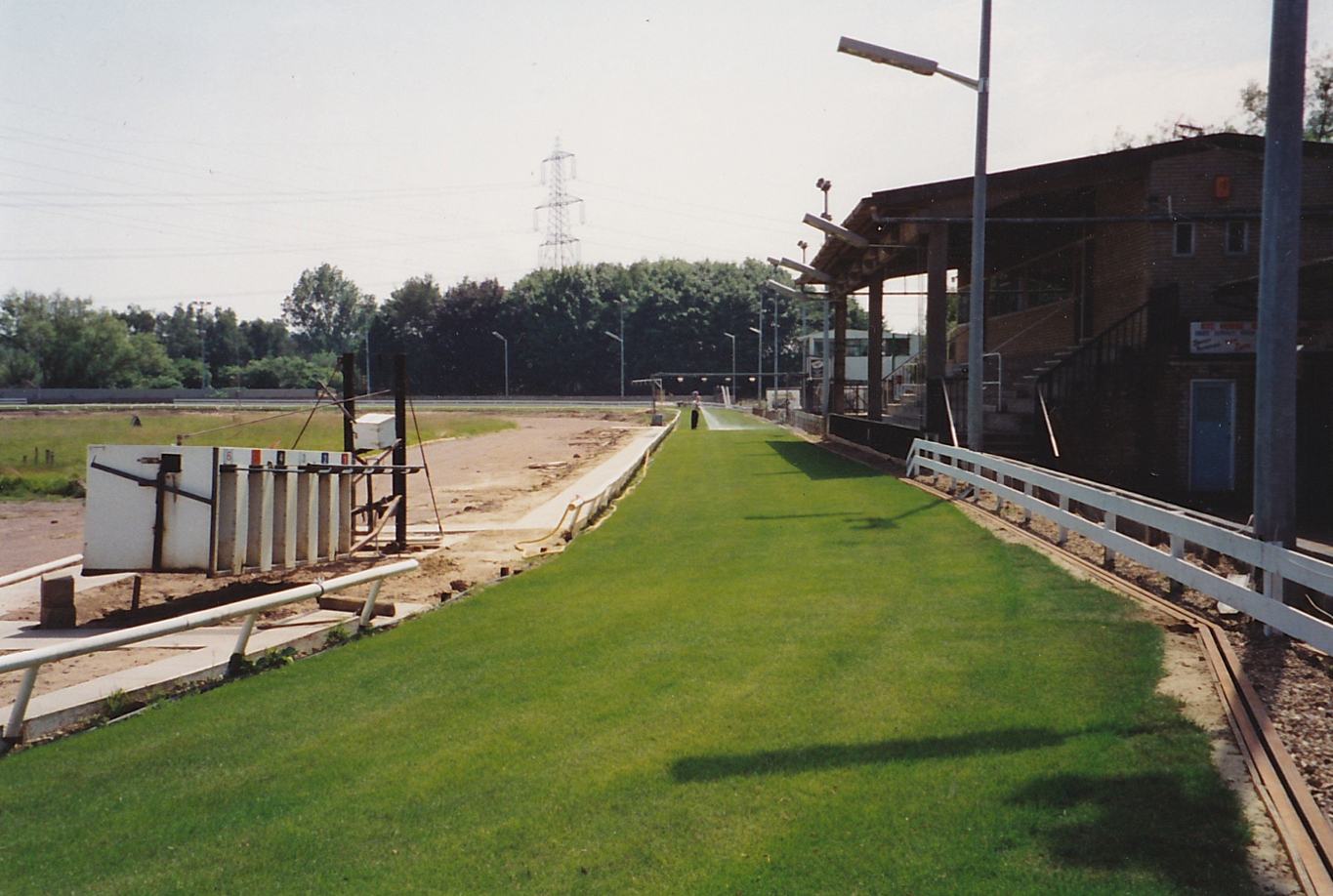
Grass greyhound track and speedway track on the inside. (Rye House Stadium c.1980)

After the end of the war the track was re-opened by Arthur Elvin (the Wembley Stadium Managing Director) and was once again used as a training school, this time for the Wembley Lions riders. The site remained under the ownership of Dicky Case and was the foremost venue for aspiring speedway riders throughout the decade.

In 1960, Gerry Bailey and Jack Carter took over the lease from owner L. H. Lawrence and immediately began to upgrade the facilities moving the greyhound track to the outside of the speedway track to form a 440-yard circumference. Racing was held on Wednesday and Saturday evenings and an 'Inside Sumner' system and photo finish was installed. The stadium hosted a qualifying round of the 1972 Individual Speedway World Championship.

During 1974, six independent tracks (unaffiliated to a governing body) took advantage of the new National Greyhound Racing Club (NGRC) rule allowing smaller venues to join them in what was called the permit scheme. Hackney Wick Stadium introduced the Lead sponsored by William Hill in 1975 and switched the 1,000 Guineas to a longer distance, consequently Rye House introduced the Sovereign Stakes for sprinters to compensate for the loss of the 1,000 Guineas. The competition attracted some of the sports leading sprinters.

Gin And Jass trained by Dave Drinkwater claimed the Crayford Vase and broke four track records in addition to winning the Pall Mall Stakes in 1976. Salina and Regal Girl (both George Lang) won two consecutive 'Key' competition victories before Dutch Jet became Peterborough Derby champion in 1983 for Jean Talmage.

The management found it difficult to continue racing under NGRC rules due to increased costs and in 1985 reverted to independent racing. However, in March 1988, Eddie Lesley took over the lease and brought the stadium back under NGRC rules once again. The track dimensions were changed to a 389 circumference and distances of 255, 465, 595 and 655m. Gerry Bailey was installed as the Racing Manager who then took over the lease again with Carter in 1990 and they in turn made Ray Spalding the Racing Manager. Spalding was later to become General Manager with Frank Baldwin brought in as Racing Manager.

In 1995, Theo Mentzis won the St Leger with Kens Dilemma and one year later Night Trooper finished runner up in the English Greyhound Derby. Night Trooper a black dog trained by Nikki Adams then went undefeated through the Pall Mall in 1997 and claimed the Reading Masters.

John 'Ginger' McGee had an attachment at the track in 1998 following his return from a 1994 NGRC ban and in 1999 the Sovereign Stakes was revived under new Racing Manager David Quinn. which was won by Night Trooper.

In the summer of 2000 the site was sold to Silversport owned by speedway promoter Len Silver and Hazel Naylor but after a short venture with the greyhound racing they ended the greyhounds in 2004. The greyhounds remained closed until 2005 before re-opening under former Racing Manager Sue Picton and then closing for good on 15 November 2006.

The stadium was taken over by Warren Scott in 2016 and underwent an upgrade. However, Scott was subject to a bankruptcy order in 2018. In 2019, the stadium was taken over by the Rye House Group, who subsequently submitted plans (in 2020) to the East Hertfordshire District Council for redevelopment of the site. The stadium was demolished in December 2020. The Rye House Group carried out work in 2021 which was refused retrospective planning permission in September 2023.

== Competitions ==
=== Sovereign Stakes ===
Extended content

Year	Winner	Breeding	Trainer	Time (sec)	SP
1976	Raheen Sam	Geriomar – Poor Cathy	John Coleman (Wembley)	17.13	4/1
1977	Paddock Boy	Nelson Pillar - Diapson	Mr Dale-Mills (Private)	17.05	14/1
1978	Knockrour Brandy	Bright Lad – Knockrour Last	Freda Greenacre (Private)	17.17	3/1
1979	Flying Pursuit	Kudas Honour – Faoide Look	John Gibbons (Rochester)	16.97	5/4f
1980	Greenfield Chief	Rapid Chief – Beyond Clogheen	Jerry Fisher (Reading)	17.00	6/1
1981	Skipping Scot	Liberty Lad – Lady Armada	Bryce Wilson (Shawfield)	17.03	10/11f
1982	Valiant Point	Valiant Band - Ashgrove Point	Mark Sullivan (Private)	17.17	7/4
1983	Upton Rocket	Nameless Star – Knockrour Girl	Kenny Linzell (Walthamstow)	16.99	4/6f
1984	Upton Rocket	Nameless Star – Knockrour Girl	Kenny Linzell (Walthamstow)	16.70	4/5f
1985	Daleys Gold	Lindas Champion – Ballinderry Moth	Jerry Fisher (Reading)	16.64	4/7f
1987	Lissadell Tiger	Bold Work – Cleonas Style	Ernie Gaskin Sr. (Private)	16.72	9/1
1988	Office Whisper	Whisper Wishes – Plucky Linda	John Faint (Rye House)	16.32	3/1
1989	Lissadell Tiger	Bold Work – Cleonas Style	Ernie Gaskin Sr. (Private)	15.90	8/1
1990	Maireads Sand	Manorville Sand – Maireads Ruby	George Lang (Crayford)	16.09	6/1
1991	Carrrigeen Zig	Whisper Wishes – Carrigeen Lucky	Ron Hough (Sheffield)	16.27	5/2
1992	Wheres The Limo	Glen Park Dancer – Kingswell Joy	Linda Mullins (Walthamstow)	15.82	4/5f
1993	Saucy Child	Childrens Champ – Cuofruse Girl	Olabode Ayegune (Private)	15.79	7/1
1999	Night Trooper	Portrun Flier - Suir Orla	Nikki Adams (Rye House)	16.37	3/1

1986, 1994-1998, 2001-2003 (not held)

== Track records ==
Extended content

Metres	Greyhound	Time	Date
210	Our Dog Raphael	13.59	29 March 1998
255	Mairead Sand	15.71	1989
255	Strange Dilly	15.66	30 May 1990
265	Mossley Mead	15.87	10 October 1999
270	Fast Kodiak	16.46	29 February 2004
270	Melodys Jo	16.29	26 June 2005
270	Torbal Dante	16.26	3 July 2005
270	Run for Bally	16.20	2 October 2005
270	Ringtown Mojo	16.20	5 November 2006
281	Tiger Jazz	16.91	1978
281	Daleys Gold	16.59	1987
383	Fast Kodiak	23.17	9 May 2004
435	Thats the Bullet	26.50	2 October 2005
435	Davdor Dashing	26.28	13 August 2006
445	Prinz Eugen	26.34	6 September 1998
465	Columbcille Gem	27.85	1989
465	Ring Slippy	27.76	25 October 1989
480	Deejay Scores	29.52	14 September 2003
480	Farview Peek	29.33	21 September 2003
480	Tain Sli	29.26	10 April 2005
480	Tolon Prince	29.16	3 July 2005
484	Outlatwick Kibo	29.88	1976
484	Glamour Hobo	29.25	1987
484	Night Trooper	28.52	1997
600	Run on Terry	37.50	30 July 1988
628	Billysroundabout	38.60	31 July 2005
628	Graigue Robin	38.52	23 October 2005
630	Kens Dilemma	38.75	1996
655	Special Gamble	40.37	20 July 1988
670	Askinvillar King	43.12	1976
670	Go Go Tiger	42.73	3 April 1985
680	Shelbourne Star	42.43	19 October 2003
680	Sooty Sive	42.38	23 January 2005
680	Greenacre Lin	42.33	6 August 2006
680	Greenacre Lin	41.91	13 August 2006
685	Dunmurry Flight	41.75	1 November 1998
845	Yamaha Autumn	54.42	23 January 2005
865	Decoy Madonna	54.69	10 July 1989
865	Bubbly Princess	53.25	4 April 1999
870	Cloonty Lib	57.05	1987
905	Souda Bay	56.58	29 March 1998
485 H	Creevy Rover	29.56	20 August 2000
