= Abbey Stadium (Swindon) =

Closed greyhound and speedway track

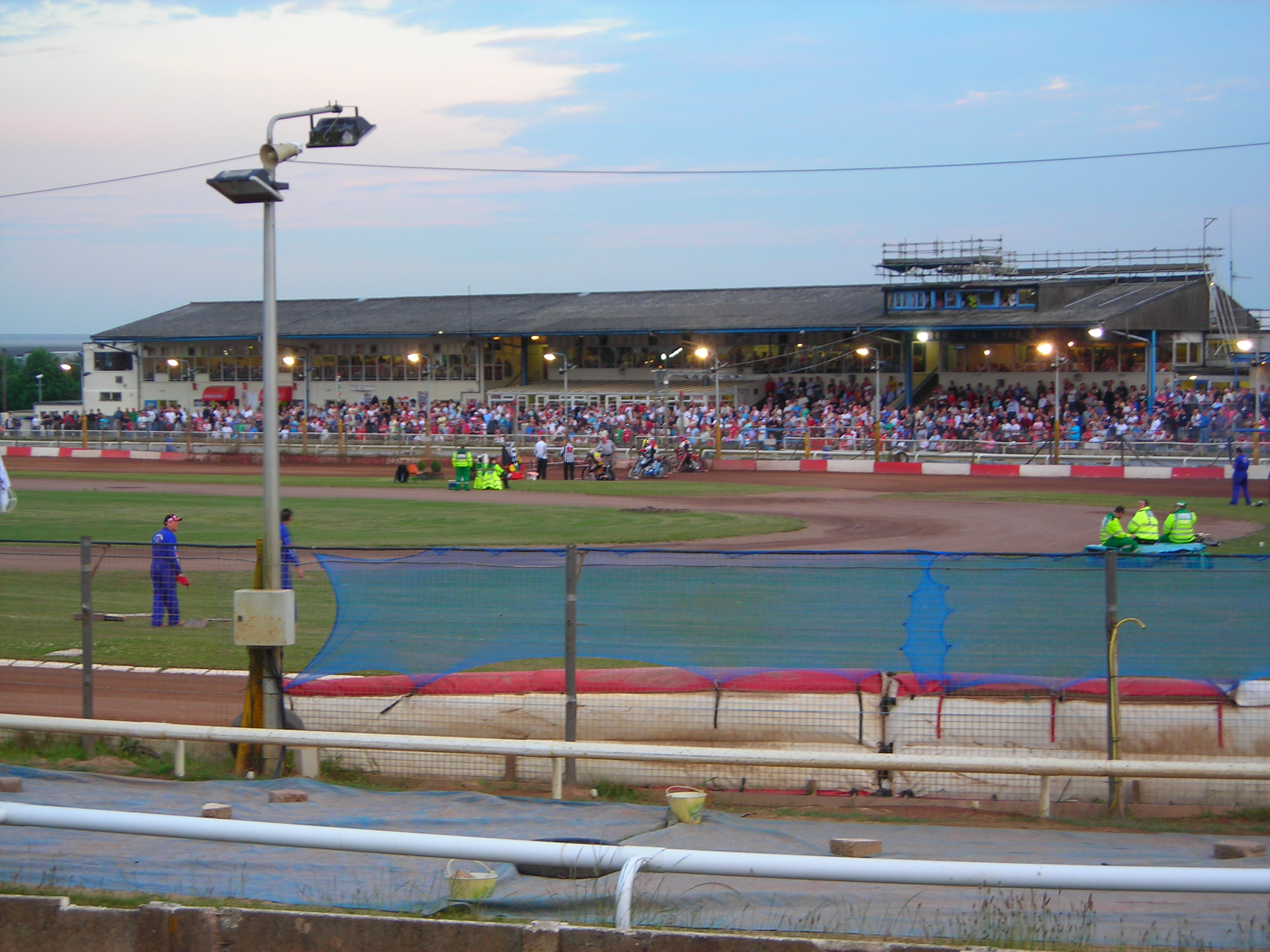
- Abbey Stadium hosting a Speedway event in 2009
- Interactive map of Abbey Stadium
- Full name: Abbey Stadium
- Location: Lady Lane, Swindon, England
- Coordinates: 51.607°N 1.792°W
- Capacity: 2,000

Construction
- Groundbreaking: 1947
- Opened: 23 July 1949
- Closed: 27 December 2025

Tenants
- Greyhound racing; Swindon Robins

Website
- Official website

Abbey Stadium (also known as Swindon Stadium) is a closed greyhound racing and speedway track in Swindon, England, located within the St Andrews civil parish.

From its inception in 1949, the stadium was home to the Swindon Robins, a speedway team who later competed in the SGB Premiership. Three years later in 1952, greyhound racing was introduced and raced under regulation from the National Greyhound Racing Club (NGRC) from 1968.

Since July 2006, the stadium's footprint has been the subject of numerous redevelopment proposals. In November 2016, housing developments began on disused land towards the rear of the stadium. On 17 October 2019, the Swindon Robbins raced for the final time and did not return due to the COVID-19 pandemic and uncertainty regarding their stadium's future. In June 2022, permission was granted to build houses on the majority of the stadium's car park.

In March 2025, its owners announced the stadium would close at the end of the year. The stadium hosted its final public greyhound racing event on 23 December 2025, and its final greyhound racing event was held on 27 December 2025, behind closed doors.

Following the refusal of a planning application in March 2026 to demolish the stadium and replace it with a housing development, councillors and local residents have campaigned for the continued use of the grounds for leisure services, while some have specifically advocated for the return of Swindon Robins. In September 2026, Gaming International entered receivership, making the future ownership of the land uncertain.

== History ==
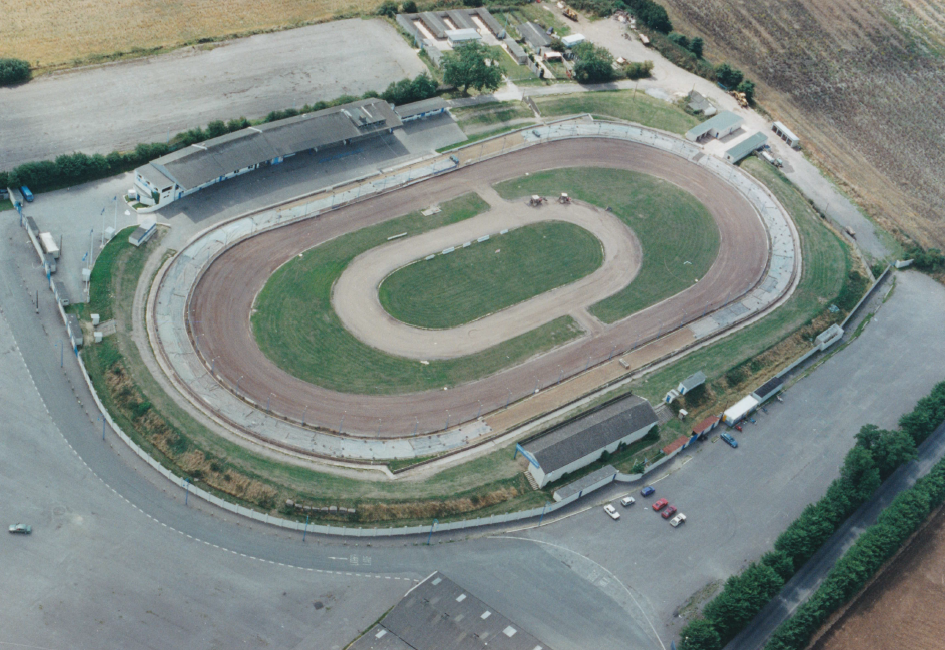
Abbey Stadium c.1980

Abbey Stadium opened to the public on 23 July 1949 when it hosted the Swindon Robins speedway team; greyhound racing followed three years later on 1 November 1952. Initially, the greyhound racing was independent (unlicensed), with 2,000 people attending to watch a greyhound called Don't Care win a 324-yard race in a time of 19.02 secs at odds of 6–1. Later in 1968, racing was regulated by the NGRC, which later became the Greyhound Board of Great Britain.

Swindon had two earlier short-lived greyhound track venues, in the village of Wroughton and near the town centre in Edinburgh Street, but both had disappeared by the mid-thirties. Abbey Stadium occupied a rural setting south of Lady Lane and was named after the Blunsdon Abbey estate in Blunsdon St Andrew, a Victorian estate which had seen its main house destroyed by fire in 1904.

Abbey Stadium was later acquired by the Bristol Greyhound Racing Association, owners of Oxford and Eastville (Bristol) stadiums. This led to the track becoming part of the National Greyhound Racing Club during April 1968. The Silver Plume competition arrived in the same year, as the track's principal event. Another independent track to the northwest of Swindon opened during the sixties at Common Platt, but had little effect on the business of its larger neighbour.

In 1983, ADT (British Car Auctions) acquired Abbey Stadium and used its large car park as a base for their sales. Other competitions at the track were the Grand National of the West, Pride of the West and the Jubilee Stakes. In 1997, Gaming International (then The BS Group) sold their Eastville Stadium and bought Abbey Stadium from ADT. The entire Bristol operation including the racing office, bookmakers, trainers, the Western Two Year Old Produce Stakes and the BAGS contract transferred to Abbey Stadium.

In 2008, due to the closure of Walthamstow stadium, Abbey Stadium hosted the Arc competition. In 2018, Abbey Stadium signed a deal with Arena Racing Company to hold weekly matinée meetings on Monday, Wednesday and Friday. In 2018, the Arc competition was discontinued due to expected track changes, but following the sudden closure of Towcester Greyhound Stadium, leading owner John Turner stepped in to save the Oaks with a late scheduling in December.

Abbey Stadium signed a new media rights five-year contract extension with Arena Racing Company to run from January 2025.

=== Redevelopment plans (2006–2020s) ===
In July 2006, landowners Gaming International announced that they wished to demolish the stadium, and transform the site into a business park, but would work to find a new home for the Swindon Robins. The announcement triggered a petition with over 2,000 signatories to save the speedway events. Clarke Osborne, chief executive of Gaming International, argued that there was not enough support to keep speedway events commercially viable, and pointed to noise complaints from local residents.

In May 2007, following a 'Save Our Robins' campaign, Gaming International proposed a new purpose-built stadium for speedway and greyhound racing, as well as a new business park, covered market, and 450 homes, using disused land towards the back of the stadium. In February 2008, councillors approved plans for the new stadium. In May 2008, planning inspectors approved plans for the new stadium. In September 2008, the plans for the new stadium were approved, but halted due to the Great Recession. In November 2010, the plans were given the green light again. In August 2011, outline planning permission was granted again. In March 2013, plans were shown to the public at an exhibition. In December 2013, permission was granted to build 66 houses on disused ground at the stadium, in the hope this would kickstart plans for the new stadium. In March 2015, plans for a new stadium were renewed.

In November 2016, housing development on disused land began but the stadium redevelopment plans were delayed. In June 2019, the original plans to reposition the stadium and track were scrapped, and the track was reduced in circumference from 463 metres by creating two new bends inside the old circumference, making way for housing; as a consequence the 509-metre distance was scrapped. The planning authority disallowed any further housing additions until progress was made with renovating the stadium. The stadium and track remained in its original position with plans to install prefabricated buildings in place of the existing buildings, instead of a new-built stadium as originally promised. The stadium hosted its final speedway racing event at the end of the season on 17 October 2019, and the Swindon Robins did not compete in subsequent seasons due to uncertainty surrounding the stadium's redevelopment plans. The development plans were largely halted throughout 2020 and 2021 due to the COVID-19 pandemic, however a new pre-fabricated seating stand was constructed during this time.

In June 2022, builders Taylor Wimpey were granted permission to build 127 homes on most of the stadium's car park. In December 2022, a stand-off occurred between Gaming International, Swindon Borough Council and Taylor Wimpey over perimeters and expected redevelopment. Clarke Osborne of Gaming International issued a press release, stating that the company wanted to instead relocate the stadium, seeking a new site for a 5,000-capacity stadium to host speedway, karting and car racing. The industry remained sceptical as similar statements had been issued in prior years by Gaming International for their venues in Milton Keynes, Poole, Reading and Eastville. In March 2024, an application to remove the requirements for the site to host speedway and greyhound racing events was presented. In September 2024, a 'Swindon Needs Speedway' group was launched and organised a petition to attempt to retain speedway events at the stadium. At the same time, Gaming International speculated that a new stadium could be built near Royal Wootton Bassett.

=== Closure (2025) ===
In March 2025, Gaming International announced that the stadium would host its final greyhound racing event at the end of the year and that the stadium would be demolished, with Clarke Osborne highlighting mounting costs and declining attendances. In April 2025, Gaming International and Legal & General proposed a new housing development to sit on the footprint of the Abbey Stadium. In September 2025, Gaming International's new division, Swindon Motorsports Ltd, urged residents to have their say on a consultation into a proposed new speedway stadium on the outskirts of Swindon.

Abbey Stadium hosted its final greyhound racing event on 27 December 2025, behind closed doors.

=== Post-closure ===
On 7 March 2026, it was revealed that former speedway rider Alun Rossiter had written to Swindon Borough Council about saving the Abbey Stadium from demolition and had been liaising with a group of prospective investors with a view to continuing the stadium's operation.

On 12 March 2026, Legal & General and Gaming International's planning application to demolish the stadium and replace it with a housing development, park, and a community sports and retail hub was refused by Swindon Borough Council. This was due to concerns that the loss of the Abbey Stadium would diminish the neighbourhood, alongside a lack of parking provision for the proposed sports and retail hub.

On 18 August 2026, Gaming International's chairman, Clarke Osborne, passed away. On 18 September 2026, Gaming International entered receivership, making the future ownership of the Abbey Stadium land uncertain.

== Competitions ==
=== Silver Plume ===
Extended content

Year	Winner	Breeding	Trainer	Time	SP	Notes
1968	Glory Newtown	Printers Prince – Kilmagoura Daisy	Colin McNally (Perry Barr)	29.18		
1969	The Bad Drop	Prairie Flash – Lady Juliana	Mrs Kay Lee (Swindon)	30.35	20–1	
1970	Ballybeg Flash	Prairie Flash – Knock Late	Joe Booth (Private)	30.71		Track record
1971	Spectre's Dream	Spectre – Jockeys Dream	Hugo Spencer (Portsmouth)		1-1f	
1978	Lisnastrane Luke	Sole Aim – Trina Ann	Hazel Walden (Swindon)	28.78		
1990	Kilcurley Coal	Moneypoint Coal – Victoria Range	John McGee (Hackney)	29.04	2-1jf	
1992	Summerhill Super	Daleys Gold – Tiny Tolcas	John Copplestone (Reading)	28.19	2-5f	
1993	Forever Roving	Skelligs Tiger – Roving Linda	Bill Masters (Hove)	28.77	8–1	
1994	Crafty Fontana	Druids Lodge – Crafty Winter	Linda Mullins (Walthamstow)	28.69	4–1	
1998	Trade Style	Trade Official – Biddys Style	Cindy Clapp (Hall Green)	28.84	5–1	Track record

1968–1974: 550 yards, 1975–1998: 480 metres

== Track records ==
=== At closing ===
Metres	Greyhound	Time	Date	Notes
262	Impact George	15.10	11 December 2022	
476	Queen Joni	27.53	14 September 2023	Produce Stakes semi final
682	Ballymac Mags	41.18	2 March 2023	
896	A Mystical Love	56.43	21 September 2023	

=== Former ===
Extended content

Former track records (post-metric)

Metres	Greyhound	Time	Date	Notes
275	Fearless Swift	16.28	19 August 1985	
280	Mollifrend Tom	16.19	5 October 1988	
285	Leaders Highway	16.23	10 June 1998	
285	Everton Cheetah	16.23	12 March 2003	
285	Jimmy Lollie	15.90	30 September 2009	
460	Droopys Clay	27.54	3 September 2002	
460	Pindi Express	27.33	11 February 2004	
476	Money Matters	27.89	3 August 1988	
476	Cadburys Hero	27.86	31 August 2019	
480	Dave's War	28.49	1979	
480	Clonee Bill	28.26	18 October 1982	
480	Peasedown Julie	28.26	9 November 1983	
480	Trade Style	28.84	23 May 1998	Silver Plume Final
480	White Santa	28.63	12 June 1998	
480	Three Wells	28.60	11 April 2001	
480	Dalcash Invader	28.57	3 September 2002	
480	Westmead Joe	28.50	19 July 2006	British Bred Produce Stakes semi-final
480	Rhyzome Wizard	28.44	21 October 2006	
480	Troys Expert	28.29	25 July 2009	British Bred Produce Stakes final
480	Mark My Words	28.28	9 July 2011	British Bred Produce Stakes heats
480	Mark My Words	28.26	15 July 2011	British Bred Produce Stakes 2nd round
480	Sids Dream	28.20	24 February 2012	
480	Shaneboy Alley	28.18	1 May 2013	Arc final
480	Johnnys Star	28.18	5 July 2013	
509	Greenfield Fox		March 1977	
509	Westmead Gold	29.98	1 July 1987	
509	DarraghCommet	29.94	4 July 1988	
509	Broadacres Butch	29.85	4 April 2001	
509	Rhyzome Wizard	29.73	26 August 2006	
509	Pine Isle	29.70	16 September 2009	
509	Little Jig	29.65	30 September 2009	Pride of the West final
509	Crusty Crab	29.59	10 November 2010	
509	Sawpit Sensation	29.43	1 May 2013	
530	Greenfield Fox	31.58	1977	
685	Bright Cut	42.38	1976	
685	Black Port	41.72	18 July 1984	
685	Droopys Kovac	41.86	31 May 2002	
685	Streaky Luvs Men	41.64	13 July 2002	
685	Shelbourne Star	40.94	11 February 2004	
695	Miss Linsey	45.42	17 June 1985	Jubilee Stakes semi-final
695	Go Go Tiger	45.37	17 June 1985	Jubilee Stakes semi-final
695	Jet Streamer	45.31	6 November 1987	
737	Wailea Flash	44.62	3 August 1988	
737	XamaxAyam Zaman	45.13	3 September 2002	
737	Streaky Luvs Men	45.11	11 July 2003	
737	Wise Maldini	44.86	20 September 2003	
737	Ballymac Swift	44.29	1 May 2013	
932	Ballymac Swift	59.12	22 May 2013	
943	Eternal Mist	60.18	1980	
943	Tartan Sarah	58.52	23 July 1984	
476 H	Gizmo Pasha	29.40	13 June 1990	
476 H	Faoides Country	29.11	18 September 1991	
480 H	Greenacre George	28.93	3 September 2002	

Former track records (pre-metric)

Yards	Greyhound	Time	Date	Notes
520	Glory Newtown	29.18	1970	
520	Houghton Ryp		1972	
520	Houghton Herald		August 1973	
550	Snobbish Flash	31.37	1969	
550	Buff Bauhus	31.31	October 1969	
550	Ballybeg Flash	30.71	29 June 1970	Silver Plume Final
575	Legane Glory	32.44	1970	
740	Bishops Miss	42.93	1970	
