= 1990 UK & Ireland Greyhound Racing Year =

British greyhound racing year

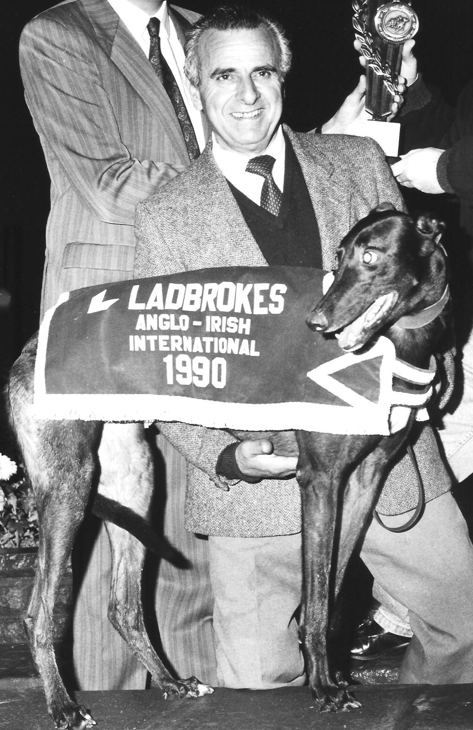
- Greyhound of the Year and Scottish Derby champion Westmead Harry with Nick Savva

The 1990 UK & Ireland Greyhound Racing Year was the 65th year of greyhound racing in the United Kingdom and the 64th year of greyhound racing in Ireland.

== Roll of honour ==
Major Winners
Award	Name of Winner
1990 English Greyhound Derby	Slippy Blue
1990 Irish Greyhound Derby	The Other Toss
1990 Scottish Greyhound Derby	Westmead Harry
Greyhound Trainer of the Year	John McGee Sr.
Greyhound of the Year	Westmead Harry
Irish Greyhound of the Year	Adraville Bridge

Trainers Championship, Hove (April 16)
Pos	Name of Trainer	Points
1st	Bill Masters	42
2nd	John McGee Sr.	41
3rd	Kenny Linzell	39
4th	Ernie Gaskin Sr.	33
5th	Linda Mullins	26
6th	Phil Rees Jr.	21

== Summary ==
The greyhound betting levy bill was heard for a second time before parliament. The first had been read in 1989. Extracts from the reading were described by Alan Meale (MP for Mansfield) - "The purpose of the Bill is straightforward; it is to amend the Betting, Gaming and Lotteries Act 1963 to enable payment of a levy to the greyhound industry from moneys already deducted from punters for that purpose by the bookmakers in off-course betting establishments. There is a great need for this legislation. Greyhound racing is the second most supported spectator sport in Britain. As census figures show, more than 5 million people support the sport by going along to tracks every week. They attend 83 tracks, 48 of which are independent and 35 of which are registered with the National Greyhound Racing Club. The membership of that club and of the independents now amounts to more than 15,000 greyhound owners. More than 20,000 greyhounds are registered and in training. At least 10,000 race meetings are held every year, accommodating over 120,000 greyhound races. Unlike the horse racing industry, the greyhound industry receives no levy money whatever; although moneys are deducted at source in betting shops off-course, throughout Britain. That is a scandal of huge proportions because 10 per cent.—10p in every pound—is deducted from bets, under the legislation to which I have referred, with the purpose of 2% of that 10% coming back into the sport. Most punters are having that money deducted fraudulently because at present the only money that goes back into the greyhound industry returns via the Legislation is in place to ensure that a similar deduction benefits horse racing. Twenty-seven percent of all off-course betting is on greyhound racing, yet not one penny of that money goes back into the industry. Instead, it all goes into the pockets of bookmakers, who do nothing for that magnificent sport". It being half-past Two o'clock, the debate stood adjourned.

In addition to this, new laws now required all sporting stadia to make safety improvements following the problems related to football. The industry felt that it was being persecuted by the government.

In Ireland the racing industry received €3.5 million in the budget but the Bord na gCon was unhappy that they would only receive €500,000.

The National Greyhound Racing Club (NGRC) released the annual returns, with totalisator turnover at £104,779,742 and attendances recorded at 4,220,906 from 5803 meetings. Track tote deduction remained at 17.5%.

Westmead Harry trained by Natalie Savva was voted Greyhound of the Year after winning the Scottish Greyhound Derby at Shawfield Stadium in a track record time, the Select Stakes, Blue Riband and Eclipse. Adraville Bridge was voted Irish Greyhound of the Year after winning the Laurels, National Produce and Dundalk International. John McGee won the Greyhound Trainer of the Year for the third successive year.

== Tracks ==
Playbell Ltd (owners of Poole) removed the greyhound track to accommodate a larger football pitch but a new Perry Barr Stadium opened, promoted by Maurice Buckland at the former athletics stadium, this was six years after the closure of the old stadium at Walsall Road.

At the end of 1988 businessmen and race horse owner Terry Robson and Harry Williams had got together and decided to take on the Sunderland stadium. Williams a respected former trainer at Brough Park helped design the new track and over £1 million was spent rebuilding the facilities. There was a new restaurant, private boxes and an application to the NGRC.

== News ==
Champion trainer John McGee joined Hackney in place of Doreen Boyce. Chris Page took over as Walthamstow Racing Manager from departing Tony Smith.

== Competitions ==
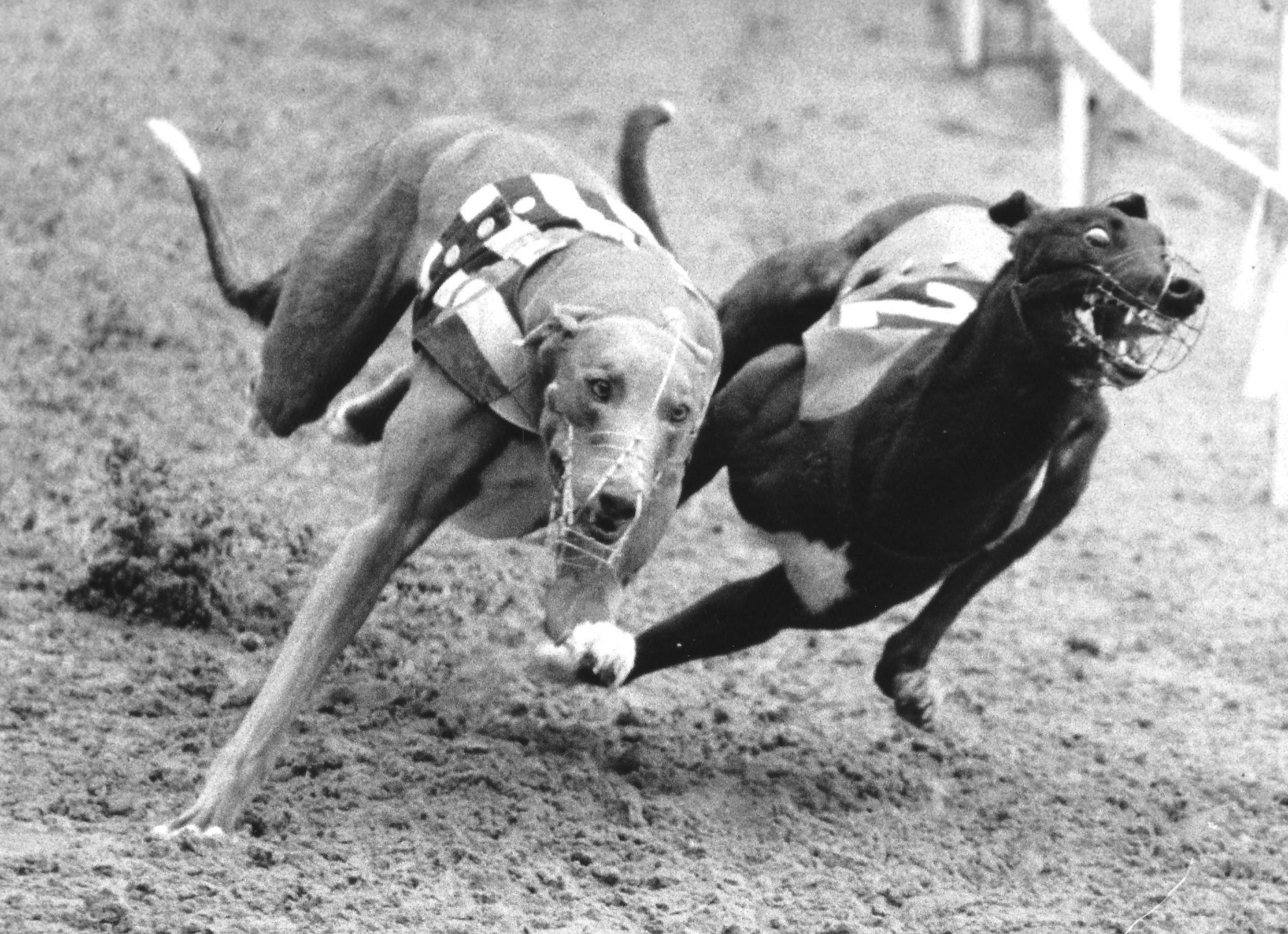
Slippy Blue who won the English Derby leads Tsetse Jimmy

A brindle greyhound called Ravage Again dominated the sprint events, the greyhound trained by Willie Frew in Scotland by Tico out of Drominidy Rose had been bought for £5,500 by Frew, for owners David Fleming and Ian Rutherford. He won heat and final of a Clonmel sprint during the festival week and then after returning to Scotland, he continued to add to his winning sequence on the northern circuit. At 16 successive wins (in June) Ladbrokes offered 300-1 that he would better Ballyregan Bob's world record of 32 successive wins. Controversy over the wager surfaced when it was revealed that Ravage Again's two wins in Ireland would not been counted.

Willie Frew sent to the greyhound to be trained in the south by Terry Dartnall, partly because he wanted to prove that he could beat the southern opposition as well. after 22 wins Ravage Again went unbeaten through the Etherington Golden Sprint at Hove, breaking the 285 metre track record in the heats and final. A close call at Hall Green ended with a short head victory before another win at Swindon. He returned north to Frew and won race 28 at Shawfield on 22 December, ending the year on course for a new world record.

Dempseys Whisper scored a classic double, the fawn dog won both the Gold Collar at Catford Stadium and Grand Prix at Walthamstow Stadium. He completed a great year getting to the St Leger and Oaks final as well and was unlucky not to win the title of greyhound of the year.

== Principal UK races ==
Daily Mirror/Sporting Life Grand National, Hall Green (Mar 30, 474m h, £5,000)
Pos	Name of Greyhound	Trainer	SP	Time	Trap
1st	Gizmo Pasha	Linda Mullins	4-6f	29.62	6
2nd	Columbkille Jet	Paddy Hancox	16-1	29.74	1
3rd	Temple Garden	W White	10-1	30.02	2
4th	Ballysway	Peter Payne	10-1	30.06	4
5th	Greenfield Fling	Paddy Coughlan	5-2	30.14	3
6th	Deputy Tim	Terry O'Sullivan	12-1	30.36	5

BBC TV Trophy, Walthamstow (April 4, 820m, £6,000)
Pos	Name of Greyhound	Trainer	SP	Time	Trap
1st	Shropshire Lass	Richard Hubble	11-4	52.48	3
2nd	Sail On Valerie	Ernie Gaskin Sr.	11-10f	52.84	6
3rd	Trans Mercedes	Maldwyn Thomas	3-1	52.86	2
4th	Clonbrin Basket	Graham Sharp	25-1	53.12	5
5th	Home Hero	Patsy Byrne	12-1	53.32	4
6th	Grabel	Paddy Hancox	25-1	53.40	1

Ladbrokes Scottish Derby, Shawfield (May 19, 500m, £10,000)
Pos	Name of Greyhound	Trainer	SP	Time	Trap
1st	Westmead Harry	Natalie Savva	5-4f	29.62+	3
2nd	Courtlough Lodge	Trevor Cobbold	10-1	30.24	2
3rd	Labana Mathew	Geoff De Mulder	7-4	30.30	5
4th	Leaders Best	Matt O'Sullivan	10-1	30.36	1
5th	Meadowbank Lad	John Flaherty	6-1	30.39	6
6th	Kilcurley Coal	John McGee Sr.	20-1	30.51	4

+Track Record

David Richardson Scurry Cup, Catford (Jul 14, 385m, £6,000)
Pos	Name of Greyhound	Trainer	SP	Time	Trap
1st	Ready Rubbed	John McGee Sr.	5-1	23.76	1
2nd	Always Drawing	Norah McEllistrim	5-1	23.96	6
3rd	Wonderbar	Gordon Thwaite	14-1	24.04	5
4th	Mandies Supreme	Derek Tidswell	1-1f	24.14	4
5th	Bettys Opinion	Alf Ellis	33-1	24.17	3
6th	Maggies Magic	Natalie Savva	9-2	00.00	2

John Humphreys Gold Collar, Catford (Sep 23, 555m, £7,500)
Pos	Name of Greyhound	Trainer	SP	Time	Trap
1st	Dempseys Whisper	Patsy Byrne	9-4f	34.84	5
2nd	Curryhills Black	Ernie Gaskin Sr.	5-2	34.98	4
3rd	Herbie Lambug	Mick Puzey	7-2	35.16	1
4th	Chicita Banana	John McGee Sr.	40-1	35.22	6
5th	Shanavulin Bingo	Ernie Gaskin Sr.	6-1	35.26	3
6th	Catsrock Dan	George Lynds	5-1	35.29	2

Websters Yorkshire Bitter Cesarewitch, Belle Vue (Sep 29, 853m, £5,000)
Pos	Name of Greyhound	Trainer	SP	Time	Trap
1st	Carlsberg Champ	Barry Silkman	5-4f	55.50	1
2nd	Clonbrin Basket	Graham Sharp	3-1	55.80	6
3rd	Culzean Blizzard	Nigel Saunders	7-1	56.04	5
4th	Always Dangerous	Ray Andrews	50-1	56.24	4
5th	Shropshire Lass	Richard Hubble	4-1	56.27	2
6th	Hot Fluff	Arthur Hitch	7-1	56.30	3

Laurent-Perrier Grand Prix, Walthamstow (Oct 13, 640m, £7,500)
Pos	Name of Greyhound	Trainer	SP	Time	Trap
1st	Dempseys Whisper	Patsy Byrne	4-11f	39.07	4
2nd	Make Magic	Ernie Gaskin Sr.	16-1	39.39	2
3rd	Sail Over	Sam Sykes	20-1	39.43	3
4th	Curryhills Press	Tom Foster	9-2	39.59	5
5th	Curryhills Brock	Ernie Gaskin Sr.	16-1	39.79	6
N/R	Hello Blackie	Roger York			

St Georges Hospital Oaks, Wimbledon (Oct 27, 480m, £6,000)
Pos	Name of Greyhound	Trainer	SP	Time	Trap
1st	Liberal Girl	Derek Knight	5-1	28.95	5
2nd	Bay Road Jill	Frank Aymes	5-1	29.17	4
3rd	Cromarty Vi	Maggie Lucas	16-1	29.33	3
4th	Appleby Lisa	Harry Dodds	9-4	29.83	2
5th	Nice and Lovely	Derek Tidswell	7-4f	29.97	6
6th	Manor Park House	Phil Rees Jr.	14-1	30.11	1

Wendy Fair St Leger, Wembley (Nov 16, 655m, £8,000)
Pos	Name of Greyhound	Trainer	SP	Time	Trap
1st	Match Point	Terry Kibble	7-1	39.92	3
2nd	Sail Over	Sam Sykes	9-2	40.08	2
3rd	Westmead Harry	Natalie Savva	11-8f	40.24	1
4th	Between Times	Gordon Hodson	25-1	40.36	5
5th	Dempseys Whisper	Patsy Byrne	9-4	40.66	6
6th	Funny Old Game	Diane Stinchcombe	33-1	40.98	4

Ike Morris Laurels, Wimbledon (Dec 23, 460m, £6,000)
Pos	Name of Greyhound	Trainer	SP	Time	Trap
1st	Concentration	Ger McKenna	4-7f	27.75	5
2nd	Slippys Guest	Norah McEllistrim	5-2	28.03	2
3rd	Dempseys Whisper	Patsy Byrne	10-1	28.21	4
4th	Itsallovernow	Ger McKenna	6-1	28.29	6
5th	Miss Jessica	Norah McEllistrim	33-1	28.31	3
N/R	Premier Major	Joanne Page			

== Totalisator returns ==
Extended content

The totalisator returns declared to the National Greyhound Racing Club for the year 1990 are listed below.

Stadium	Turnover £
London (Wimbledon)	16,337,901
London (Walthamstow)	15,964,920
Romford	9,216,479
Brighton & Hove	6,788,728
London (Catford)	5,745,804
Birmingham (Hall Green)	5,188,344
London (Wembley)	4,925,500
Manchester (Belle Vue)	4,532,605
Crayford	3,628,365
Glasgow (Shawfield)	3,010,948
Oxford	2,342,268
Edinburgh (Powderhall)	2,293,568
Canterbury	1,856,777

Stadium	Turnover £
Wolverhampton (Monmore)	1,840,626
Ramsgate	1,838,249
Newcastle (Brough Park)	1,733,522
Portsmouth	1,680,484
Yarmouth	1,591,131
Reading	1,513,816
Sheffield (Owlerton)	1,372,886
Sunderland	1,202,878
Milton Keynes	1,141,365
Peterborough	1,079,569
Bristol	998,419
Rye House	950,878
Swindon	883,760

Stadium	Turnover £
Henlow (Bedfordshire)	809,970
Nottingham	772,635
London (Hackney)	674,572
Hull (New Craven Park)	585,729
Norton Canes	453,140
Cradley Heath	448,650
Swaffham	410,471
Middlesbrough	400,629
Birmingham (Perry Barr)	292,448
Poole	221,708
Wisbech	50,000
