= 1990 English Greyhound Derby =

UK greyhound race

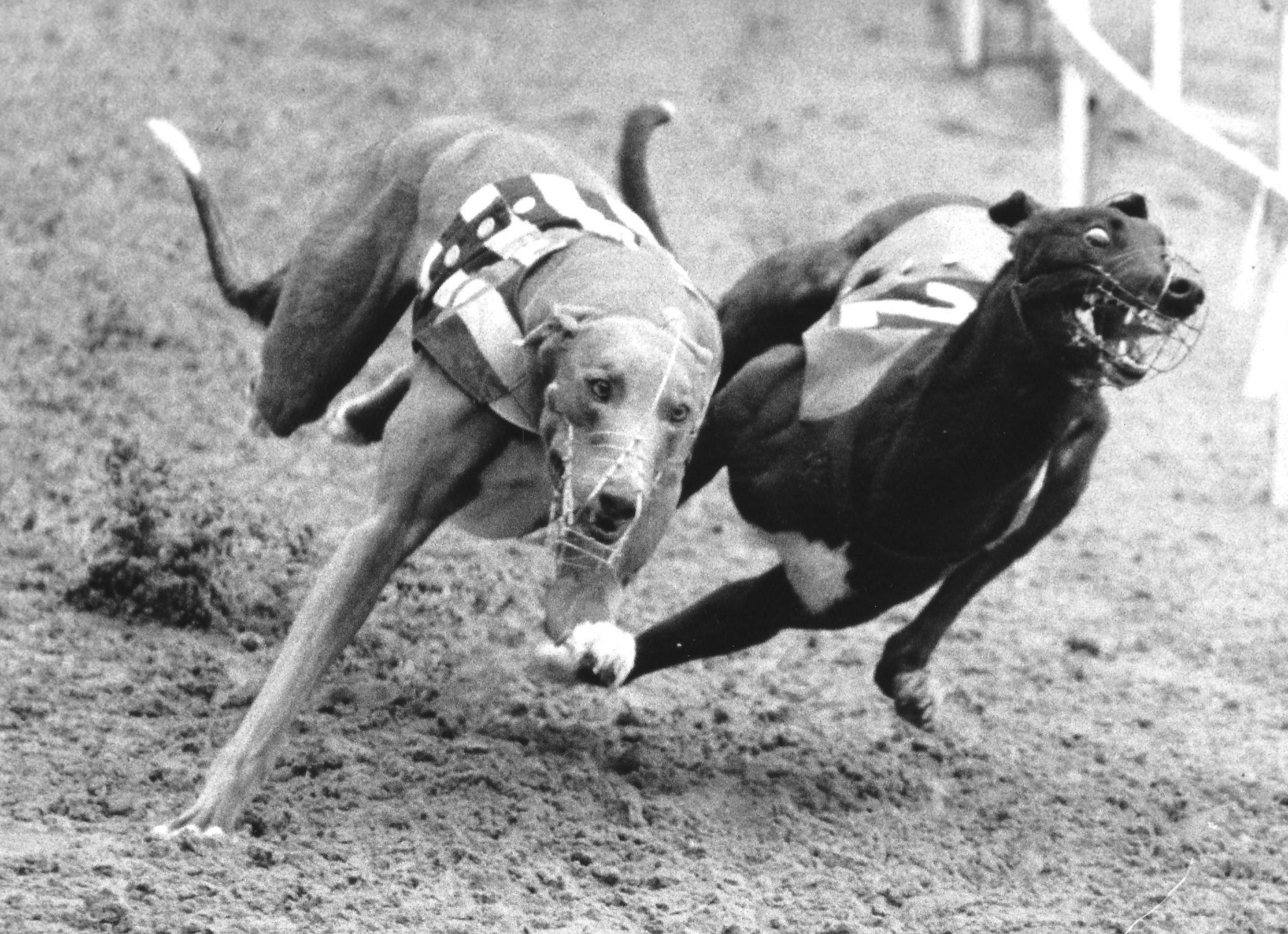
- Slippy Blue leads Tsetse Jimmy
- Location: Wimbledon Stadium
- Start date: 24 May
- End date: 23 June
- Total prize money: £40,000 (winner)

The 1990 Daily Mirror/Sporting Life Greyhound Derby took place in May and June with the final being held on 23 June 1990 at Wimbledon Stadium. The winner was Slippy Blue and the winning owner Mrs Eileen Fenn received £40,000. The competition was sponsored by the Sporting Life and Daily Mirror. Slippy Blue was bred by William McAllister from Scotland.

== Final result ==
At Wimbledon (over 480 metres):

Position	Name of Greyhound	Breeding	Trap	SP	Time	Trainer
1st	Slippy Blue	Im Slippy - Valoris	4	8-1	28.70	Kenny Linzell (Walthamstow)
2nd	Druids Johno	Whisper Wishes - Hotsauce Mistake	6	4-7f	28.96	Patsy Byrne (Canterbury)
3rd	Fair Hill Boy	Tico - Echo Duchess	1	4-1	28.98	Geoff De Mulder (Norton Canes)
4th	Fires of War	Dipmac - Marys Silver	5	10-1	29.04	Tony Meek (Oxford)
5th	Galtymore Lad	Fearless Champ - Westmead Glenda	2	20-1	30.10	Geoff De Mulder (Norton Canes)
6th	Burnt Oak Champ	Moral Support - Borris Chat	3	14-1	30.14	Paul Owens (Swindon)

=== Distances ===
3¼, head, ¾, 13½, neck (lengths)
The distances between the greyhounds are in finishing order and shown in lengths. One length is equal to 0.08 of one second.

== Competition Report ==
The leading contender for the 1990 Derby was Druids Johno half owned by Prince Edward. The half share of the black dog had been given to the prince by Patsy Byrne during a charity meeting at Canterbury; all prize money would go to the Royal Marines Benevolent Fund.

John McGee's main hope Aghadown Timmy set the fastest qualifying heat win in 28.56 sec whilst Ger McKenna had two first round winners in Itsallovernow and Beau Ami. Lyons Dean set the fastest first round time with a 28.70 and Druids Johno made it two from two.

During the second round the ante-post favourite Aghadown Timmy went out after finishing lame whilst Westmead Lodge from the Savva kennels recorded a speedy 28.77. Fires of War trained by Tony Meek lit up the third round with a fast 28.67 only to be bettered one heat later by Druids Johno in 28.66. McGee's bad luck continued when his Irish Greyhound Derby and Laurels finalist Yes Speedy was eliminated after trouble.

The quarter-finals started badly as Westmead Lodge was knocked over; this was followed by Druids Johno catching Slippy Blue to win heat two with Shanavulin Bingo and Slippys Quest taking the remaining quarter-finals. Prince Edward watched Druids Johno win his semifinal at odds on from outsiders Burnt Oak Champ and Slippy Blue before the second decider ended with Galtymore Lad beating Fires of War and Fair Hill Boy.

Patsy Byrne now a trainer in his own right after having previous finalists Easy Prince and Stouke Whisper as an owner had brought Irishman Pa Fitzgerald to run his kennel and the pair trained Druids Johno, the odds on favourite for the Derby final. As the traps rose Slippy Blue trained by Kenny Linzell and owned by Eileen Fenn went into an early lead and maintained it to the finish. The blue dog had been backed ante post at 100-1 and 20-1 on course during the first show of the final. Druids Johno finished runner-up.

== Quarter-finals ==
Heat 1 (Jun 12)
Pos	Name	SP	Time
1st	Demesne Chance	7-2	28.79
2nd	Burnt Oak Champ	16-1	29.19
3rd	Little Spot	33-1	29.27
4th	Itasllovernow	7-2	29.81
5th	Westmead Lodge	11-8f	00.00
6th	Choice of Game	9-2	00.00

Heat 2 (Jun 12)
Pos	Name	SP	Time
1st	Druids Johno	11-10f	28.82
2nd	Slippy Blue	6-1	29.02
3rd	Attractive Son	25-1	29.10
4th	Bawnard It	20-1	29.22
5th	Lyons Dean	5-4	29.23
6th	Beau Ami	20-1	29.39

Heat 3 (Jun 12)
Pos	Name	SP	Time
1st	Shanavulin Bingo	3-1	28.84
2nd	Fair Hill Boy	11-8f	28.96
3rd	Daring Duke	33-1	29.08
4th	Barefoot Band	5-1	29.28
5th	Moral Success	4-1	29.54
6th	Kilcannon Bullet	8-1	29.84

Heat 4 (Jun 12)
Pos	Name	SP	Time
1st	Slippys Quest	6-4f	28.83
2nd	Fires Of War	3-1	28.95
3rd	Galtymore Lad	8-1	29.11
4th	Gulleen Whisper	25-1	29.12
5th	Swing The Mood	7-4	29.30
6th	Ballybrown Model	20-1	29.72

== Semifinals ==
First Semifinal (Jun 16)
Pos	Name of Greyhound	SP	Time	Trainer
1st	Druids Johno	4-11f	28.79	Byrne
2nd	Burnt Oak Champ	25-1	29.05	Owens
3rd	Slippy Blue	7-1	29.19	Linzell
4th	Daring Duke	40-1	29.41	Honeysett
5th	Shanavulin Bingo	9-2	29.49	Gaskin Sr.
6th	Little Spot	33-1	29.55	Kinchett

Second Semifinal (Jun 16)
Pos	Name of Greyhound	SP	Time	Trainer
1st	Galtymore Lad	20-1	29.12	De Mulder
2nd	Fires Of War	5-1	29.13	Meek
3rd	Fair Hill Boy	10-1	29.23	De Mulder
4th	Demesne Chance	7-4	29.31	Smith
5th	Slippys Quest	5-4f	29.61	McEllistrim
6th	Attractive Son	25-1	29.65	McKenna

== See also ==
- 1990 UK & Ireland Greyhound Racing Year
