= The Grand Prix =

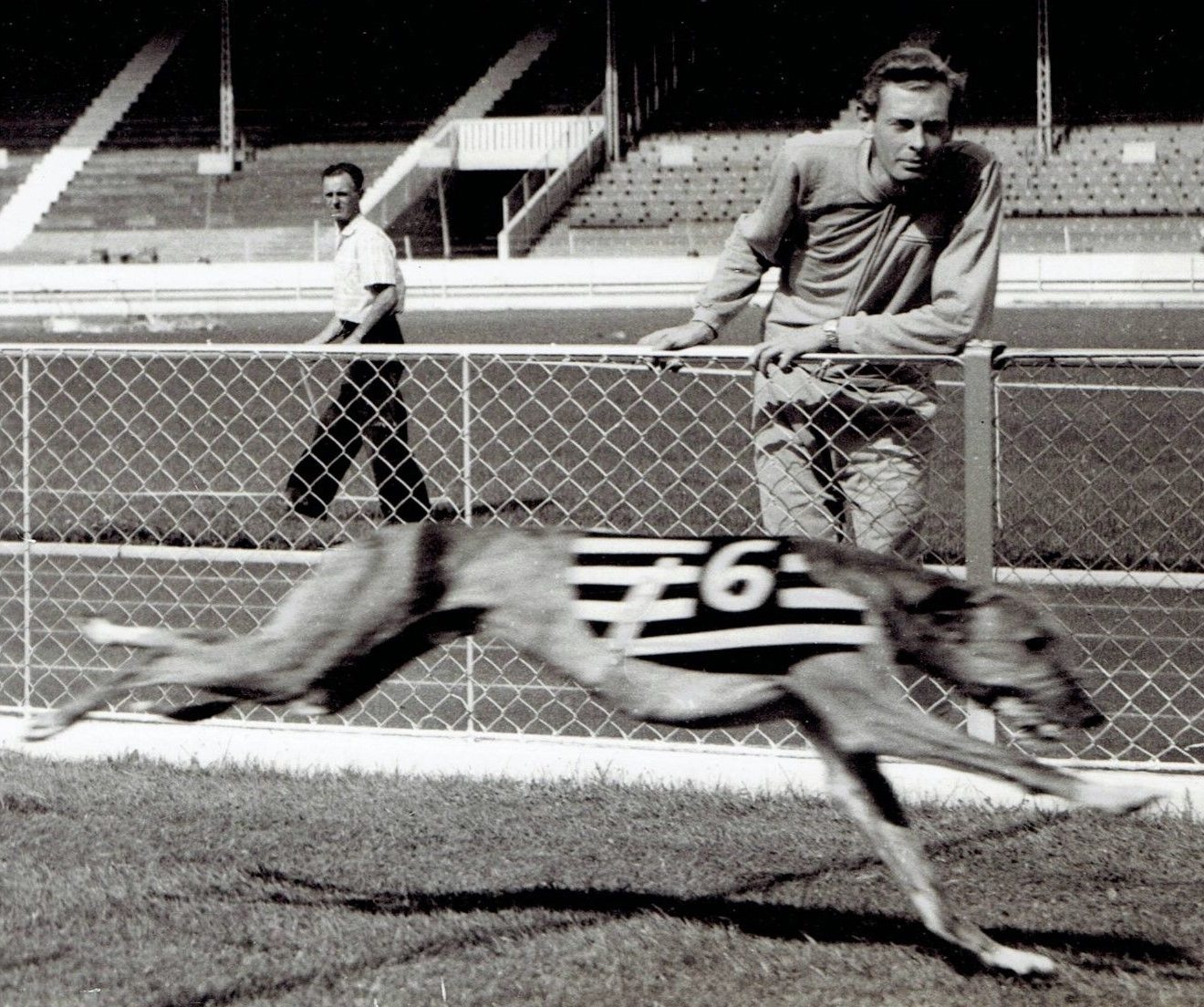
- The 1961 champion Clonalvy Romance
- Location: Walthamstow Stadium
- Inaugurated: 1945
- Final run: 2007
- Sponsor: Victor Chandler Bookmakers

Race information
- Distance: 640 metres
- Surface: Sand

The Grand Prix was a classic greyhound competition held at Walthamstow.

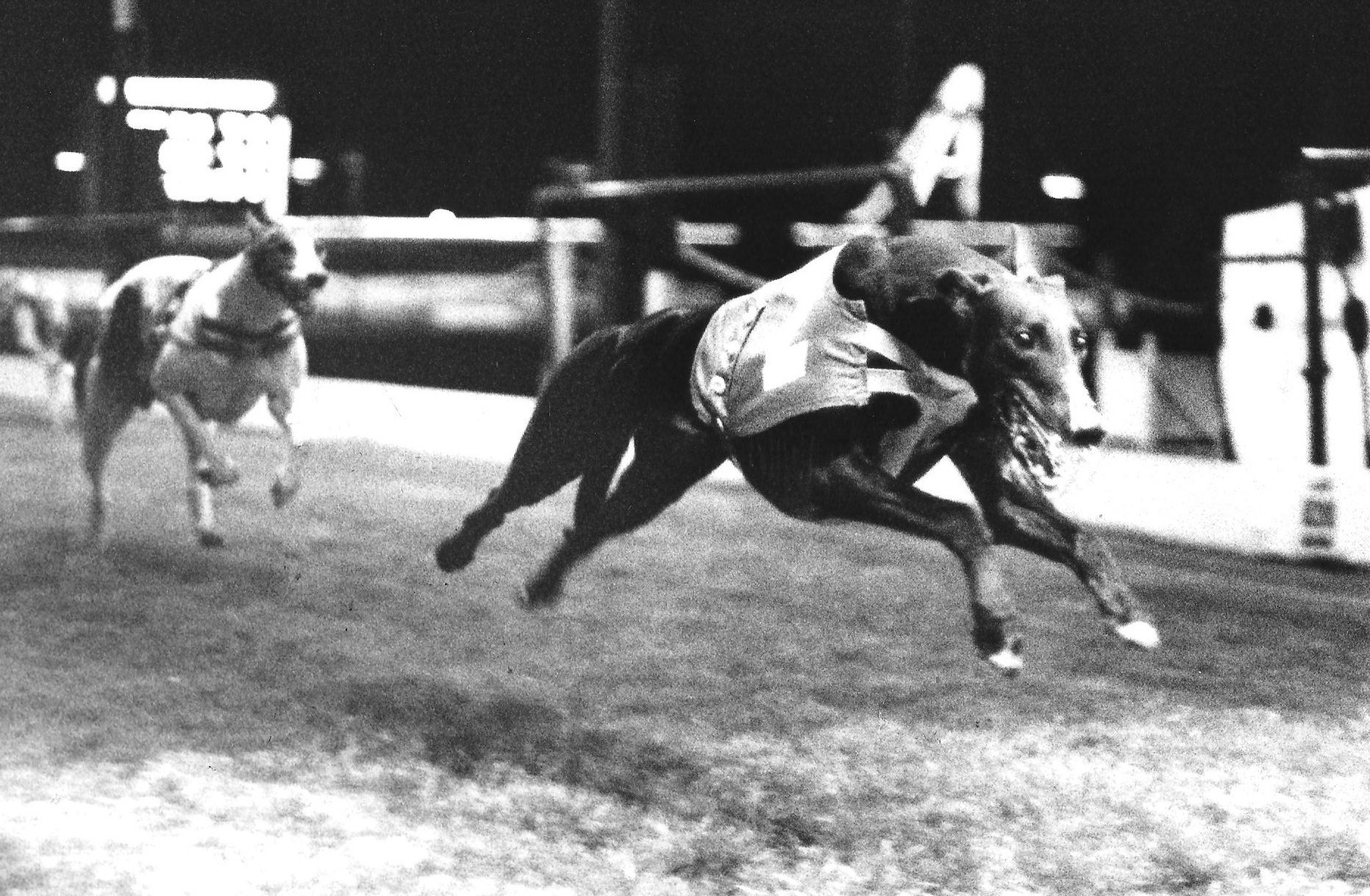
1989 Waltham Abbey breaks the track record during the second round

It was first run in 1945 and in 1971 it was granted classic status. The race came to an end following the closure of Walthamstow in 2008. The race is not to be confused with the Arena Racing Company Grand Prix held at Sunderland.

The competition was not run from 1952 until 1953 due to insufficient entries and again from 1964 to 1965. The event was cancelled in 1965 following the refusal by the National Greyhound Racing Club to allow a change in race distance.

== Venue and Distances ==
- 1945–1958 (Walthamstow 525 yards)
- 1960–1963 (Walthamstow 500 yards)
- 1966–1974 (Walthamstow 600 yards)
- 1976–2007 (Walthamstow 640 metres)

== Sponsors ==
- 1994-1998 Laurent-Perrier
- 2001–2007 Victor Chandler Bookmakers

== Past winners ==
Year	Winner	Breeding	Trainer	Time	SP	Notes
1945	Magic Bohemian	Jesmond Cutlet – Magic Pool	Leslie Reynolds (Wembley)	30.03 sec	10-11f	
1946	Tonycus	Manhattan Midnight – Dashing B	Leslie Reynolds (Wembley)	30.19 sec	6–1	
1947	Mondays News	Orlucks Best – Monday Next	Sidney Orton (Wimbledon)	30.41 sec	2–1	
1948	Ruby Cut	Ruby Border – Volcut	John Bott (Private)	30.31 sec	11–4	
1949	Red Wind	Dysertmore Prince – Light Biddy	Frank Davis (Private)	29.82 sec	10-11f	
1950	Arrow Boy	Dew Bob – Daintys Blue Grass	Jack Harvey (Wembley)	30.28 sec	5–1	
1951	Rushton Smutty	Mad Tanist – Summer Frock	Frank Johnson (Private)	29.80 sec	4-6f	
1954	Rushton Spot	Rushton News – Rushton Panda	Frank Johnson (Private)	29.57 sec	100–30	
1955	Duet Leader	Champion Prince – Derryluskin Lady	Tom 'Paddy' Reilly (Walthamstow)	29.42 sec	13-8f	
1956	Land of Song	Fire Prince – Old Blarney Gift	Bob Burls (Wembley)	29.70 sec	7–2	
1957	Klcaskin Kern	Magourna Reject – Pavona	Tony Dennis (Private)	29.25 sec	8-11f	
1958	Granthamian	Barrowside – Silver Splash	Jack Harvey (Wembley)	29.98 sec	1-1f	
1960	Dunstown Paddy	Champion Prince – Geffs Linnett	Tom 'Paddy' Reilly (Walthamstow)	28.26 sec	11–4	
1961	Clonalvy Romance	Solar Prince – Asmena	W Taylor (White City)	28.57 sec	9–2	
1963	Mondays Ranger	Toast The Champ – Mondays Soprano	Tom 'Paddy' Reilly (Walthamstow)	28.03 sec	4-5f	
1966	Westpark Bison	The Glen Abbey – Little Scroll	Barney O'Connor (Walthamstow)	40.14 sec	8-11f	
1968	Carmen John	Crazy Parachute – Creggandoveskey	J Millis (Private)	41.16 sec	10–1	
1969	Chame Sparrow	Mad Era – Avenue East	Barney O'Connor (Walthamstow)	40.75 sec	6–1	
1970	Baton	Annard – Pine Blacktop	Jack Durkin (Walthamstow)	40.39 sec	9-4f	
1971	Breachs Buzzard	Maryville Hi – Breach's Blizzard	Colin McNally (Perry Barr)	40.00 sec	4-5f	
1973	Pendys Mermaid	Merry Newdown – Linnetts Venture	Dave Geggus (Walthamstow)	40.65 sec	11-8f	
1974	Ballyglass Hope	Faithful Hope – Deise Ivory	Don Thornton (Private)	40.58 sec	7–1	
1976	Manderlay King	Crazy Top – Shandaroba	Geoff De Mulder (Hall Green)	40.21 sec	9–2	
1977	Paradise Spectre	Spectre – Paradise Wonder	Pat Mullins (Private)	40.19 sec	6-4f	
1978	Paradise Spectre	Spectre – Paradise Wonder	Pat Mullins (Private)	40.03 sec	3-1jf	
1979	Frame That	Ritas Choice – The Grand Love	Ted Dickson (Slough)	39.57 sec	11–2	
1980	Sport Promoter	Breakaway Town – Kensington Queen	Pat Mullins (Cambridge)	40.17 sec	2-1jf	
1981	Rathduff Solara	Ivy Hall Solo – Rathduff Gazelle	Tony Dennis (Southend)	40.71 sec	2-1jf	
1982	Huberts Shade	Luminous Lad – Huberts Fate	Adam Jackson (Wembley)	39.73 sec	11-8f	
1983	Flying Duke	Gaily Noble – Shans Fantasia	Paddy Coughlan (Crayford)	40.49 sec	4–1	
1984	Sunrise Sonny	Armagh Rocket – Kerry Wedding	George Curtis (Hove)	40.00 sec	25–1	
1985	Slaneyside Gold	Sand Man – Prince of Rocks	Jim Sherry (Walthamstow)	40.00 sec	5–1	
1986	Westmead Move	Whisper Wishes – Westmead Tania	Nick Savva (Private)	39.35 sec	10-11f	
1987	Olivers Wish	Whisper Wishes – Westmead Tania	Nick Savva (Private)	39.86 sec	7–2	
1988	Digby Bridge	Yellow Band – Ballylough Judy	John Malcolm (Hall Green)	40.14 sec	50–1	
1989	Waltham Abbey	Manorville Sand – Mona Lisa	Ernie Gaskin Sr. (Private)	39.91 sec	2–1	
1990	Dempseys Whisper	Whisper Wishes – Lemon Gem	Patsy Byrne (Canterbury)	39.07 sec	4-11f	
1991	Dempseys Whisper	Whisper Wishes – Lemon Gem	Patsy Byrne (Canterbury)	39.20 sec	2-1f	
1992	Westmead Darkie	Airmount Grand – Westmead Move	Nick Savva (Private)	39.36 sec	2-1f	
1993	Redwood Girl	Ardfert Sean – Redwood Sue	Ernie Gaskin Sr. (Walthamstow)	39.89 sec	5–1	
1994	Redwood Girl	Ardfert Sean – Redwood Sue	Ernie Gaskin Sr. (Walthamstow)	39.74 sec	2–1	
1995	Suncrest Sail	Low Sail – Sarahs Surprise	Charlie Lister OBE (Private)	39.62 sec	11-10f	
1996	Spring Rose	Galtymore Lad – Rachels Baby	Charlie Lister OBE (Nottingham)	39.05 sec	4-7f	Track record
1997	El Grand Senor	Leaders Minstrel – Without Equal	Linda Mullins (Walthamstow)	39.38 sec	12–1	
1998	Dans Sport	New Level – Any Band	Charlie Lister OBE (Private)	39.79 sec	6–1	
1999	Palace Issue	Deerpark Jim – Clear Issue	Linda Mullins (Walthamstow)	40.32 sec	9-4f	
2000	Palace Issue	Deerpark Jim – Clear Issue	Linda Mullins (Walthamstow)	39.32 sec	1-3f	
2001	Slick Tom	Toms The Best – Slick Mel	Owen McKenna (Wimbledon)	40.02 sec	9–2	
2002	Sheriff Bow Wow	Frisby Flashing – Spilt Milk	John Mullins (Walthamstow)	40.05 sec	8–1	
2003	Special Trick	Spiral Nikita – Castlerea Delia	Linda Jones (Walthamstow)	39.85 sec	4–1	
2004	Ronnies Flight	Sonic Flight – Tina at Last	Linda Jones (Walthamstow)	40.03 sec	11-8f	
2005	Clonbrin Show	Late Late Show – Clonbrin Jewel	Mick Puzey (Walthamstow)	39.55 sec	5-2f	
2006	January Tiger	Droopys Vieri – January Vixen	Mark Wallis (Walthamstow)	39.47 sec	9–2	
2007	Foulden Special	Droopys Kewell –Smoking Baby	Derek Knight (Hove)	39.45 sec	1-1f	

Discontinued
