= William Chandler (bookmaker) =

British bookmaker

- Born: 30 November 1880; Hoxton, London, England
- Died: 25 March 1946 (aged 65); Essex, England
- Occupation: Bookmaker
- Known for: Builder and owner of Walthamstow Stadium
- Children: 8
- Relatives: Victor Chandler (grandson)

William George Chandler (1880–1946) was a British bookmaker, and the owner of Walthamstow Stadium, a greyhound racing track in north east London.

== Early life ==
William Chandler was born in Hoxton, London.

== Career ==
He became the leading bookmaker at White City Greyhounds based in London's White City Stadium.

Chandler may have started an illegal betting business in the 1920s, was a shareholder and director in a greyhound racetrack in Hackney Wick.

In the early 1930, Chandler sold his shares to buy Crooked Billet, an unlicensed greyhound track in Walthamstow, which he redeveloped as Walthamstow Stadium.

== Personal life ==
=== Children ===
Chandler had eight children, including five sons. After his death in 1946, Charles and Percy managed Walthamstow Stadium, and the bookmaking business passed to Victor and Jack (now BetVictor), and Ronnie trained greyhounds.

Charles Chandler became general manager of Walthamstow Stadium, and married Frances Morrill, one of three sisters who all married Chandler brothers, Betty to Victor and Ann to Percy. Percy was catering Manager and died in 1984. Frances Chandler (1919 - 4 February 2015) was a leading greyhound owner, and her dogs included Greyhound of the Year Magourna Reject and 1971 Irish Greyhound Derby winner Sole Aim.

=== Grandchildren ===
Victor Sr. died in 1974, and his son Victor Chandler Jr. took charge of the bookmaking business. Charles Sr. died in 1976 and his son Charles Henry Chandler Jr. was a director of Waltamstow, chairman of Racecourse Promoters and a Director of the Greyhound Racing Association. Jack Alan Chandler, William George Chandler, Philip Henry Chandler, Robert Douglas Chandler, Vicki Ermelli (née Chandler) and Annie Aslett (née Chandler) were all directors of Walthamstow Stadium.

Philip was also the manager of Charlie Chan's nightclub underneath the stadium, which ran from 1984 until its closure in 2007.
