= Linda Jones (greyhound trainer) =

British greyhound racing professional trainer

Personal information
- Born: 1948 (age 76–77)
- Occupation: Greyhound Trainer

Sport
- Sport: Greyhound racing

Achievements and titles
- National finals: Classic/Feature wins: Trainers Championship (1999); Laurels (2000); Pall Mall (2001); East Anglian Derby (2000); Eclipse (1999); Golden Sprint (2001, 2002); Kent Derby (2001); Arc (2002); Essex Vase (1999, 2002); The Grand Prix (2003, 2004)

Linda Eileen Jones (born 1948) is a retired English greyhound trainer. She is a twice champion trainer of Great Britain and was a leading trainer during the 1990s.

== Personal life ==
Linda was born in July 1948 and married Doug Jones. In 1989 the pair moved to the village of Lakenheath in Suffolk and formed the Imperial Kennels.

They later employed Mark Wallis in 1990, as their assistant trainer and he married their daughter Sarah before taking over the kennels on Linda's retirement. Patrick Janssens was also employed by the kennel.

== Career ==
Linda initially raced at Swaffham Stadium, Yarmouth Stadium and Mildenhall Stadium before gaining a contract at Romford Stadium in 1994.

In 1998 the kennel recorded 138 open race winners, finished 7th in the UK standings and qualified as first reserve for the 1999 Trainers Championship at Walthamstow Stadium. Linda a 100-1 outsider was called into the meeting and created a major shock by winning the title.

Secret Crystal, finished fourth in the 1999 English Greyhound Derby before on 1 November 1999 Linda joined the sport's leading track Walthamstow from Romford and the Imperial Kennels grew in stature and began to secure major wins including the Essex Vase and the Eclipse.

In 2000 she had 212 open race winners and won the East Anglian Derby and Laurels in addition to finishing third in the 2000 English Greyhound Derby with Greenfield Deal behind the legendary Rapid Ranger.

In 2001 she became champion trainer of Great Britain with 235 open race winners and Kinda Magic won three major races. This was followed by 323 open race winners and a second Champion Trainer title in 2002.

== Retirement ==
Due to ill health Linda retired in 2005, handing the kennels to Mark Wallis and her daughter Sarah. She has remained active within the industry sitting on the board of the Trainers Association.
