= BetVictor =

Online gambling company

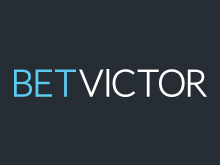
- Company type: Private
- Industry: Gambling
- Founded: 1946
- Founder: William Chandler
- Headquarters: Gibraltar
- Key people: Andreas Meinrad (CEO), Victor Chandler (Former Chairman)
- Products: Sports betting, online casino
- Website: www.betvictor.com

BetVictor, founded in 1946, is an online gambling company based in Gibraltar, owned by British businessman and racehorse owner Michael Tabor. It provides services such as sports betting and online casinos.

== History ==
The company was founded by William Chandler, the proprietor of Walthamstow Stadium, a greyhound racing track located in the London Borough of Waltham Forest in East London in 1931. Victor Sr. and Jack took over the bookmaking business following William Chandler's passing in 1946. Victor Sr. died unexpectedly in 1974, and his son Victor Jr., who was then employed in the hospitality industry in Spain, assumed control of the business.

In 1998, the headquarters relocated to Gibraltar to avoid the UK’s gambling taxes.

The company underwent a rebranding in 2004, changing its name to "VC Bet," but eventually reverted to "Victor Chandler" in late 2008. In 2012, to ensure consistency and recognition across international markets, the company underwent another rebranding and adopted the name "BetVictor". In May 2014, Michael Tabor, a businessman and major shareholder of Victor Chandler International, assumed control of the company.

In September 2021, BetVictor disclosed its collaboration with Quantum Metric, aimed at advancing and enhancing consumer-centric products.

== BetVictor business-to-business ==
In 2020, German newspaper BILD confirmed that it had started a cooperation with BetVictor to launch BildBet. Later in 2020, BetVictor made an agreement with Parimatch to be their white label provider in the UK. On September 9, 2021, BetVictor announced a partnership with Global Media & Entertainment to relaunch HeartBingo, their UK gaming brand. In August 2022, BetVictor partnered with Talksport to launch a new UK sports betting brand, talkSPORT BET.

== Regulatory actions ==
In February 2022 BetVictor faced a £2 million (€2.4/$2.7 million) regulatory action after the UK Gambling Commission investigation revealed fairness, social responsibility, and anti-money laundering failures. The operator will pay the money as part of a settlement with the commission, and the settlement money will go to the National Strategy to Reduce Gambling Harms.

In 2023, the UK Advertising Standards Authority investigated a BetVictor Facebook ad featuring images of FC Barcelona players Jordi Alba and Sergio Busquets. They ruled that the advert had breached the code of practice as it was likely to have a strong appeal to under-18s.
