= Victor Chandler =

British businessman, bookmaker (born 1951)

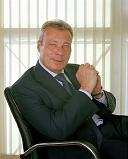
- Born: 18 April 1951 (age 74)
- Education: Highgate School; Millfield School
- Occupation: Bookmaker
- Title: Former chairman, Victor Chandler International
- Relatives: William Chandler (grandfather)
- Website: www.betvictor.com

Victor William Chandler (born 18 April 1951) is a British businessman, bookmaker, and the former chairman of Victor Chandler International.

== Early life ==
Chandler is the son of Victor Chandler Sr, and the grandson of William Chandler, who founded the family's bookmaking business and owned London's Walthamstow Stadium. He inherited a 20% stake in Walthamstow Stadium when his father Victor Sr. died in 1974.

== Off-shore bookmaking ==
Victor Chandler is often credited as the first bookmaker to recognise the importance of online gambling, as well as being the first to move his gaming business offshore.

In the early 1990s, Chandler began to accept football wagers from far-eastern clients and, in doing so, he recognised the potential growth in foreign markets. He opened up an office in Antigua to enable these clients to bet without the need to pay UK tax.

In the UK, punters were required to pay a 9% betting tax, but in 1996 Chandler obtained a betting licence in Gibraltar and in 1999 moved his entire business there. Over the next decade the company grew quickly and now employs over 400 people, making it one of the largest private employers on the Rock. Victor Chandler has offered free betting from £5, and in 2001 the then-Chancellor of the Exchequer Gordon Brown announced that he was scrapping UK betting tax.

== Horse ownership ==
Chandler has owned many racehorses over the past three decades in United Kingdom, South Africa & United States. Following some success over the years, Chandler formed a syndicate called "Men in Our Position" which owned the 2009 Cheltenham Triumph Hurdle winner Zaynar, trained by Nicky Henderson. Zaynar re-appeared on 21 November 2009 at Ascot Racecourse where he demolished a top-class field in winning the Coral Ascot Hurdle by 6 lengths as reported by the Racing Post. Zaynar was then aimed at the Champion Hurdle, for which he was one of the Ante-Post favourites for the race. After running a galant race Zaynar finished third in the race.

== Personal wealth ==
In the 2009 Sunday Times Rich List Chandler was ranked 362nd with a fortune estimated at £150 million, declining by more than half from the previous year's estimation of £365 million.

== Lucian Freud friendship ==
In an article in the Observer in June 2008 Chandler spoke of his friendship with the artist Lucian Freud, and mentioned the portrait of Victor which Freud completed and sold for £4.5m in 2006.

== Nottingham Forest ==
In July 2009 Chandler agreed to become the main sponsor of Nottingham Forest F.C. for a reported "significant six-figure fee". As part of his sponsorship he offered to pay for the following year's season tickets for Forest fans who opened an online account should Forest win the league. At the time of the offer Forest were rated as 80/1 outsiders to do this, but after a run of 19 games undefeated, Forest became second in the Championship of January 2010. Chandler claimed Forest winning the league would cost him approximately £6m. After a poor March and April Forest's chances of winning the league receded and they instead qualified for the Football League play-offs where they were eliminated by Blackpool at the semi-final stage.
