= Kenny Linzell =

British greyhound racing professional trainer

Personal information
- Born: 2nd quarter 1937 Orsett, Essex, England
- Occupation: Greyhound Trainer

Sport
- Sport: Greyhound racing

Achievements and titles
- National finals: Derby wins: English Derby (1990); Scottish Derby (1985); Classic/Feature wins: Cesarewitch (1989); Select Stakes (1985); East Anglian Derby (1986)

Kenneth W. Linzell (born 1937) also known as Kenny or Ken, is a former British greyhound trainer. He was UK Champion trainer in 1985 and twice winner of the Trainers Championship.

== Profile ==
Linzell started training on the independent circuit taking runners regularly to Rayleigh Weir Stadium, Hinckley Greyhound Stadium and the West Suffolk Greyhound Stadium. After gaining a National Greyhound Racing Club licence he had attachments at Ipswich Stadium, Southend Stadium and Hackney Wick Stadium.

Linzell's Burton Lodge kennels were based in Wickford, Essex and he secured a leading position within the industry when contracted at Walthamstow Stadium in 1983. In 1983 he trained Glatton Grange who won over £23,000 in prize money winning the Greyhound Breeders Forum Stakes, the British Breeders Forum Stakes and the International. The following year the brindle dog finished runner-up in the St Leger and reached the Grand Prix final.

Linzell was Greyhound Trainer of the Year in 1985 and also won the Scottish Greyhound Derby and reached the 1985 English Greyhound Derby final with Smokey Pete.

He later won two Trainers Championship in 1985 and 1986 before winning the 1989 Cesarewitch with Minnies Siren. One year later he won the 1990 English Greyhound Derby with Slippy Blue. Also during 1990 he was represented in the Irish Greyhound Derby final by Rosden Speedy.

Linzell made the decision to leave Walthamstow in 1991, due to the track's trainer policy and he joined Romford Greyhound Stadium. Romford's racing schedule became too demanding and Linzell retired from the sport in 1999. He sold his Burton Lodge kennels to the Miles family, who then leased them to Linzell's former head man Paul Young. Brian Clemenson was also a former head man for Linzell.
