= Walthamstow Stadium =

Former stadium in Walthamstow, East London

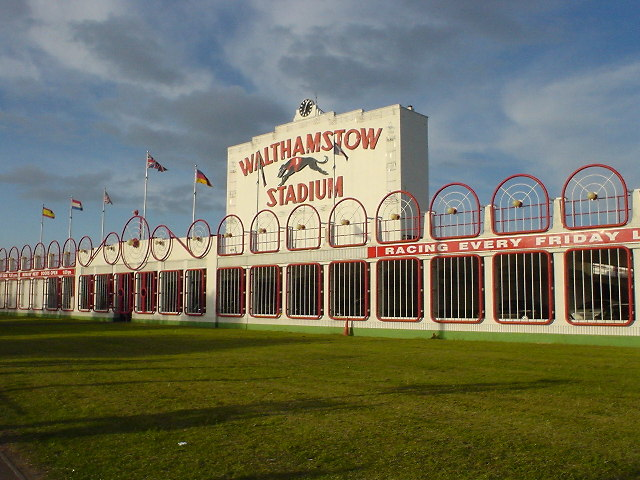
- The front facade in 2005
- Interactive map of Walthamstow Stadium
- Location: Chingford Road, London, E4 8SJ; England
- Coordinates: 51.603759°N 0.015948°E
- Date opened: 15 April 1933; 92 years ago
- Date closed: 16 August 2008; 17 years ago
- Race type: Greyhound racing

Listed Building – Grade II
- Official name: Entrance Range Including Tote Board At Walthamstow Stadium
- Designated: 23 May 2007
- Reference no.: 1391978

Walthamstow Stadium was a greyhound racing track in the London Borough of Waltham Forest in east London. It was regarded as the leading greyhound racing stadium in Britain following the closure of White City in 1984. The stadium closed on 16 August 2008.

== Greyhound racing ==
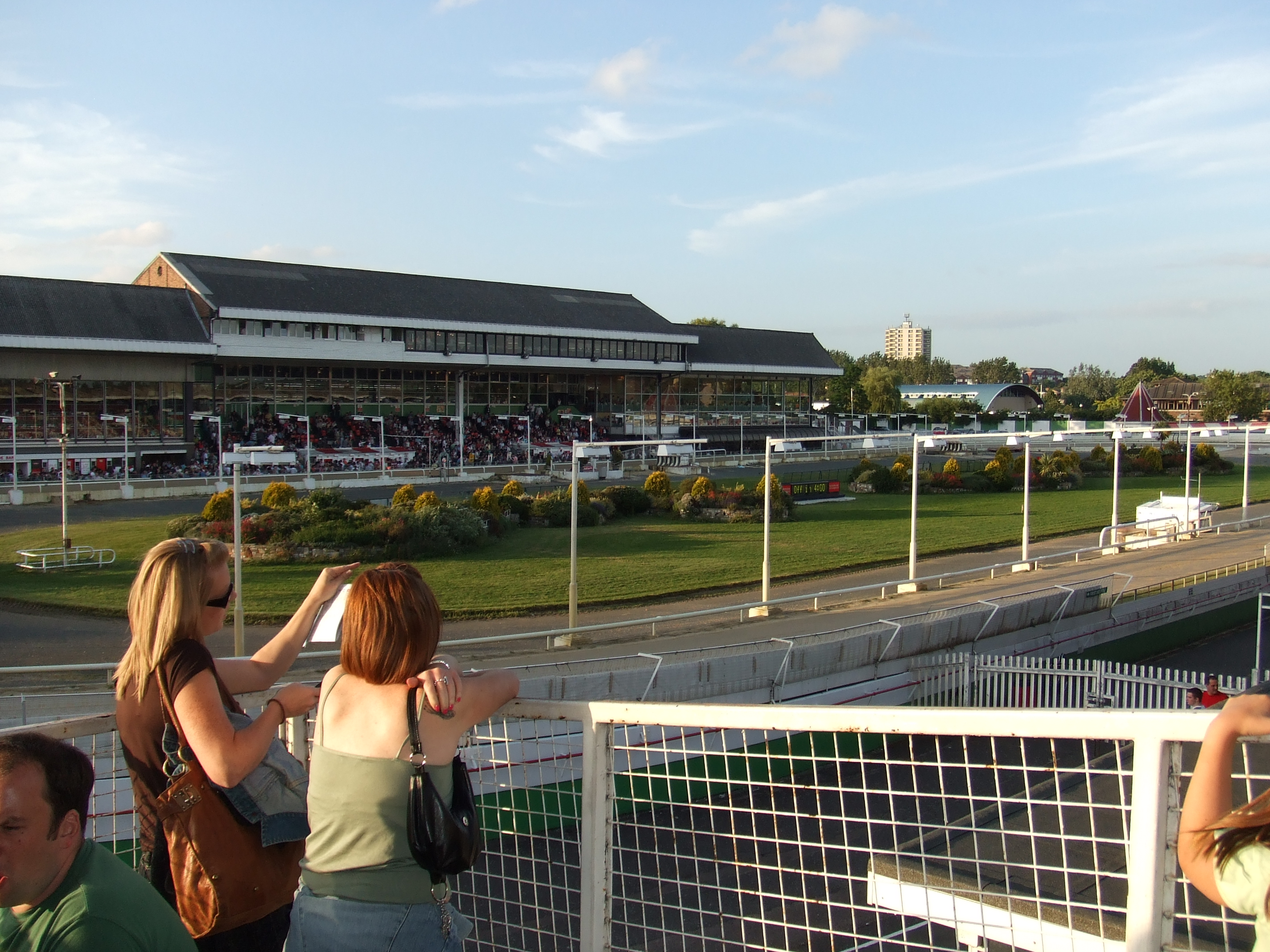
Inside Walthamstow Stadium in 2008

=== Crooked Billet ===
In the early part of the 20th century the Myrtle Grove sports ground was built and used by the Walthamstow Grange Football Club from 1908. By 1929 the ground hosted greyhound racing for the first time and was known as the Crooked Billet Greyhound and whippet track (named after the nearby Crooked Billet public house). The track was an independent track, unaffiliated to a governing body. In 1931, William Chandler, a bookmaker by trade, decided to build on the existing independent track. Chandler also had shares in the Hackney Wick Stadium.

=== Opening ===
It cost Chandler £24,000 to buy the site and the Art Deco parapet entrance was built in 1932 with the clock tower and totalisator board being designed by Thomas & Edge Ltd. builders of Woolwich. The grand official opening was on Monday 19 June 1933, opened by Jack Kid Berg and in which aviator Amy Johnson presented a trophy as a guest.

=== Pre-war history ===
From 1931 to 1943 the stadium underwent three major rebuilds as Chandler strove for the perfect stadium. The kennels and paddock were situated between the third and fourth bends with a veterinary room and trainers room at either end. Between the first and second bends was the Senior Club sandwiched by two stands. The back straight had one large covered stand but the home straight had another Senior Club which was located under the upstairs ballroom and dance band. There were two tea rooms and a wet and dry bar in the main grandstand and sixteen tote buildings. The track was 440 yards in circumference and was described as the slowest and most difficult course in London. The hare was an 'Inside Sumner' and there was an artesian well near the fourth bend used for watering the track.

On 13 January 1938 the track raced under National Greyhound Racing Club rules for the first time. In 1941 the stadium introduced its first major competition, called 'The Test'. The trainers and greyhounds attached to Walthamstow were situated in kennels to the north called 'The Limes' in Sewardstone Road not far from Epping Forest. Walthamstow were unusual in the fact that they hired several female trainers at the time; a practice attributed to the influence of Frances Chandler (the wife of William's son Charles). Frances was a leading greyhound owner in the industry. Female trainers employed during the period mentioned included Mrs F Deathbridge, Meg Fairbrass, Miss J Griffiths and Miss B Lark. Wartime champion greyhound Ballynennan Moon won the Stewards Cup and broke the track record in 1942.

=== Late 1940s ===
As the war ended the stadium hosted Winston Churchill as he addressed 20,000 people when canvassing support for re-election. A major event called the Grand Prix was inaugurated in 1945 and later became a classic race. Towards the end of 1946 William 'Billy' Chandler died leaving equal shares of the business to his children. Charles became the new Managing Director, Victor snr (whose son is Victor Chandler) and Jack were concentrating on their bookmaking businesses and Ronnie was training greyhounds in Ireland. The industry and Walthamstow experienced an extraordinary boom in business with tote turnover in excess of £7 million in 1946.

In 1948 the track had their first English Greyhound Derby finalist in Doughery Boy and two more female trainers Noreen Collin and Miss K Sanderson joined in 1950. Joe Coral (founder of Coral Empire) stood as a track bookmaker before branching into betting offices in the sixties. In 1952 the neon lighting greyhound sign was added to commemorate the 1952 Coronation, the same year the land which housed the Salisbury Hall Manor House (once owned by Henry VIII) was purchased by Chandler, demolished and used as the car park for the stadium.

=== 1950s and 1960s ===
Tom 'Paddy' Reilly, Dave Geggus and Barney O’Connor became three very prominent trainers at the track and in the industry; Reilly replaced Noreen Collin in 1953. Other trainers at the time were Jack Durkin, Kevin O'Neil and Reg 'String' Marsh. In 1963 the track introduced a closed circuit television system and in 1965 chromotography (a drug testing unit) was first used at Walthamstow in their purpose built lab. In 1968 the bends were sanded and banked producing a much faster surface than all-grass.

=== 1970s ===
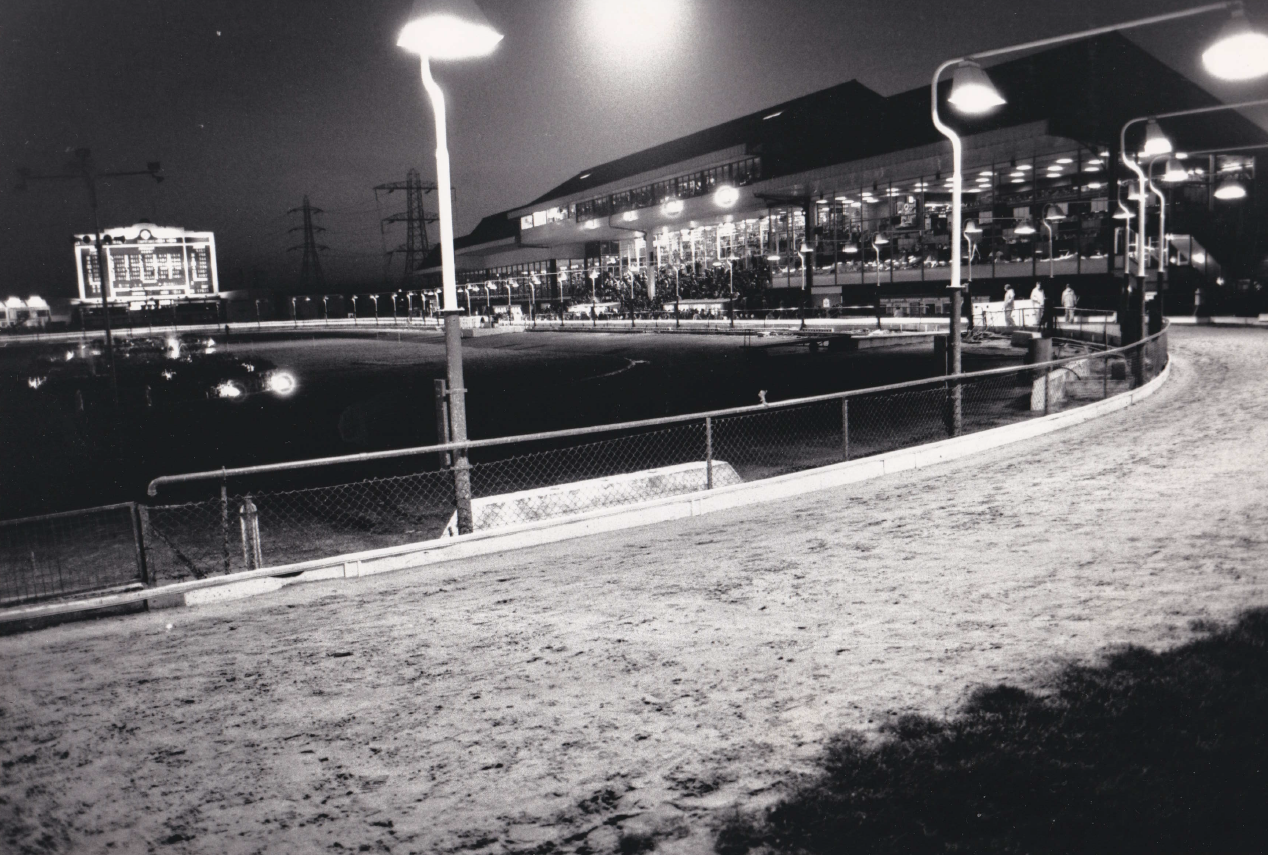
Walthamstow Greyhound Stadium c.1970

In 1971 a new stand with a restaurant and an escalator were added. Charles Chandler (1976) and his brother Victor Chandler (1977) both died, bringing uncertainty as to the future of the company. Charles Chandler Jr. was made the new chairman and Percy Chandler the new managing director. Victor Chandler Jr. inherited a 20% stake but sold his share concentrating on the bookmaking business. The Greyhound Racing Association held a third share in the track but had to sell to alleviate their debts. Suddenly it became apparent that an interested party could acquire a 52% stake and have the controlling interest. Coral and Ladbrokes expressed an interest but Charles Jr., Percy and Frances Chandler spent over £400,000 to withstand the takeover attempts and buy the track outright.

=== 1980s ===
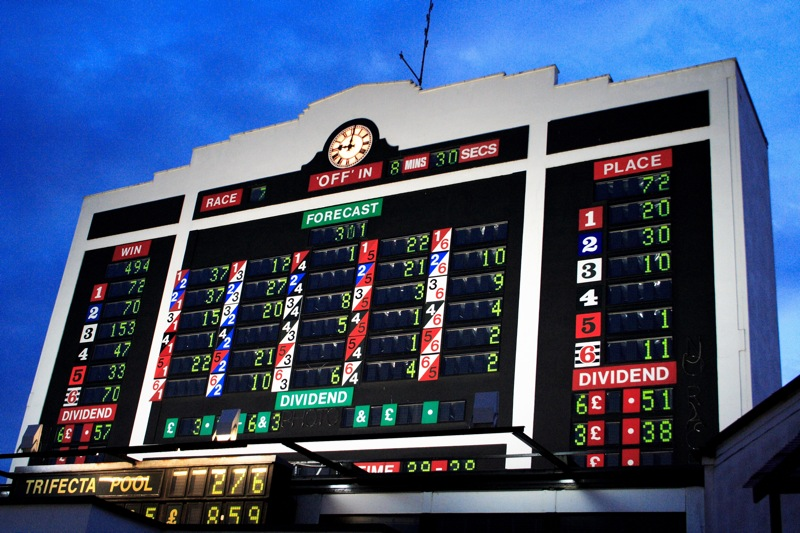
Walthamstow Stadium scoreboard

Racing Manager (RM) Ray Spalding left to be replaced by Tony Smith in 1983 with Chris Page as assistant RM. A new generation of trainer included Jim Sherry, Dick Hawkes and Kenny Linzell. Also in 1984 a nightclub called Charlie Chan's was opened within the foundations of the clocktower. It closed permanently in November 2007. In 1986, one of the leading trainers in the country had just joined Oxford Stadium but switched to Walthamstow after receiving a late job offer. Less than a year later Baggs trained Signal Spark to the 1987 English Greyhound Derby crown, remarkably the first time the track had achieved the accolade.

A fourth major event was introduced in 1987, called the Arc. After Barney O'Connor died in 1988 further trainer appointments included Ernie Gaskin Sr. in 1988 and John Coleman in 1989. Walthamstow became the leading track in Britain and in 1988 tote turnover figures were £16,355,089.

=== 1990s ===
Chris Page became Racing Manager and a second Derby triumph arrived when Slippy Blue won the 1990 event. Page recruited Linda Mullins who went on to win five Greyhound Trainer of the Year awards. The track earned their first Bookmakers Afternoon Greyhound Service contract and John Coleman won the trainers championship. Another leading trainer called Paul Young arrived during 1996. In 1998 the Racing Post sponsored the Racing Post Festival at the track. Trainer Linda Jones was appointed in 1999, and would be Greyhound Trainer of the Year twice.

=== Final years ===
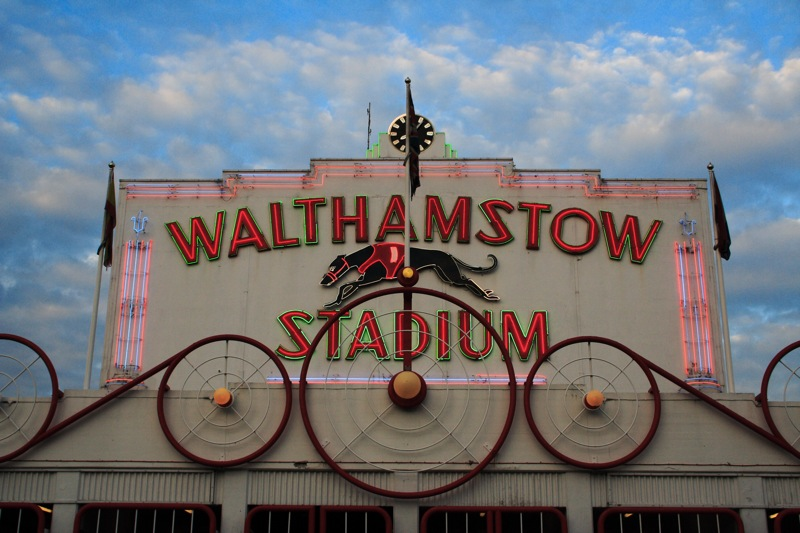
The front facade in 2006

Linda Mullins retired with the trainers going to her son John, Ernie Gaskin Sr. retired in 2005 with the kennels being taken over by his son Ernest Gaskin Jr. and Mark Wallis took over from Linda Jones. Despite the success the directors agreed to the sale of the company's freehold property to a development consortium led by Yoo Capital and K W Linfoot plc. Formal contracts were exchanged. The final race was held on Saturday 16 August at 11pm, the winner being trap two 'Mountjoy Diamond'.

== Speedway ==
Motor cycle speedway racing was staged at the Walthamstow Greyhound Stadium in Chingford Road in 1934 and between 1949 and 1951. Between 1949 and 1951 the team, known as the Walthamstow Wolves, raced in the National League Second Division with moderate success. The team included ex-England international George Newton. At that time all the other London clubs, Wembley, Wimbledon, West Ham, Harringay and New Cross raced in the First Division. The sport left the stadium in the 1950s owing to declining attendance and complaints of noise from local residents. The track was covered in tarmac for easier maintenance of the dog track.

== Stock car racing ==
Stock car racing took place at many greyhound and speedway tracks. Between 1962 and 1968 Walthamstow Stadium was home to BriSCA "Senior" F1 and "Junior" F2 stock cars.

On 29 March 1968 the Spedeworth promotion took over the running of racing at Walthamstow with their Superstox, Stock Car, Hot Rod, Banger and Midget Racing. The promotion continued there until the end of the 1974 racing season.

== Decline and closure ==
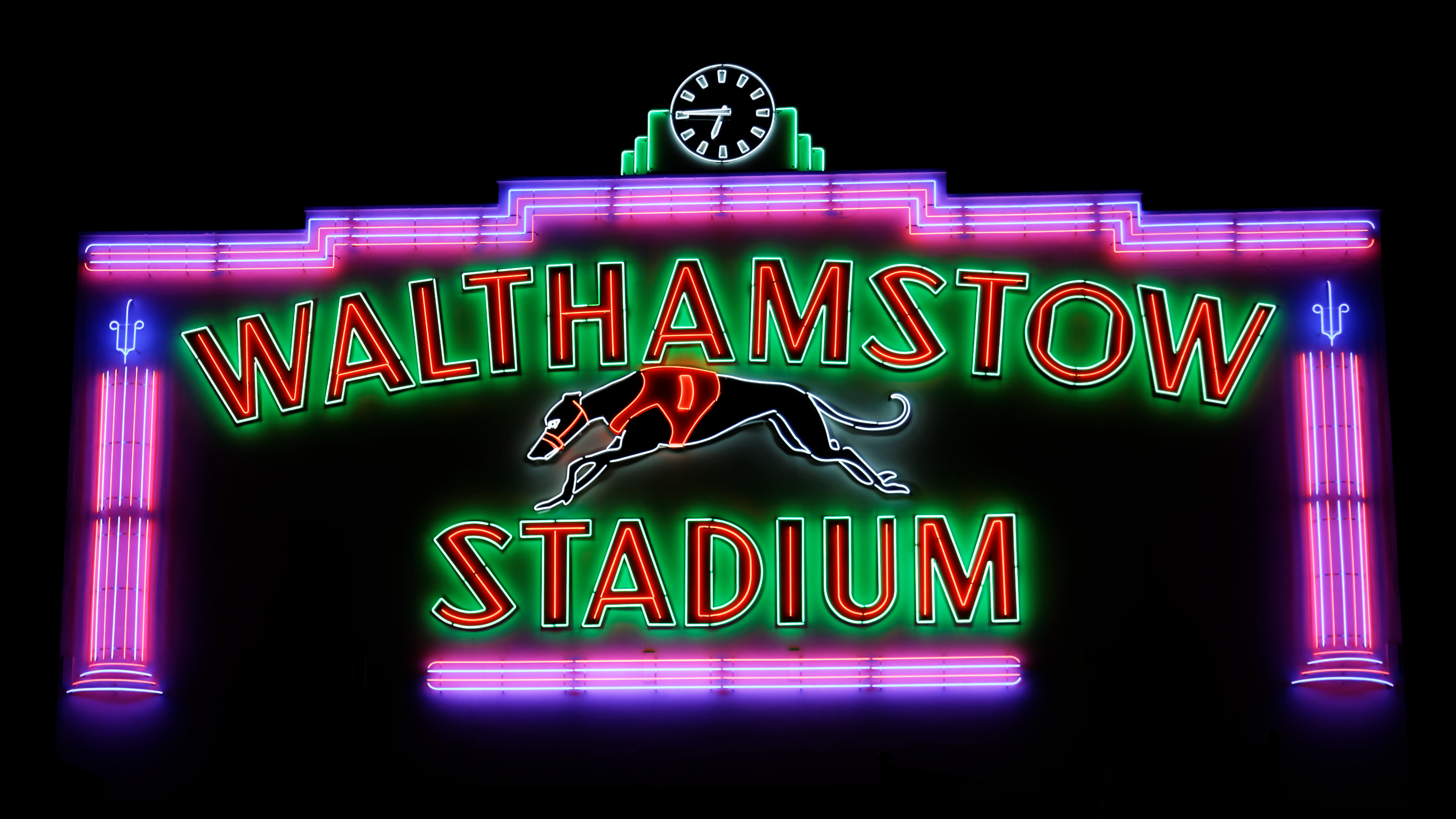
Walthamstow Stadium front range neon lighting after full restoration in 2016

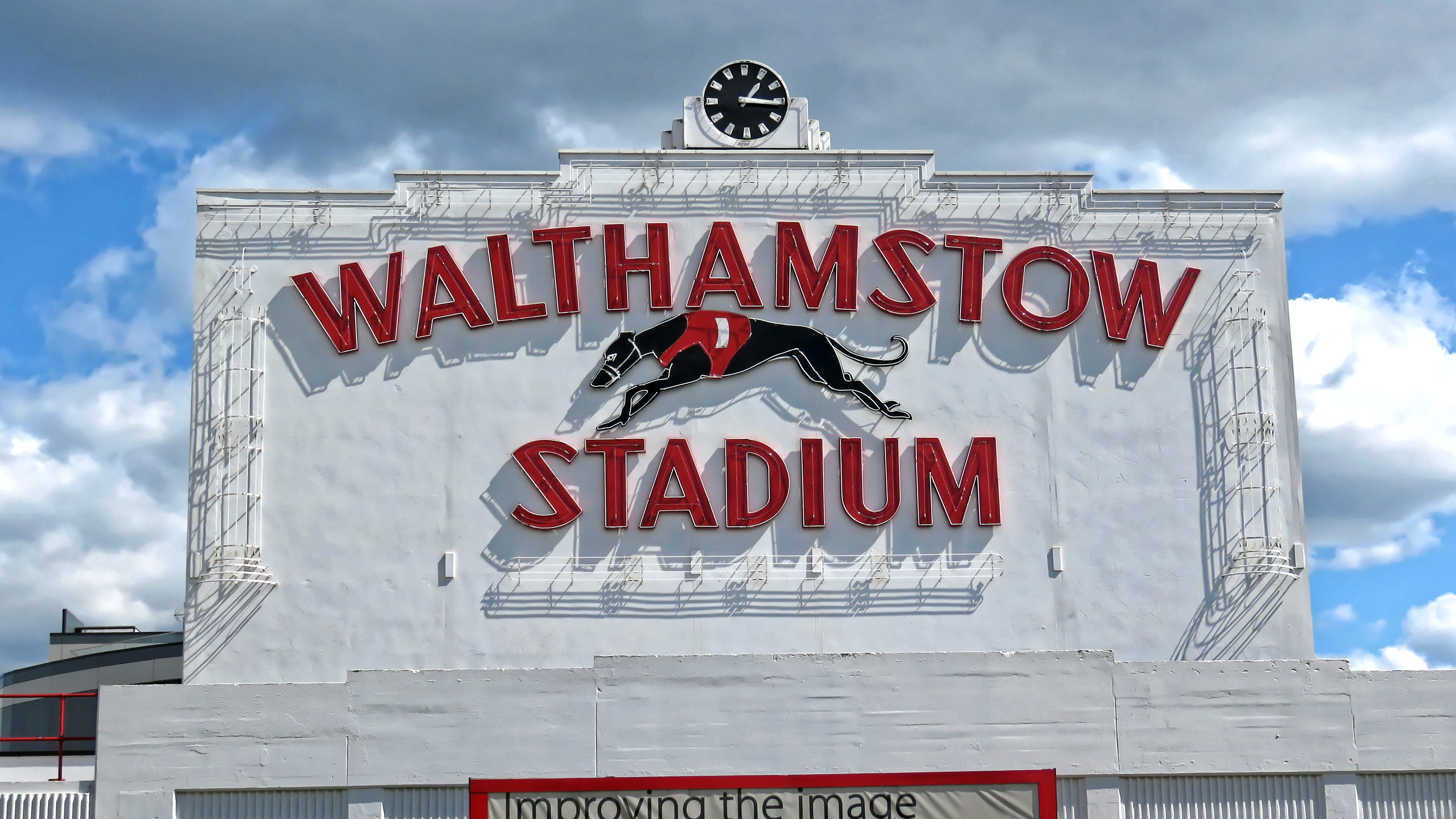
Walthamstow Stadium front range in daylight (2017)

It could be said that if a person from the East End of London refers to "going down the dogs", they were probably going to the dog track at Walthamstow or Romford Greyhound Stadium. There were once 33 greyhound tracks in London, but at the time of Walthamstow's closing only Crayford (closed 2025), Romford, and Wimbledon (closed 2017) remained.

The directors of Walthamstow Stadium Limited agreed to the sale of the company's freehold property at Walthamstow Stadium to a development consortium led by London and Quadrant. They claimed falling profits and attendances forced the sale. Formal contracts were exchanged and completed in 2008. The final race was held on Saturday 16 August 2008, the winner being 'Mountjoy Diamond'. Numerous unsuccessful attempts to buy or lease the stadium back from developers were subsequently made.

On 8 May 2012, the application for housing on the site was approved by four votes to three. On 30 October 2012, Mayor of London Boris Johnson approved the plans for housing. The stadium buildings were demolished and were replaced with 292 new homes, but the Grade II-listed front facade remains, as does an outbuilding of kennels which is also Grade II listed.

In February 2016, the 1930s neon lights were turned on for the first time since the stadium's closure in 2008, following a £100,000 restoration.

== Television ==
The stadium appears as one of the location settings for an episode of the television New Tricks. Titled Eyes Down for a Full House, the episode centred around the story of a missing greyhound and a possible murder. It was broadcast by the BBC on 5 June 2005 as the sixth episode in the second season of the show. It also appears in one episode of the 1986 BBC TV series " Just another day " narrated by John Pitman.

== Competitions ==
=== The Circuit ===
Extended content

Year	Winner	Breeding	Trainer	Time	SP	Notes
1944	Ballyhennessy Seal	Lone Seal – Canadian Glory	Stan Martin (Wimbledon)	28.59	4-11f	Track record
1945	Rushton Ranger		Harry Spoor (New Cross)	29.38	100-7	
1946	Gullane Idol		Stanley Biss (Clapton)	28.94	11-8f	
1947	Trev's Perfection	Trev's Despatch-Friar Tuck	Fred Trevillion (Private)	28.80	5-2	
1948	Funny Mick	Ruby Border – Olives Idol	Bob Burls (Wembley)	28.68	9-4	
1949	Black Coffee		E Harding (Charlton)	29.05	7-2	
1950	Kismet D		Fred Trevillion (Private)	28.95	4-1	
1956	Grand Reject		Bill Fear (Walthamstow)	28.48	10-11f	
1957	Local Swallow	Galtee Cleo – Put Your Shoes on Lucy	Tom Paddy Reilly (Walthamstow)	28.56	5-1	
1958	Kilcaskin Kern	Magourna Reject - Pavona	Tony Dennis (Private)	28.38	8-13f	
1959	Town King	Small Town – Orphan Princess	Leslie Reynolds (Wembley)	28.28	6-4f	
1960	Dunstown Paddy	Champion Prince – Geffs Linnett	Tom Paddy Reilly (Walthamstow)	28.57	4-6f	
1962	Geddys Queenie	Fourth of July – Selected Miss	Dave Geggus (Walthamstow)	28.03		
1963	Westpark	Hi There - Faoide	Tom Paddy Reilly (Walthamstow)	27.60		
1966	Peculiar Way		George Curtis (Portsmouth)			
1971	Cobbler	Monalee Champion – Yurituni	Dave Geggus (Walthamstow)	29.11	4-7f	
1972	Say Little	Albany – Newhouse Blue	Colin McNally (Perry Barr)	28.85	4-5f	
1973	Kenneallys Moor	Moordyke Spot – Kenneallys Tune	Clare Orton (Wimbledon)	29.40	5-1	
1974	Leaders Champion	Monalee Champion – Little Leader	Dave Geggus (Walthamstow)	29.05	3-1	
1975	Falban	Move Gas – Monlena Dolly	Charlie Coyle (Private)	29.36	1-1f	
1976	Knocktoo Bill	Kilbelin Style – She Is Landing	Dave Geggus (Walthamstow)	29.09	11-8f	
1977	Huberts Consort	Mortor Light – Harmony Link	Tom Paddy Reilly (Walthamstow)	29.17	8-11f	
1978	Pigeon Flyer	Mel's Pupil – Majorca Yank	Tom Reilly (Walthamstow)	29.14	6-1	
1979	It's Stylish	Kilbelin Style – Ashfield Lady	John Sherry (Walthamstow)	29.10	4-1	
1980	Lift Coming	Sunvalley Star – Brilliant Mind	Dick Hawkes (Walthamstow)	28.82	4-5f	
1981	Deel Joker	Free Speech – Leaping Lady	John Gibbons (Crayford)	28.75	4-11f	
1982	Rikasso Hiker	Glenore Hiker – Lady Myrtown	Theo Mentzis (Milton Keynes)	28.95	3-1	
1983	Raceway Mick	Ballintee Star – Tullamaine Moon	Adam Jackson (Wembley)	28.90	1-1f	
1984	Kylemore Champ	Lindas Champion – Airglooney Lass	Terry Duggan (Romford)	29.02	9-4f	
1985	Ballintubber One	Killaclug Jet – Ballintubber Peg	Kenny Linzell (Walthamstow)	29.13	7-2	
1986	Hot Sauce Yankee	Sand Man – Westpark Goldie	Derek Knight (Brighton)	28.76	4-6f	
1987	Flashy Sir	Sand Man – Cherry Express	Nick Savva (Milton Keynes)	28.80	7-2	
1988	Round the Bend	Glatton Grange – Three Point Turn		28.78		
1989	Yes Speedy	Curryhills Fox - Yes Mam	John McGee Sr. (Private)	28.69		
1990	Make Magic	Manorville Sand – Roses Spots	Ernie Gaskin Sr. (Private)	28.53	11-10f	
1991	Ridgedale Gold	Daleys Gold – Nalced Beauty	Paul Garland (Oxford)	28.85	5-2	
1992	Barbarian Prince	Moral Support – Barbary Doll	Mick Douglass (Rye House)	28.85	7-1	
1993	Lyons Double	Castlelyons Gem – Lyons Lady	Donna Pickett (Canterbury)	29.30	4-1	
1994	Connells Cross	Adraville Bridge – Ballydrisheen	Ernie Gaskin Sr. (Walthamstow)	28.55	7-1	
1995	Countrywide Fox	Greenpark Fox – Quare Wish	John Coleman (Walthamstow)	29.00	4-5f	
1996	Forward Venture	Slaneyside Hare – Rose Venture	Chris Duggan (Walthamstow)	28.70	11-4	
1997	Velvet Tom	Summerhill Gift – Velvet Coat	David Firmager (Private)	28.86	5-2f	
1998	Knockrour Casper	Moaning Lad – Why Stella	Ernie Gaskin Sr. (Walthamstow)	28.94	7-1	
1999	Ceekay	Cry Dalcash – Supa Plan	Linda Mullins (Walthamstow)	28.90	5-2	
2000	Mumble Swerve	Druids Wally - Rhincrew Diane	Linda Jones (Walthamstow)	28.68	8-1	
2001	Blue Gooner	Staplers Jo – Code Dancer	John Mullins (Walthamstow)	28.77	5-4f	
2002	Palacemews Lad	Roanokee – Lisnak Slippy	John Mullins (Walthamstow)	29.02	5-2	
2003	Lozzas Dream	He Knows – Jumbos Moth	Derek Knight (Hove)	29.00	5-4f	
2004	Margan Bluebell	Concorde Direct – Tobys Girl	Linda Jones (Walthamstow)	28.97	7-4	
2005	Kindred Rebel	Top Honcho – Cleanaway Sheila	Mick Puzey (Walthamstow)	28.67	7-1	
2006	Cobra Striking	Brett Lee – Miss Tetley	Ernest Gaskin Jr. (Private)	28.92	6-4f	
2007	Jazz Hurricane	Top Honcho – Lucy May	Derek Knight (Hove)	28.69	1-1f	

1944-1974 (525 yards), 1951-1955 (not held), 1975-2007 (475m)

== Track records ==
=== Pre Metric records ===
Extended content

Distance (yards)	Greyhound	Time	Date	Notes
500	Ballyhennessy Seal		28.59 1944	Circuit Final
500	Shaggy Lass	28.55	13.12.1945	
525	Ballynennan Moon	29.79	21.11.1942	
525	Ballyoulster Deemster	29.76	10.1951	Grand Prix heats
525	Rushton Smutty	29.74	10.1951	Grand Prix heats
525	Olivers Lad	29.73	10.1951	Grand Prix second round
525	Rushton Smutty	29.70	10.1951	Grand Prix semi-finals
525	Duet Leader	29.24	1956	
525	Drina	28.99	23.01.1962	
525	Some Cheatha	28.95	09.1968	
525	Say Little	28.83	1972	
700	Stylish Nancy	40.92	29.11.1945	
700	Kilbelin Dancer	40.81	1948	
700	The Fixer	40.09	04.08.1962	
700	Switch Hitter	40.05	08.1968	
700	Hong Kong Bay	39.91	09.1968	
700	Cash For Dan	39.88	1970	
700	Breachs Buzzard	39.78	1971	
880	Bedford		16.04.1966	
880	Hiver Whitenose	52.54	1968	
880	Hiver Whitenose	52.13	1968	
880	Todos Liza	51.58	07.10.1968	Test heats
525 H	Frating Dan	31.01	10.04.1943	
525 H	Baytown Blackbird	30.52	1946	
525 H	Lisnalong Hero	30.06	01.05.1965	
700 H	Dogstown Queen	41.33	28.08.1965	

=== Post Metric records ===
Extended content

Distance (metres)	Greyhound	Time	Date	Notes
235	Barbaran	14.23	16.04.1983	
235	Often Hungry	14.23	12.11.1987	
235	Ard Boxer	14.23	12.03.1988	
235	Farncombe Black	14.16	25.08.1988	
235	Horseshoe Ping	14.14	16.09.2006	
235	Horseshoe Ping	14.14	17.11.2007	
415	Roseville Fergie	25.06	18.08.1987	
415	Close Enough	25.03	19.06.1990	
415	Roslo Speedy	24.99	09.07.1994	
415	Kilmacsimon Wave	24.88	14.09.1995	
430	Thank You Madam	25.71	20.08.2005	
430	Milldean Flash	25.70	16.08.2008	
435	Glover Hill Boy	25.97	01.08.1996	
435	Union Decree	25.71	19.11.1998	
475	Blissful Hero	28.72	1978	
475	Deel Joker	28.54	18.07.1981	Circuit heats
475	Foretop	28.45	09.07.1988	
475	Connells Cross	28.55	09.07.1994	
475	Star of Tyrone	28.49	19.03.1995	
475	Westmead Chick	28.49	11.06.1995	
475	Pennys Worth	28.42	19.02.2005	The Arc second round
475	Jazz Hurricane	28.42	20.01.2007	
475	Barnfield On Air	28.15	04.09.2007	
640	Paradise Spectre	39.50	10.1977	
640	Ballyregan Bob	39.40	28.05.1985	Test heats
640	Westmead Move	39.35	11.10.1986	
640	Westmead Call	39.30	06.08.1987	
640	Waltham Abbey	39.18	03.08.1989	
640	Silver Glow	39.41	31.05.1994	
640	Spring Rose	39.05	05.10.1996	Grand Prix Final
640	Palace Issue	39.00	23.11.1999	
640	Never Can Tell	39.47	30.04.2005	
640	Star of Dromin	39.43	16.06.2005	
640	Star of Dromin	39.24	09.07.2005	
640	Fear Robben	39.21	16.09.2006	
640	Spiridon Louis	39.19	07.08.2008	
640	Butterbridge Ali	39.16	16.08.2008	
820	Todos Liza	51.58	1981	
820	Sail On Valerie	51.24	1989	
820	Clonbrin Basket	51.21	19.07.1990	
820	Smart Decision	51.59	09.07.1994	
820	Long Island Jim	51.50	02.11.1995	
835	Star of Dromin	52.65	20.08.2005	
835	Star of Dromin	52.46	06.04.2006	
835	Bubbly Kate	52.19	04.09.2007	
840	Handy Score	52.95	15.02.1997	
840	Redwood Sara	52.12	07.08.1997	
880	Yankees Shadow	55.99	11.10.1986	
880	Lilac Wonder	55.62	01.08.1991	
880	Clonbrin Basket	55.30	12.10.1991	
880	Decoy Lnyx	55.65	08.10.1994	
880	Star of Dromin	55.78	15.10.2005	
880	Ebony Ocean	55.53	04.09.2007	
1045	Silver Mask	67.37	09.06.1987	
1045	Wheres Dunait	68.61	05.30.1994	
1045	Smart Decision	68.00	12.08.1995	
1045	Handy Score	67.90	19.11.1998	
1045	Betathan Pebbles	67.50	15.10.2005	
475 H	Thanet Queen	28.89	30.07.1981	
475 H	Never A Smile	29.79	23.02.1991	
475 H	Herbie Lambug	29.70	13.04.1991	
475 H	Unbelievable	29.37	17.04.1991	
475 H	Deerpark Jim	29.12	13.07.1991	
475 H	Heavenly Dream	28.96	19.05.1994	
475 H	Glown Fox	28.92	06.06.1997	
475 H	Blue Meadow Lad	28.75	30.05.2005	
640 H	Fotospur Champ	40.18	12.10.1991	
640 H	Freewheel Kylo	40.49	08.10.1994	
640 H	Heros Morsel	40.44	08.03.1997	
640 H	El Tenor	40.39	09.03.1999	
640 H	Fallowfield	40.61	02.04.2005	
640 H	Killeen Tom	40.31	30.04.2005	
640 H	Sizzlers Bossman	40.27	09.06.2005	
640 H	Sizzlers Bossman	39.78	09.07.2005	

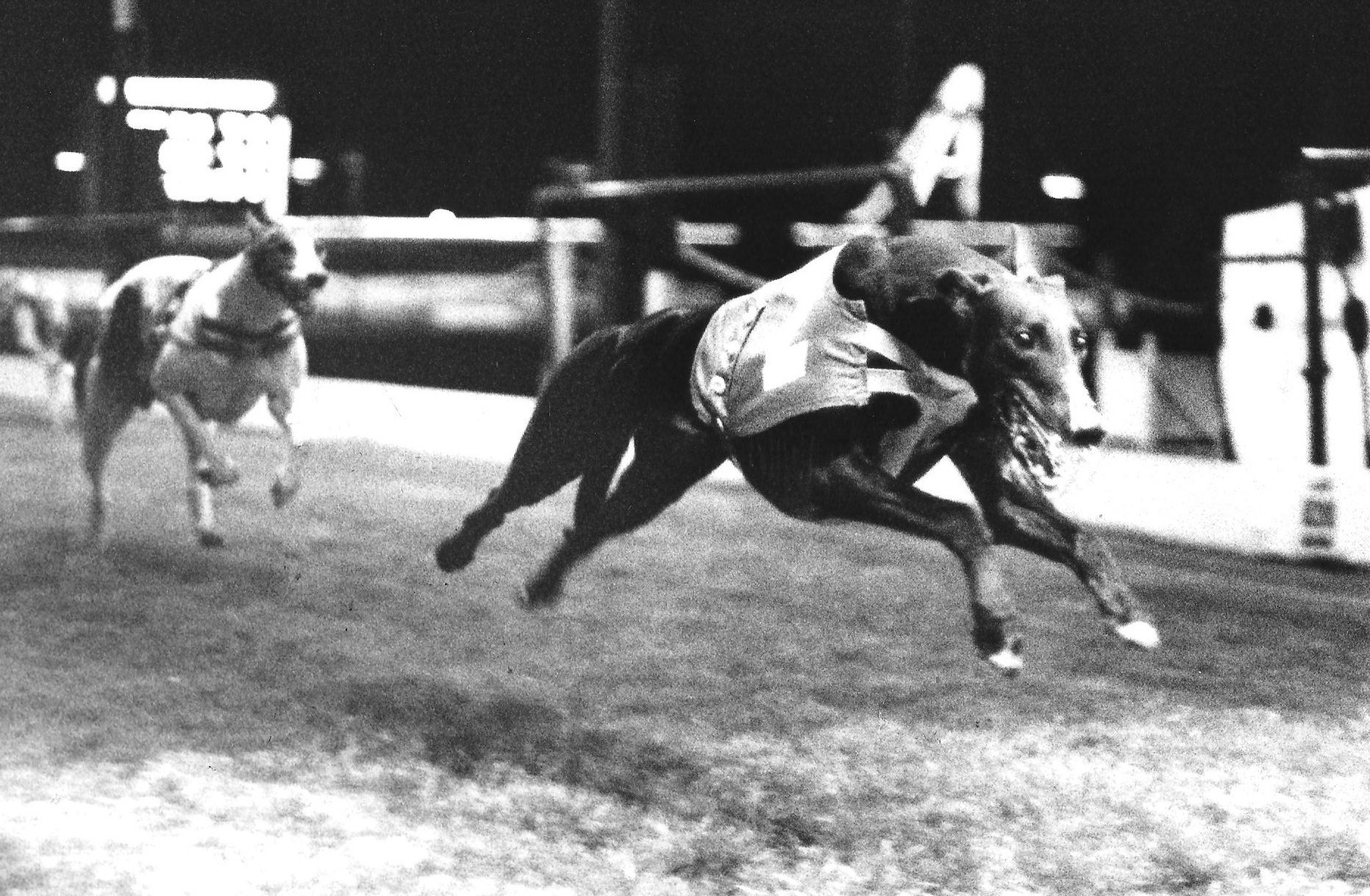
1989 Waltham Abbey breaks the 640 metres track record at Walthamstow during the Grand Prix
