= Portsmouth Stadium =

Greyhound racing stadium

Portsmouth Greyhound Stadium
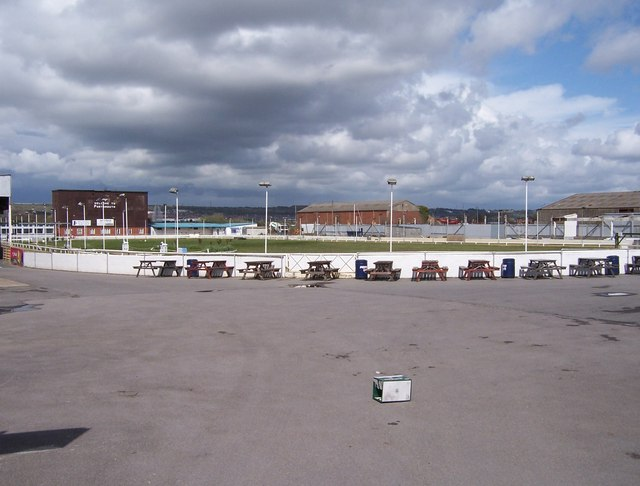
- a view of the stadium in 2008
- Interactive map of Portsmouth Greyhound Stadium
- Location: Tipner, north west Portsmouth
- Coordinates: 50°49′27″N 1°05′16″W

Construction
- Opened: 1931
- Closed: 2010

Portsmouth Greyhound Stadium was a greyhound racing stadium in Tipner north west of Portsmouth, England.

== Origins ==
The stadium was constructed in 1930 east of Tipner Lane on the site of the Stamshaw Chemical Works. The stadium would be accessed from the new Target Road and effectively replaced the track at Portsmouth Greyhound Track (Copnor), which raced from 1928 to 1930.

== Opening ==
The new, larger stadium was opened on 25 May 1931, with trainer Fred Tolfree claiming all the first four places in a five-dog opening race. The first winner was Tommy's Pup, the 2–1 favourite.

== Pre war history ==
In 1932 the stadium was bought by Joe Childs, a famous jockey at the time because he was jockey to the King George V. Also included in the new management team were Jack Parker, captain of the Harringay speedway team, and Bradbury Pratt.

In 1937 a 14-year-old boy called George Curtis secured a job with track trainer Bill Peters and one year later Hugo Spencer joined the track as a trainer. The management of the stadium was run by Sporting Promotions (Portsmouth) Ltd.

== Postwar history ==
The totalisator turnover peaked in 1946 at £1,108,662.

The stadium saw a limited run of stock car racing from 23 April 1955 to September the same year. The initial meetings were promoted by JG Southouse, with one of the drivers, Dan Spence, recorded in the same role from July.

In 1956 Quick Surprise won the Scottish Greyhound Derby and reached the final of the English Greyhound Derby for trainer Pat Mullins. Two years later Joe Childs died and the ownership of the stadium went into the hands of F A Childs who also became racing manager. F A Childs was replaced by E F G Wilkins after Childs drowned in an accident. Childs was remembered in the following years with the running of the F.A.Childs Memorial Trophy.

In 1961 the Hugo Spencer-trained Hey There Merry won the Scottish Derby, and Spencer's Trip To Dublin reached the English Derby final. The Nationwide Leisure Company took over the stadium in 1963, with Bill Francis becoming racing manager, and the Golden Muzzle would be introduced as the track's premier event.

George Curtis claimed his first win as a trainer when Bad Trick won the 1964 Puppy Derby. In 1968 Curtis left Portsmouth for Brighton, replaced by his brother Charlie and leaving Hugo Spencer and Greg Doyle as the other resident trainers. Charlie Curtis was killed in a car crash just one year later.

Spencer continued his success by winning the 1971 Welsh Greyhound Derby with Spectres Dream and he would also win three National Sprints in 1961 with Hi There Merry and two in 1975 and 1976. The race itself would be transferred to Portsmouth for three years after the closure of Clapton Stadium.

In 1972 the Greyhound Racing Association (GRA) bought the track from the Nationwide Leisure Company for the sole purpose of selling it as a lucrative commercial property under there GRA Property Trust Company. However the property bubble burst in 1973 leaving the south coast venue with a lifeline. Reading had not been so lucky and closed under the GRA which resulted in trainer Ron Jeffrey arriving at Portsmouth. Bill Francis became General Manager and oversaw two Racing Managers spells, Jim Layton and Stuart Strachan both filled the position before Dave Stow settled in the role.

Walstone reached the 1985 English Greyhound Derby final for trainer John Copplestone and in 1990 the track replaced the grass straights to go to all sand. The same year Jo Burridge won the Hunt Cup with Coloured Panther. Copplestone had another English Derby finalist in 1991 when Summerhill Super finished fifth and another Copplestone greyhound called Murlens Abbey won the Greyhound of the Year after wins that included the Arc, East Anglian Derby and Edinburgh Cup.

In 1992 Wembley plc announced significant losses leading to cost-cutting exercises and Portsmouth suffered as a result despite the fact that the GRA had pledged a new state-of-the-art Portsmouth stadium previously. Lee McAlpine replaced Dave Stow as racing manager before Eric Graham took over and in 1998 Jim Snowden left Catford Stadium to take over as general manager from the retiring Bill Francis.

During 2006 the track's 'Inside Sumner' hare system was replaced by the 'Swaffham'

== Closure ==
In 2008, it was announced that Portsmouth City Council's long-term lease was nearing its end, and they were considering selling the site for redevelopment. Lease holders GRA offloaded the track to a new company, registered in March 2008, called PGS Ltd headed by general manager Eric Graham.

It was agreed that PGS Ltd could pay the council a peppercorn rent of £1,000 per year because there was no value in redeveloping the land at that time. Graham attempted to renew the lease two years later in 2010, but it was rejected by the Tipner Regeneration Company and South East England Development Agency. Within weeks the company was wound up with immediate effect, and liquidators were appointed, with staff and trainers left unpaid. Racing manager Paul Clark was suspended by Graham for comments made over the GRA's and Grahams role in the closure.

The last meeting took place on 27 March 2010, and the stadium was demolished in 2012, with the site awaiting redevelopment.

== Track records ==
Pre-metric

Distance yards	Greyhound	Time	Date	Notes
470	Clam	27.30	1950	
470	Hey There Merry	26.68	24.05.1963	
655	Shaggy Lass	38.34	1946	
655	Laurdella Guest	37.67	06.06.1964	
850	Woodville Fortune	50.54	03.07.1964	
470 H	Tuathal Teachtmar	28.29	1950	

Post-metric

Distance metres	Greyhound	Time	Date	Notes
246	Gold Tip	15.04	17.03.2009	
256	Mr Belvedere	15.72	26.06.1987	
256	Lissadell Tiger	15.55	09.06.1989	
430	Ivory Dave	26.30	08.04.2006	
430	Coolside Lucky	26.27	20.10.2006	Golden Muzzle heats
438	Northwood Double	26.95	1977	
438	Blakes World	26.15	29.10.2006	Golden Muzzle final
438	Skelligs Tiger	26.63	19.07.1985	
438	Beaver Dip	26.37	16.09.1988	
438	Knockeevan Magic	26.26	05.10.2003	Golden Muzzle final
601	Bills Paid	37.51	02.06.2006	
610	Wellington Sand	38.32	16.10.1984	
610	Crohane Lucy	38.26	06.10.1989	
610	Firmount Flapjack	38.14	13.10.2000	
784	Active Pearl	50.43	04.08.2006	
792	Airmount Sand	50.65	16.10.1984	
792	My Texette	50.62	28.07.1993	
792	Winetavern Sooth	50.60	28.07.2000	
955	Zuzu's Petal	62.18	02.06.2006	
964	Wheres Dunait	62.94	28.07.1993	
