= Ernie Gaskin =

English professional greyhound trainer (1933–2020)

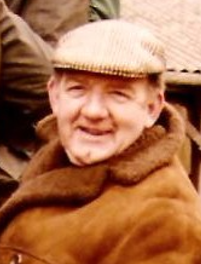

Personal information
- Born: Q2, 1933 Edmonton, London
- Died: 24 February 2020 (aged 86)
- Occupation: Greyhound trainer

Sport
- Sport: Greyhound racing

Achievements and titles
- National finals: Classic/Feature wins: Laurels (1985, 1988); Cesarewitch (1981, 1984); Grand Prix (1989, 1993, 1994); Oaks (1980, 1991, 1995, 1997); Scurry Gold Cup (1988); Grand National (1995); Trainers Championship (1988, 1996, 1998)

Ernie Gaskin Sr. (1933–2020) was an English greyhound trainer. He was three times winner of the Trainers Championship and won 12 classic races.

== Career ==
In 1961 Ernie Gaskin's Clopook ran in the English Derby final just two months after being granted a trainers licence. He relinquished his licence in 1963 after Horney Council objected to his kennels and he sold his greyhounds at Aldridges sales.

In 1977 he established new kennels in Nazeing, Essex. Gaskin bred many of his own greyhounds including Devilish Dolores that won the 1980 Oaks and was also the breeder of the 1971 English Greyhound Derby champion Dolores Rocket.

Further classic wins were achieved by Kinda Friendly, Mobile Bank and Ballygroman Jim before he won his first Trainers Championship in 1988, the same year that he had two Derby finalists with Curryhills Gara and Comeragh Boy.

His prominence continued with the likes of stayers Waltham Abbey and Redwood Girl and he joined Walthamstow Stadium as a contracted trainer in 1991.

== Retirement ==
He retired and handed the kennels to his son Ernest Gaskin Jr. on 30 June 2005. Gaskin died on 24 February 2020.

== Awards ==
He was three times winner of the Trainers Championship in 1988, 1996 and 1998.
