= 1973 UK & Ireland Greyhound Racing Year =

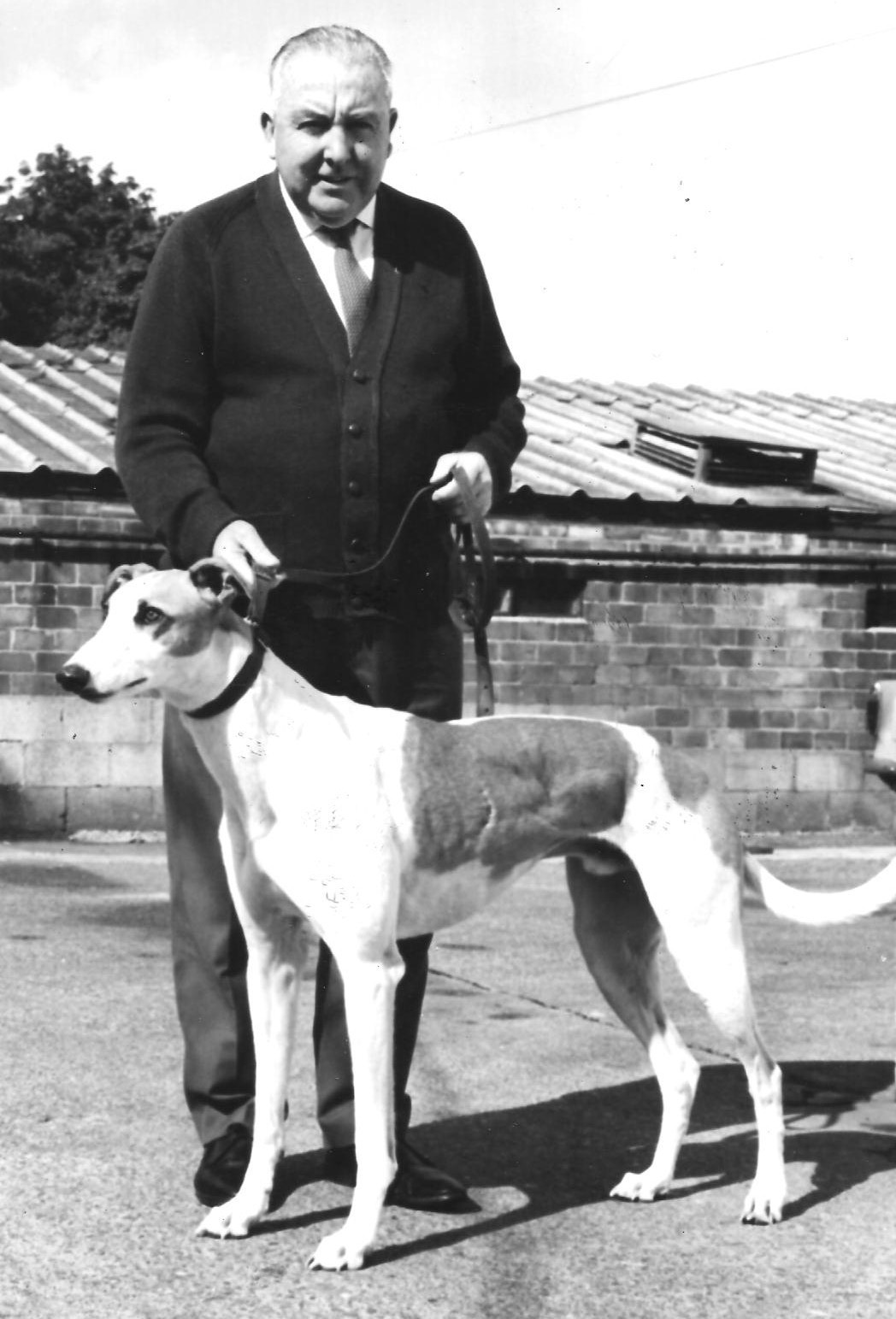
- St Leger and Cesarewitch finalist Todos Ozzie

The 1973 UK & Ireland Greyhound Racing Year was the 48th year of greyhound racing in the United Kingdom and the 47th year of greyhound racing in Ireland.

== Roll of honour ==
Major Winners
Award	Name of Winner
1973 English Greyhound Derby	Patricias Hope
1973 Irish Greyhound Derby	Bashful Man
1973 Scottish Greyhound Derby	Dashalong Chief
1973 Welsh Greyhound Derby	Silly Rocket
Greyhound Trainer of the Year	Norman Oliver
Greyhound of the Year	Case Money
Irish Greyhound of the Year	Romping To Work

== Summary ==
The annual National Greyhound Racing Club (NGRC) returns were released, with totalisator turnover at £58,495,322 and attendances recorded at 6,101,704 from 5458 meetings.

The 1972 Greyhound of the Year, Patricias Hope sealed a second English Greyhound Derby triumph. He became only the second greyhound in history, after Mick the Miller to claim a second title. The event was broadcast live on ITV's World of Sport and he won £12,500, under new sponsors Spillers. John O'Connor had bought a share in the greyhound and trained him for the 1973 competition. He was later retired and returned to stud duties.

== Tracks ==
Two more Greyhound Racing Association stadia closed under their Property Trust, White City Stadium (Liverpool) which had only been purchased by them in 1972, closed on 6 October 1973 and Reading closed on 10 November. Portsmouth gained a reprieve because the GRA property bubble burst and greyhound racing became the only viable option again. The property boom would soon turn into a slump.

Bobby Jack Enterprises purchased independent track Mount Vernon Sports Stadium, in Glasgow and invested heavily to update the facility.

== News ==
The Wembley kennels were demolished leaving some of the sport's most famous trainers without a base. Jack Harvey, Bob Burls and Jack Kinsley were all forced into early retirement. Jimmy Jowett and Sid Mann, two other major training names also retired. Jowett was probably unsettled by the threat of closure hanging over Clapton and Mann, GRA's longest serving trainer had earned a full trainers licence back in 1930 at Hall Green. Gloucester stadium trainer Leslie Carpenter died aged 79, he had trained for over 40 years.

Jack Tetlow, the Wembley Racing Manager also retired after 40 year's service and Leicester Racing Manager George McKay died after a life in greyhound racing. Bob Rowe became the White City Racing Manager taking over from Charlie Birch.

Trainers Stan Gudgin and Ron Jeffrey moved to Slough and Portsmouth respectively following the closure of Reading. The NGRC announced plans to revamp licences, the current licences were private racecourse or dispersed full licence, owner trainer licence and C-licence, this was done in the hope that many of the 62 independent tracks would join the NGRC banner and 46 NGRC tracks at the time.

The last McWhirter drag hare in use (at Oxford) was switched to an Outside Sumner, and a new world and national record for 525 yards was set at Brighton by Easy Investment who recorded 28.17. The end of year annual Duke of Edinburgh Cup was won by Wembley after a final victory of 64 to 56 over Hall Green and White City was used for a film called Steptoe and Son Ride Again.

== Ireland ==
The government legalised tote betting in Northern Ireland, a decision that came 45 years too late for Celtic Park (Belfast) who had started racing in 1927. The Irish Greyhound Derby sponsors PJ Carroll Ltd offered a single race prize of £1,200 for Dundalk International and doubled the Derby winner's prize to £10,000, which was won by Bashful Man.

Larry Kelly's Romping To Work was voted Irish Greyhound of the Year after winning both the Oaks and St Leger.

== Competitions ==
Patricias Hope stole all of the headlines but St Leger champion Ramdeen Stuart started his 1973 campaign by winning the Gold Collar at Catford Stadium. Case Money, a black dog trained by Ted Parker was voted Greyhound of the Year, he had won the 1973 St Leger and the Ben Truman Stakes, in addition to the Shelbourne 600 before arriving in the UK. This was a slightly strange decision based on the fact that Patricias Hope had emulated the achievement of Mick the Miller.

== Principal UK races ==
Grand National, White City (April 19 525y h, £600)
Pos	Name of Greyhound	Trainer	SP	Time	Trap
1st	Killone Flash	Randy Singleton	5-2	29.35	2
2nd	Bingo Basher	Noreen Collin	33-1	29.83	4
3rd	Rest		11-2	30.09	6
4th	Samnic Blue	Noreen Collin	5-1	30.13	5
5th	Graceful Fellow	Peter Payne	6-4f	30.25	3
6th	Orwell Reject	Mrs.Dorin Clark	8-1	30.29	1

BBC TV Trophy, Wimbledon (Apr 18, 880y, £1,000)
Pos	Name of Greyhound	Trainer	SP	Time	Trap
1st	Leading Pride	George Curtis	51.16	2-1f	3
2nd	Yellow Escort	Norman Oliver	51.24	10-1	6
3rd	Westpark Dainty	Freddie Warrell	51.32	5-1	1
4th	Balliniska Gun	Arthur Hancock	51.34	9-2	2
5th	Albany Ranger	Eddie Moore	51.50	9-1	5
6th	Westmead Pride	Arnold Mobley	51.53	11-4	4

Gold Collar, Catford (May 12, 610y, £1,500)
Pos	Name of Greyhound	Trainer	SP	Time	Trap
1st	Ramdeen Stuart	Norman Oliver	1-3f	35.04	1
2nd	Baton Rouge	Mick Hawkins	11-1	35.76	2
3rd	The Gent	Peter Isaac	25-1	36.02	3
4th	Salt Seller	Jenny March	7-1	36.12	4
5th	Starline Lady	Geoff De Mulder	5-1	36.60	6
6th	Crazyville Hi	Barney O'Connor	40-1	36.82	5

Oaks, Harringay (May 18, 525y, £1,500)
Pos	Name of Greyhound	Trainer	SP	Time	Trap
1st	Miss Ross	Tom Johnston Jr.	8-1	28.63	2
2nd	Softly	David Kinchett	11-8f	29.35	5
3rd	Snodzer		20-1	29.41	4
4th	Ahaveen Hunter	Peter Payne	9-4	29.51	1
5th	Carry on Hasty	Clare Orton	8-1	29.67	3
6th	Tawny Spike	Tom Johnston Jr.	4-1	dnf	6

The Grand Prix, Walthamstow (May 26, 700y, £1,250)
Pos	Name of Greyhound	Trainer	SP	Time	Trap
1st	Pendys Mermaid	Dave Geggus	11-8f	40.65	6
2nd	Arbutus Flash		25-1	40.71	3
3rd	Silver Mist	Reg Young	7-2	40.75	1
4th	Ashgrove Fun	John Horsfall	5-1	40.95	2
5th	Meadowbank Rose	Tom Reilly	8-1	41.11	4
6th	Ashgrove Tric		9-2	41.15	5

Scurry Gold Cup, Clapton (Jul 7, 400y £1,000)
Pos	Name of Greyhound	Trainer	SP	Time	Trap
1st	Casa Miel	Joe Pickering	7-2	22.83	4
2nd	Brewery Hill	Joe Pickering	12-1	22.89	5
3rd	Cloons Airport		33-1	23.29	3
4th	Royal Spitfire	Mrs J Hawkins	3-1	23.67	1
5th	Fiery Copper	Geoff De Mulder	11-10f	23.68	2
6th	They're Off	Phil Rees Sr.	10-1	24.18	6

Skol Scottish Greyhound Derby, Shawfield (Jul 14, 525y, £2,000)
Pos	Name of Greyhound	Trainer	SP	Time	Trap
1st	Dashalong Chief	Adam Jackson	11-2	29.60	3
2nd	Barbadus	Harry Bamford	5-4f	29.64	4
3rd	Cooladine Super	Peter Harding	7-1	29.84	5
4th	Hairy Legs	Joe Pickering	8-1	29.90	6
5th	Pit Lamp	Norman Oliver	2-1	30.06	1
6th	Deise Sparks	Gordon Hodson	14-1	30.30	2

Welsh Derby, Arms Park (Jul 28, 525y £1,000)
Pos	Name of Greyhound	Trainer	SP	Time	Trap
1st	Silly Rocket	Bertie Gaynor	11-8f	29.56	6
2nd	Say Little	Colin McNally	3-1	29.64	3
3rd	Delrony Leader	Natalie Savva	5-1	29.66	2
4th	Broadway Melody	Harry Bamford	10-1	29.82	4
5th	Hot Air	Jack Simpson	8-1	29.92	1
6th	Quick Work	Adam Jackson	8-1	31.00	5

St Leger, Wembley (Sep 2, 700y, £2,500)
Pos	Name of Greyhound	Trainer	SP	Time	Trap
1st	Case Money	Ted Parker	6-4jf	39.89	2
2nd	Hot System	Geoff De Mulder	5-1	40.15	1
3rd	Poor Rudolf	Randy Singleton	33-1	40.23	6
4th	Pertinacious	George Curtis	7-1	40.33	3
5th	Shara Dee	Noreen Collin	6-4jf	40.34	5
6th	Todos Ozzie	Sid Ryall	9-1	40.36	4

Laurels, Wimbledon (Sep 21, 500y, £3,000)
Pos	Name of Greyhound	Trainer	SP	Time	Trap
1st	Black Banjo	Barney O'Connor	5-2cf	27.93	4
2nd	Dashalong Chief	Adam Jackson	5-2cf	28.17	2
3rd	Silly Rocket	Bertie Gaynor	6-1	28.29	1
4th	Sunny Gold	Ted Dickson	6-1	28.35	5
5th	Sunshine Times	Tom Reilly	5-2cf	28.38	3
6th	Lightning Silver		16-1	28.54	6

Cesarewitch, Belle Vue (Sep 29, 880y, £2,000)
Pos	Name of Greyhound	Trainer	SP	Time	Trap
1st	Country Maiden	Frank Baldwin	5-2	52.46	5
2nd	Westmead Mia	Natalie Savva	9-4	52.52	3
3rd	Mosey Angus	John Gibbons	8-1	52.60	1
4th	Balliniska Gun	Arthur Hancock	10-1	52.64	4
5th	Todos Ozzie	Sid Ryall	7-4f	53.04	6
6th	Prince Leo		33-1	53.88	2

=== Principal Irish finals ===
Irish St Leger, Limerick (550y)
Pos	Name of Greyhound	Trap	SP	Time/Dis
1st	Romping To Work	1		31.04
2nd	Ritas Choice	3	5-2	1½
3rd	Bashful Man	6	6-4f	¾
4th	Kilbracken Style	5	7-1	
5th	China Sea	4	18-1	
6th	Nankies Pet	2	20-1	

== Totalisator returns ==
Extended content

The totalisator returns declared to the licensing authorities for the year 1973 are listed below.

Stadium	Turnover £
London (White City)	6,608,770
London (Walthamstow)	4,924,310
London (Wimbledon)	4,484,868
London (Harringay)	3,800,868
London (Wembley)	2,842,073
London (Catford)	2,612,018
Romford	2,221,780
Manchester (Belle Vue)	1,869,851
Edinburgh (Powderhall)	1,698,031
Brighton & Hove	1,692,463
Birmingham (Perry Barr, old)	1,602,019
London (Clapton)	1,550,556
Crayford & Bexleyheath	1,453,917
Birmingham (Hall Green)	1,401,377
Glasgow (Shawfield)	1,319,470

Stadium	Turnover £
Newcastle (Brough Park)	1,232,517
Southend-on-Sea	1,144,460
Slough	1,125,361
Leeds (Elland Road)	1,074,820
London (Hackney)	1,006,172
Sheffield (Owlerton)	928,476
Manchester (White City)	870,705
Wolverhampton (Monmore)	775,271
Bristol (Eastville)	753,344
Gloucester & Cheltenham	743,425
Newcastle (Gosforth)	656,175
Derby	623,363
Cardiff (Arms Park)	622,208
Rochester & Chatham	621,252
Manchester (Salford)	584,223

Stadium	Turnover £
Willenhall	575,477
Poole	496,294
Oxford	486,343
Portsmouth	482,106
Ramsgate (Dumpton Park)	440,641
Rayleigh (Essex)	385,933
Cradley Heath	348,136
Middlesbrough	303,901
Leicester (Blackbird Rd)	286,578
Hull (Old Craven Park)	282,638
Swindon	226,598
Milton Keynes	187,397
Preston	177,742
