= 1981 English Greyhound Derby =

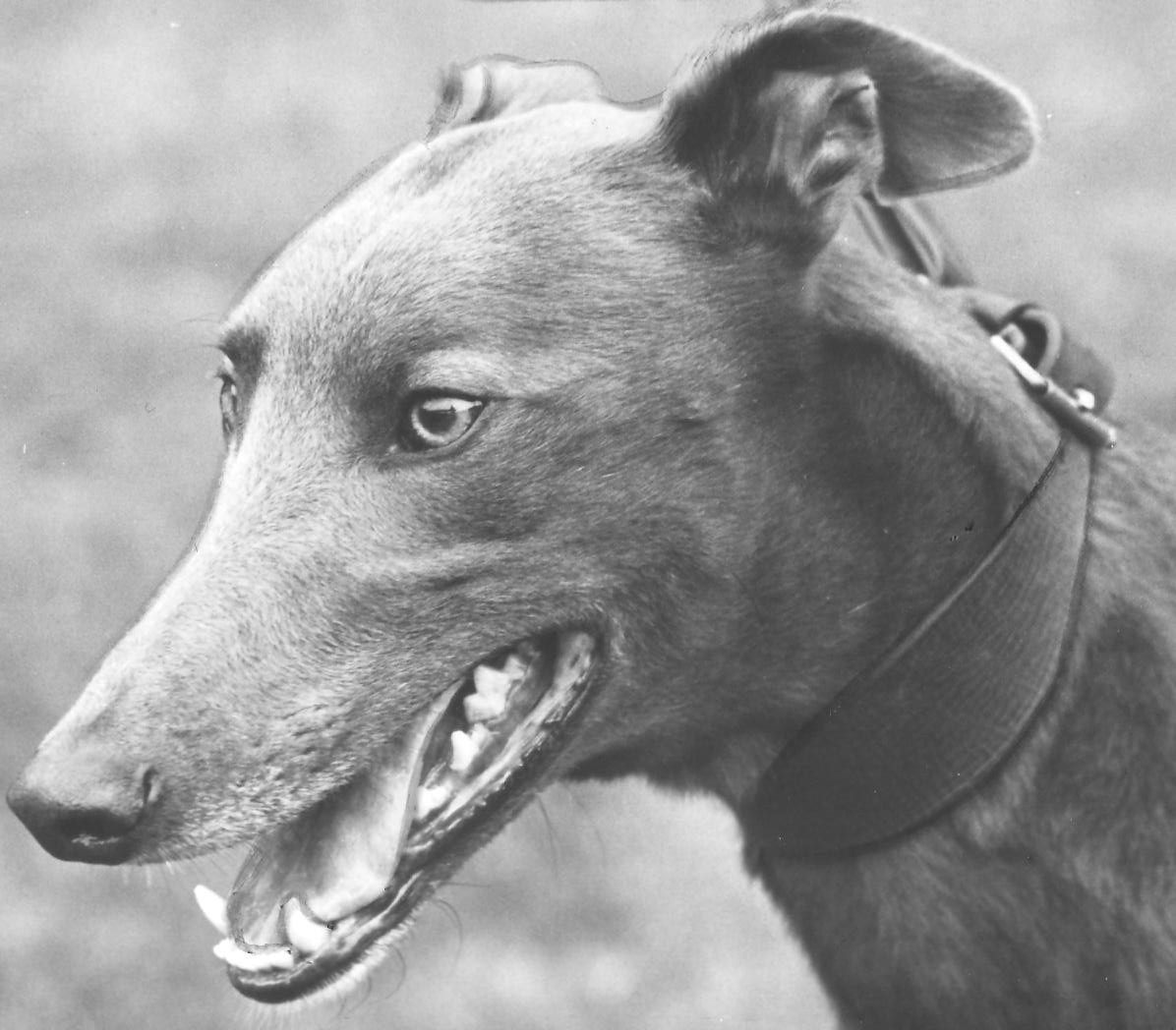
- Parkdown Jet
- Location: White City Stadium
- End date: 27 June
- Total prize money: £25,000 (winner)

The 1981 Spillers Greyhound Derby took place during June with the final being held on 27 June 1981 at White City Stadium. The winner was Parkdown Jet and the winning owners Sean and Mick Barnett received £25,000. The competition was sponsored by the Spillers.

== Final result ==
At White City (over 500 metres):

Position	Name of Greyhound	Breeding	Trap	SP	Time	Trainer
1st	Parkdown Jet	Cairnville Jet - Gabriel Ruby	6	4-5f	29.57	Ger McKenna (Ireland)
2nd	Prince Spy	Peruvian Style - Dainty Beauty	2	33-1	29.61	Geoff De Mulder (Private)
3rd	Rahan Ship	Rail Ship - Rwanyena	1	2-1	29.69	John Haynes (Ireland)
4th	Clohast Flame	Glen Rock - Clohastsovereign	4	7-2	29.81	John Honeysett (Crayford)
5th	Im Flight	Sand Man - Maythorn Pride	5	33-1	29.95	Matt O'Donnell (Ireland)
6th	Barley Field	Itsachampion - Bawnogue Ivy	3	14-1	00.00	Joe Kelly (Owlerton)

=== Distances ===
½, 1, 1½, ¾, dis (lengths)
The distances between the greyhounds are in finishing order and shown in lengths. One length is equal to 0.08 of one second.

== Competition Report ==
The Irish sent a strong team to defend the title that they had won the previous year which included the Ger McKenna trained Parkdown Jet and the John Haynes trained Rahan Ship (Irish Cesarewitch and Irish St Leger winner). Francie Murray also sent a team of eight headed by Hurry on Bran the 1980 runner-up who had switched kennels to Murray from Eric Pateman. The leading British entries were Juvenile champion Upland Tiger, Pall Mall Stakes winner Creamery Pat, Deel Joker and the Geoff DeMulder trio of North Rain, Heres Gay and Prince Spy.

Before the Derby started a virus hit the Irish runners which affected the Francie Murray dogs owned by Eddie Costello. Precious Time trained by Jill Holt was the pick of the first round winners recording 29.20, just ahead of Rahan Ship 29.26 and Heres Gay 29.27. In the second round Rahan Ship was beaten by Hurry on Bran but both qualified despite the fact that the latter had suffered two dislocated toes during the race. Heres Gay and Upland Tiger both failed to progress any further.

Hurry on Bran was being treated by vet Paddy Sweeney but failed to make the quarter-finals and had to be withdrawn and was later retired to stud. The quarter-finals started with a win for Parkdown Jet whilst Precious Time crashed out. Hot favourites Clohast Flame and Rahan Ship took the next two heats before Greenane Metro won the last heat remaining unbeaten for trainer Arthur Hitch.

The first semi-final resulted in Parkdown Jet setting a new track record time of 29.09, Barley Field and In Flight finished five lengths behind with Greenane Metro failing to progress. The second semi went the way of Rahan Ship from Clohast Flame; Prince Spy ran on to beat early leader Deel Joker for the final qualifying place.

The final saw a first bend melee resulting in Barley Field falling and Rahan Ship jumping over him as he fell. Clohast Flame and In Flight were hampered as well which left Parkdown Jet clear followed by Prince Spy. Parkdown Jet having just his ninth race for owners Mick and Sean Barnett held off Prince Spy to win with Rahan Ship making significant ground on the pair coming home an unlucky third.

== See also ==
- 1981 UK & Ireland Greyhound Racing Year
