= Golden Crest =

UK greyhound racing competition

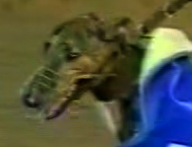
- 1988 winner Peasedown Slippy
- Class: Defunct - Category 2
- Location: Eastville Stadium /Poole Stadium
- Inaugurated: 1937
- Final run: 2019

Race information
- Distance: various
- Surface: Sand

The Golden Crest was a greyhound racing competition held annually at Poole Stadium.

It was inaugurated in 1937 at Eastville Stadium in Bristol. Eastville closed in 1997 and the event was suspended until Poole resurrected it in 2000.

With the closure of the track on 22 September 2020 the competition was discontinued.

== Venues & Distances ==
- 1937–1939 (Eastville, Bristol, 525 yards)
- 1941–1957 (Eastville, Bristol, 500 yards)
- 1958–1997 (Eastville, Bristol, 525 yards)
- 2014–2014 (Poole, 640 metres)
- 2000–2019 (Poole, 450 metres)

== Sponsors ==
- 2011–2013 (Dave Lawrance)
- 2019–2019 (Racing Post TV)

== Past winners ==
Year	Winner	Breeding	Trainer	Time	SP	Notes/ref
1937	Wily Captain	Lawyers Fee – Whirlwave	Joe Harmon (Wimbledon)	30.48	9/2	
1938	Glen Ranger	Mick the Miller – Great Ranee	Les Parry (White City - London)	30.02	1/2f	
1939	Saucy Moon		Tal Parker (Hall Green)	30.77	7/4f	
1940	not held due to World War II					
1941	Prince Norroy	Castledown Lad – Ruddy Mutton	Paddy Fortune (Wimbledon)	29.11	3/1	
1942	Irish Choice		Tal Parker (Bristol)	29.31	1/1f	
1943	Wireless Delight	Wireless Rally – Erin Green	Sidney Orton (Wimbledon)	29.01	3/1	
1944	Fair and Handsome	Cremeary Border – Gows Pride	Mrs Renie McKay (Coventry)	28.96	1/2f	
1945	Shannon Shore	Well Squared - Second Row	Leslie Reynolds (Wembley)	28.76	13/8	Track record
1946	Rimmells Black	Manhattan Midnight - Drishogue	Stanley Biss (Clapton)	28.69	5/2jf	
1947	Funny Mick	Ruby Border – Olives Idol	Bob Burls (Wembley)	28.81	11/4	
1948	Freckled Major	Fair Major – White Tempest	Leslie Reynolds (Wembley)	29.34	4/1	
1949	Flintfield Grosvenor	Grosvenor Flexion - Blue Fire	D Hayes (Coventry)	28.83	11/8jf	
1950	Behattans Choice	Bahs Choice - Behattan	Bob Burls (Wembley)	28.58	15/8f	
1951	Palm Beach	The Grand Fire – Don't Bet	Stan Martin (Wimbledon)	29.02	7/2	
1952	Rushton Smutty	Mad Tanist - Summer Frock	Frank Johnson (Private)	28.52	7/2	
1953	Parkroe Bob	Disputed Dick – Beechwood	Jack Young (Oxford)	28.68	10/11f	
1954	Wayside Abbey	Bellas Prince – Wayside Peg	Joe Farrand (Reading)	28.79	10/11f	
1955	Kensington Bramble	Black Invasion – Lambourn Firefly	Marjorie Phipps (Oxford)	28.76	6/1	
1956	Darkies Son	Slaney Record – C.Last	F McCarthy (Arms Park, Cardiff)	28.03	20/1	
1957	Brooklands Hunter	Fly Prince – Brooklands Rose	H Harding (Private)	28.50	5/2	
1958	Lovely Cobh	Fire Prince - Inlo	F McCarthy (Arms Park, Cardiff)	29.89	5/2	
1959	Monnow Wizzard	Endless Gossip – Monnow Vee	Stan Raymond (Bristol)	30.23	7/1	
1960	Hack Up Friend	The Grand Fire – Hack Up Nell	Mrs E.Eade (Private)	29.81	4/1	
1961	Yes Man	Officer Pete – Fast Enough	Brian Jay (Perry Barr)	29.79	11/4	
1962	Fealeside Bridge	Broadway Darkie II – Fealeside Hill	Brian Jay (Perry Barr)	29.39	4/6f	
1963	Collateral	Hi Con – Maries Slipper	John Drown (Private)	29.46	1/1f	
1964	Rattle The Man	Jungle Man – Red Hot	Ronnie Mills (Gloucester)	29.81	2/1jf	
1965	Tony's Blaze	Hop It Rory – Tony's Flame	Frank White (Private)	29.78	7/2	
1966	Clahane Mick	Knock Hill Chieftain – Clahane Girl	Brian Jay (Perry Barr)	29.54	5/1	
1967	Mystic Prairie	Prairie Flash – Real Whitesocks	Jim Todd (Kings Heath)	29.40	7/4f	
1968	Discretions	Prairie Flash – Sheila At Last	Dave Geggus (Walthamstow)	27.90	4/7f	
1969	Brookfield Earl	Greenane Flash – Lady Earl	Ron Chamberlain (Private)	28.63	8-1	
1970	Moordyke Spot	Newdown Heather – Nelsons Farewell	Stan Martin (Wimbledon)	28.74	9/4	
1971	Clonarrow Piper	Stoneview Jet – Lovely Present	Hazel Walden (Private)	28.83	10/1	
1972	Royal Spitfire	Newdown Heather – Ardine Guest	Mick Hawkins (Private)	28.86	2/1	
1973	Maureen's Ben	Yanka Boy – Susie Dean	Janet Tite (Private)	28.61	11/2	
1974	Last Rocket	Monalee Champion – Rylane Glory	Ray Burton (Arms Park, Cardiff)	28.75	3/1	
1975	Daemonic Gambol	Don't Gambol – Dusk Gambol	Paddy McEvoy (Wimbledon)	28.74	1/3f	
1976	Country Man	Kilbelin Style – More Knocks	John Coleman (Wembley)	28.78	6/4f	
1977	Rathduff Spring	Quiet Spring – Tudor Reflection	Geoff De Mulder (Hall Green)	28.58	9/2	
1978	DollaArkle	Monalee Arkle – Lively Air	John Coleman (Wembley)	28.62	1/2f	
1979	Our Rufus	Rail Ship – Geraldine Gold	John Coleman (Wembley)	28.39	4/5f	
1980	Jack's Asleep	Fast Asleep – Herons Highlight	Paul Garland (Bristol)	28.25	5/2f	
1981	Astral Cloud	Ceili Band – Cherry Band	Jerry Fisher (Private)	28.34	5/2jf	
1984	Too Ton Tony	Pecos Jerry – Feet First	Mervyn Osborne (Bristol)	28.65	7/4f	
1985	Go Eddie Flat Cap	Sams Effort – Dark Bird	P Stanley (Norton Canes)	28.57	5/4f	
1986	Slim Figure	Key Figure – Blonde Peruvian	Geoff De Mulder (Oxford)	28.77	7/1	
1987	Woodman	Badge of Hickory – Fancy Slipper	Fred Wiseman (Milton Keynes)	28.48	4/5f	
1988	Peasedown Slippy	Im Slippy – Lannon Lass	Tony Mann (Swindon)	28.49	7/4f	
1989	Handsome Dan	Manorville Sand – Scarriff Slave	Geoff De Mulder (Norton Canes)	28.84	4/7f	
1990	Plough Jack	Kyle Jack – Caherlean Rose	Tony Meek (Oxford)	29.11	11/10f	
1991	Bangor Reel	Curryhills Fox – Bangor Bran	Terry Kibble (Bristol)	28.71	11/4	
1992	Pitter Patter	Shanagarry Duke – Smokey Snowdrop	Vernon Clapp (Bristol)	28.04	7/1	
1993	Ginger Jenny	Lodge Prince – Garryduff Lassie	Peter Swadden (Bristol)	28.19	6/4f	
1994	Gunsmoke	Druids Johno- Kalamity Kelly	Tony Meek (Hall Green)	28.11	13/8	
2000	Arleswood Spirit	Shanless Slippy – Midas Blue	Owen McKenna (Wimbledon)	27.30	9/4	
2001	Docs Arizona	Trade Official – Lisnak Slippy	Owen McKenna (Wimbledon)	27.24	13/8jf	
2002	Blue Gooner	Staplers Jo - Code Dancer	Brian Clemenson (Hove)	26.90	6/4	
2003	Palacemews Lad	Roanokee - Lisnak Slippy	John Mullins (Walthamstow)	27.03	8/1	
2004	Foxcover Jed	Come On Ranger - Covert Blossom	Daphne Mann (Poole)	27.39	9/4Jf	
2005	Pennys Cadet	Top Honcho - Droopys Valencia	Brian Clemenson (Hove)	27.12	7/2	
2006	Farloe Stormy	Top Honcho - Flashing Storm	Paul Foster (Swindon)	27.27	6/4f	
2007	Rhyzome Wizard	Toms The Best - Shanroe Jewel	Graham Cleverley (Swindon)	26.71	3/1	
2008	Black Taxi	Larkhill Jo - Lagile Ash	John Mullins (Yarmouth)	26.96	7/4f	
2009	Outandgoodnight	Honcho Classic – Droopys Perlena	Mark Grady (Poole)	26.56	11/10f	
2010	Lynnwood Bolt	Razldazl Billy-Darkeyed Girl	Graham Cleverley (Poole)	26.53	5/4f	
2011	Fifis Rocket	Brett Lee-Droopys Ruby	Chris Allsopp (Monmore)	26.46	4/5f	
2012	Out In Chil	Bit Chilli – Miss Shauna	Phil Chatfield (Poole)	26.99	9/4	
2013	Daddy Knowsbest	Big Daddy Cool – Bridie Knowsbet	Chris Allsopp (Monmore)	26.20	5/2f	Track record
2014	Romantic Rambo	Crash – Moment of Time	Kevin Cobbold (Henlow)	38.79	11/8f	
2015	Aimnfire	Central City – Droopys Solange	June Harvey (Poole)	26.57	2/1	
2016	Castlehyde King	Hondo Black – Goosabyrnes Solange	Bill Black (Poole)	26.36	9/2	
2017	Crossfield Giles	Sparta Maestro - Crossfield Betty	Seamus Cahill (Hove)	26.27	9/2	
2018	Headford Kev	Iso Octane - Tyrur Tulisa	Kevin Hutton (Towcester)	26.81	5/2	
2019	King Elvis	Tullymurry Act - Skate On	Liz McNair (Private)	26.70	4/6f	

Discontinued
