= 1973 English Greyhound Derby =

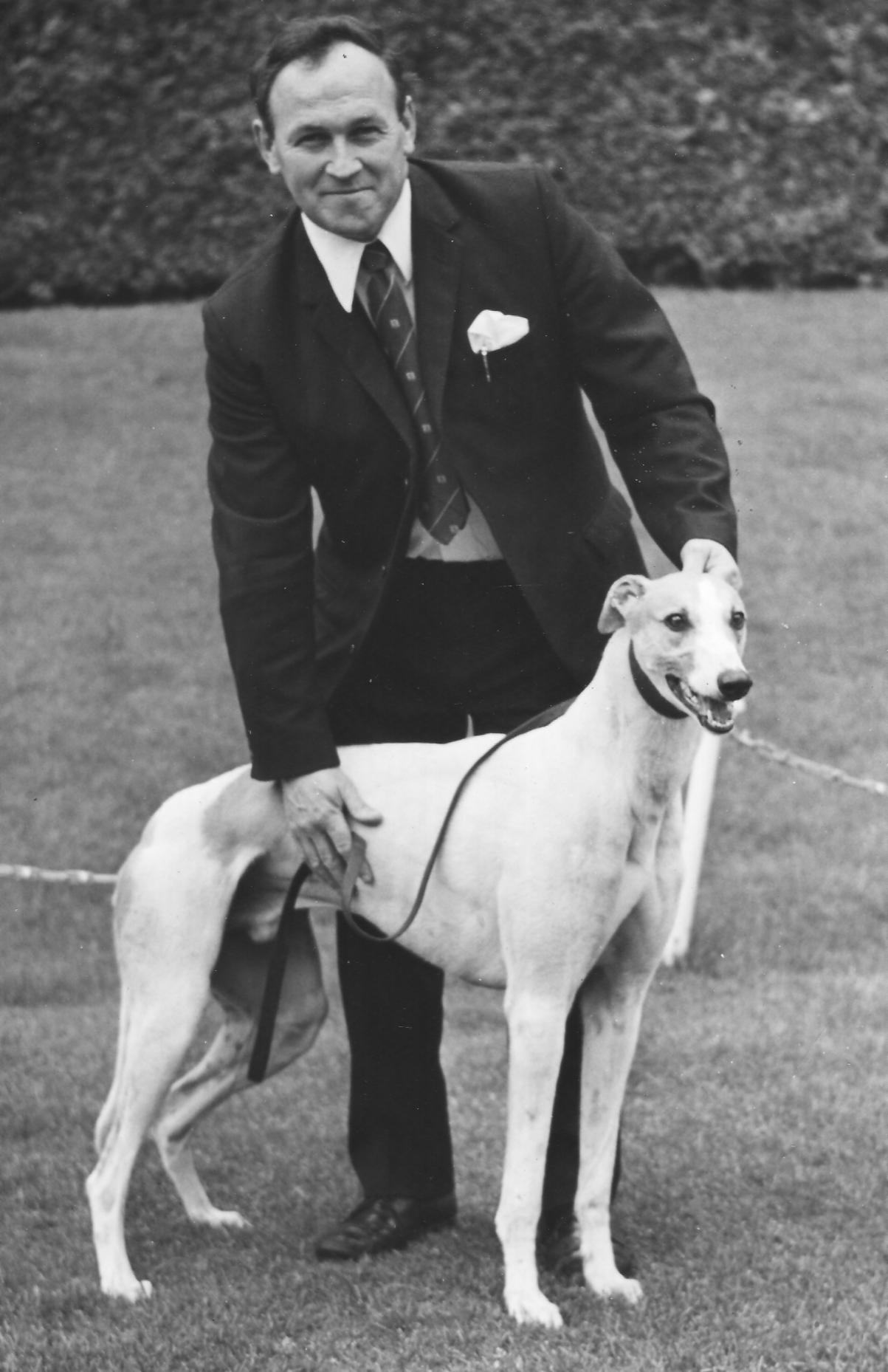
- Patricias Hope with trainer John O'Connor
- Location: White City Stadium
- Start date: 9 June
- End date: 23 June
- Total prize money: £12,500 (winner)

The 1973 Spillers Greyhound Derby took place in June, with the final being held on 23 June 1973 at White City Stadium. The winning greyhood was Patricias Hope and the winning owners Gordon Marks, B Marks and John O'Connor received £12,500. The competition was sponsored by the Spillers.

== Competition Report ==
A new sponsor was secured for the Derby in the form of Spillers Foods, famous for the Winalot brand and they would offer record prize money. The total fund was £22,000, with £12,500 going to the winner with the race being broadcast live and in colour by World of Sport.

Peoples favourite Patricias Hope returned from stud duties (where he had covered some 36 bitches) in an attempt to become only the second greyhound to successfully defend the title after Mick the Miller. John O'Connor from Cork had taken over Brian Stanley's share of the white and fawn dog and would train him for the duration of the competition. The event attracted 151 entries with the market leaders including Ramdeen Stuart, Irish entry Westpark Mustard, Oaks champion Miss Ross, Northern based Pit Lamp and Priory Hill, Grand National winner Killone Flash, Pall Mall Stakes champion Forest Noble, Juvenile winner Black Banjo and Edinburgh Cup and Circuit winner Say Little.

There were 26 qualifying trials to reduce the entries to just 48 starters. In the qualifying rounds Dunmore Spring Cup winner Suburban Gent recorded the fastest time of 28.80 but suffered an injury in the first round and would take no further part. Of the market leaders Patricias Hope went fastest in the first round heats with only Ramdeen Stuart, Black Banjo and Say Little surviving to round two. The second round draw threw up a very strong heat which ended with Say Little holding off Patricias Hope with Ramdeen Stuart going out. The first semi-final was secured by Forest Noble from Softly and Say Little in a very competitive race. The second semi saw Breakaway Town take a short head victory from Black Banjo, third place went to Patricias Hope keeping his dream alive.

In the final Say Little had been well-backed at 50-1 ante-post in his home village of Hill Ridware near Uttoxeter, was sent off 6-4 favourite. Both Say Little and Patricias Hope started well missing crowding at the first bend. Patricias Hope gained a lead before Softly showed good back straight pace to pass Say Little. The pair remained behind Patricias Hope and Forest Noble began to make a move, but Patricias Hope held on in a thrilling finish to win by a half a length in 28.68sec, four hounds finished within 10 spots of each other.

Patricias Hope had emulated Mick the Miller's achievement of 1930 becoming only the second greyhound to win the English Greyhound Derby twice.

== Final result ==
At White City (over 525 yards):

Position	Name of Greyhound	Breeding	Trap	SP	Time	Trainer
1st	Patricias Hope	Silver Hope - Patsicia	5	7-2	28.68	John O'Connor (Ireland)
2nd	Softly	Kilbeg Kuda - Cludog	4	12-1	28.72	Dave Kinchett (Shawfield)
3rd	Say Little	Albany - Newhouse Blue	6	6-4f	28.75	Colin McNally (Perry Barr)
4th	Forest Noble	Prince of Roses - Forest Brown	1	3-1	28.78	Paddy McEvoy (Perry Barr)
5th	Black Banjo	Monalee Champion - Brook Densel	3	5-1	29.12	Barney O’Connor (Walthamstow)
6th	Breakaway Town	Monalee Champion - Hopeful Glen	2	10-1	00.00	Pat Mullins (Private)

=== Distances ===
½, neck, neck, 4¼, Dis (lengths)
The distances between the greyhounds are in finishing order and shown in lengths. One length is equal to 0.08 of one second.

== See also ==
- 1973 UK & Ireland Greyhound Racing Year
