= 1972 English Greyhound Derby =

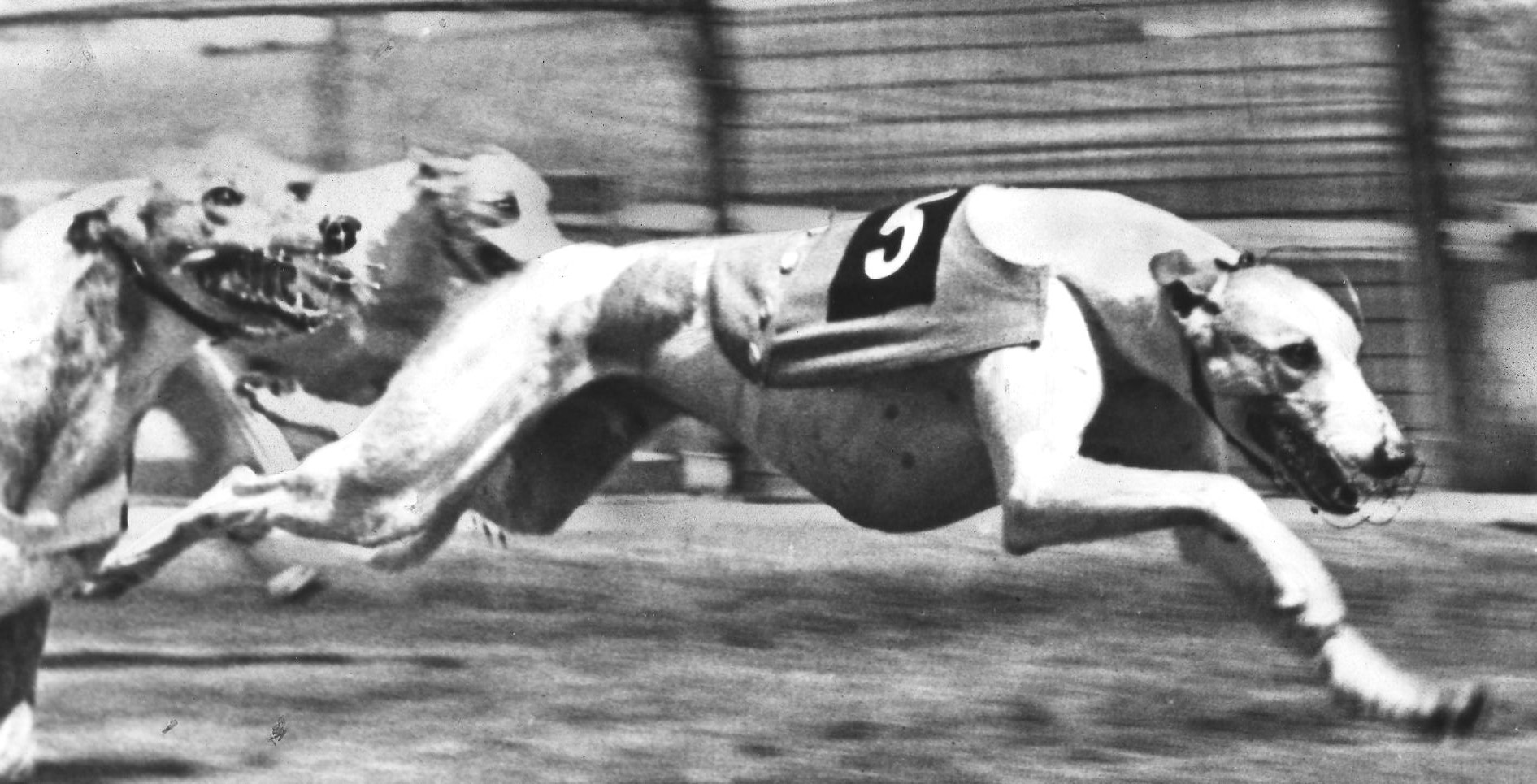
- Patricias Hope in action
- Location: White City Stadium
- Start date: 10 June
- End date: 24 June
- Total prize money: £10,952 (winner)

The 1972 Greyhound Derby took place during June with the final being held on 24 June 1972 at White City Stadium. The winner was Patricias Hope and the winning owners Brian Stanley, Gordon Marks and B Marks received £10,952.

== Competition Report ==
Ante-post favourites were Favourite Rory and Juvenile champion Short Interview. Oaks heroine Decimal Queen and the previous year's third placed greyhound Leap and Run were two other leading contenders.

The first round consisted of nine heats and three fast winners were Super Rory (28.59), Suburban Gent (28.65) and Westmead County (28.76), both ante-post favourites went out. When round two got underway Super Rory aged (only 20 months) recorded 28.36 to win heat two by five lengths from Patricias Hope; Westmead County was eliminated in the same heat. Irish entry Proud Life, Bally Lander from Walthamstow and Lucky Punter trained by Peter Hawkesley took the other heat wins.

Proud Life won again to claim the first semi-final from Patricias Hope and Micks Pride; hot favourite First Case trained by Tom Johnston Jr could only finish fifth. In the second semi-final Super Rory became the fastest greyhound in the world by setting a time 28.26 sec when winning and bettering his father's (Yellow Printer) time.

An anonymous offer of £12,000 was followed by a £14,000 by Freddie Warrell for Super Rory but both were turned down and he was sent to traps as the 4-9 favourite for the final. Super Rory failed to trap well after being unsettled by the Derby roar* but Patricias Hope did trap well and went on to record a comfortable victory.

Note
Derby roar* (the noise made by the crowd when the electric hare is set in motion)

== Final result ==
At White City (over 525 yards):

| Position | Name of Greyhound | Breeding | Trap | SP | Time | Trainer |
|---|---|---|---|---|---|---|
| 1st | Patricias Hope | Silver Hope - Patsicia | 5 | 7-1 | 28.55 | Adam Jackson (Clapton) |
| 2nd | Bally Lander | Powerstown Proper - Peg the Gag | 4 | 16-1 | 28.81 | Tom 'Paddy' Reilly (Walthamstow) |
| 3rd | Micks Pride | Carry On Oregon - Frank Refusal | 6 | 25-1 | 28.83 | Bob Burls (Wembley) |
| 4th | Scintillas Gem | Spectre II - Scintillas Second | 1 | 7-1 | 28.93 | Paddy Milligan (Private) |
| 5th | Super Rory | Yellow Printer - Laharn Beauty | 3 | 4-9f | 29.01 | Noreen Collin (White City - London) |
| 6th | Proud Life | Always Proud - Rich Life | 2 | 8-1 | 29.29 | Max Davis (Ireland) |

=== Distances ===
3¼, head, 1¼, 1, 3½ (lengths)
The distances between the greyhounds are in finishing order and shown in lengths. One length is equal to 0.08 of one second.

== Quarter finals ==
Heat 1
| Pos | Name | SP | Time |
|---|---|---|---|
| 1st | Proud Life | 8-1 | 28.81 |
| 2nd | First Case | 4-5f | 28.84 |
| 3rd | Abbey Chestnut | 5-1 | 28.98 |
| 4th | Deneholme Chief | 4-1 | 29.22 |
| 5th | Linmaree | 10-1 | 29.46 |
| 6th | Itsaladdie | 14-1 | 29.58 |

Heat 2
| Pos | Name | SP | Time |
|---|---|---|---|
| 1st | Super Rory | 7-4 | 28.36 |
| 2nd | Scintillas Gem | 8-1 | 28.76 |
| 3rd | Patricias Hope | 9-2 | 28.82 |
| 4th | Westmead County | 6-4f | 29.14 |
| 5th | Kybo Venture | 20-1 | 29.18 |
| 6th | Camira Story | 20-1 | 29.20 |

Heat 3
| Pos | Name | SP | Time |
|---|---|---|---|
| 1st | Bally Lander | 10-1 | 28.82 |
| 2nd | Suburban Gent | 4-9f | 28.96 |
| 3rd | Hover Bee | 20-1 | 29.10 |
| 4th | Pepper Joe | 16-1 | 29.16 |
| 5th | Tall King | 10-1 | 29.46 |
| 6th | Peters Black | 5-1 | 30.02 |

Heat 4
| Pos | Name | SP | Time |
|---|---|---|---|
| 1st | Lucky Punter | 4-6f | 28.67 |
| 2nd | Black Andrew | 11-4 | 28.82 |
| 3rd | Micks Pride | 33-1 | 28.86 |
| 4th | Itsachampion | 4-1 | 28.94 |
| 5th | Toms Pal | 16-1 | 29.02 |
| 6th | Mullas Shore | 10-1 | 29.14 |

== Semi finals ==
First Semi Final (Jun 17)
| Pos | Name of Greyhound | SP | Time | Trainer |
|---|---|---|---|---|
| 1st | Proud Life | 9-2 | 28.83 | Davis |
| 2nd | Patricias Hope | 4-1 | 28.84 | Jackson |
| 3rd | Micks Pride | 20-1 | 28.86 | Burls |
| 4th | Black Andrew | 3-1 | 28.94 | Singleton |
| 5th | First Case | 5-4f | 29.02 | Johnston |
| 6th | Hover Bee | 40-1 | 29.18 | West |

Second Semi Final (Jun 17)
| Pos | Name of Greyhound | SP | Time | Trainer |
|---|---|---|---|---|
| 1st | Super Rory | 8-13f | 28.26+ | Collin |
| 2nd | Bally Lander | 20-1 | 28.78 | Reilly |
| 3rd | Scintillas Gem | 12-1 | 28.86 | Milligan |
| 4th | Abbey Chestnut | 33-1 | 28.90 | Pickering |
| 5th | Suburban Gent | 7-2 | 28.94 | Horan |
| 6th | Lucky Punter | 5-1 | 29.28 | Hawkesley |

+ World and track record

== See also ==
- 1972 UK & Ireland Greyhound Racing Year
