= 1980 UK & Ireland Greyhound Racing Year =

The 1980 UK & Ireland Greyhound Racing Year was the 55th year of greyhound racing in the United Kingdom and the 54th year of greyhound racing in Ireland.

== Roll of honour ==
Major Winners
Award	Name of Winner
1980 English Greyhound Derby	Indian Joe
1980 Irish Greyhound Derby	Suir Miller
1980 Scottish Greyhound Derby	Decoy Sovereign
Greyhound Trainer of the Year	Pat Mullins
Greyhound of the Year	Sport Promoter
Irish Greyhound of the Year	Indian Joe
Trainers Championship	Ted Dickson

== Summary ==
The National Greyhound Racing Club (NGRC) released the annual returns, with totalisator turnover up 10%, at £81,290,642 but attendances down 15%, recorded at 5,484,781 from 5504 meetings. The increase in tote turnover indicated a significant increase in spend per head because attendances had decreased significantly. The decrease could partly be blamed on 200 less meetings but the fact that tracks charged a 17% tote retention would have been another factor. Regardless of blame it was the lowest attendance return on record, even less than the first full year of racing in 1927.

Sport Promoter, a brindle dog was voted Greyhound of the Year. He won Gold Collar at Catford Stadium and the Grand Prix at Walthamstow Stadium.

== Tracks ==
Nottingham Greyhound Stadium opened on 24 January.

Ladbrokes closed Willenhall for development and cut prize money at Perry Barr and Monmore. Eastville Stadium suffered a major fire, and the majority of the south stand was destroyed causing more than £1 million worth of damage. Later in the year some consolation arrived in the form of a Bookmakers Afternoon Greyhound Service (BAGS) debut in November, and along with Hackney would become the backbone of the betting shop service. Monmore also joined the BAGS, which is currently supplied by White City Manchester, Hackney, Wembley and Harringay.

Bletchley in Milton Keynes under the new promotion of Reg Young rejoined the NGRC under the permit scheme and would become known as Milton Keynes Stadium instead of Bletchley. Maidstone and Long Eaton would leave the scheme and the Knott family sold their interest in Poole Stadium.

== News ==
An outbreak of Parvovirus killed hundreds of pups in the early part of the year. The Greyhound Racing Association (GRA) continue to recover from their debt and repay creditors. Arthur Hancock retired as a trainer at Brighton and was replaced by GRA trainer Derek Knight who had previously been at Shawfield.

== Ireland ==
The Bord na gCon increase prize money by a further 25%. Knockrour Slave won the Irish Laurels for the second successive year and break the Cork Greyhound Stadium track record in the final recording 29.00 sec.

== Competitions ==
1979 Greyhound of the Year Desert Pilot reached the St Leger final at Wembley Greyhounds and performed well but lost out to Fair Reward trained by Bob Young with Decoy Sovereign runner up. Decoy Sovereign was trained by the Cobbold family Joe Cobbold and wife Doreen and had been bred by Brenda Baggs, wife of Gary Baggs who were helping the Cobbolds at the time. Decoy Sovereign easily won the Scottish Greyhound Derby final, the fawn dog defeated a good field. A greyhound called Rahan Ship has been ante post favourite for the Glasgow classic but had been withdrawn following the wrong form being printed in the racecard. The NGRC instigated an inquiry and some track officials lost their jobs before the dog returned to Ireland.

== Principal UK races ==
BBC TV Trophy, Wembley (Apr 2, 850m, £2,000)
Pos	Name of Greyhound	Trainer	SP	Time	Trap
1st	Tread Fast	Graham Sharp	53.20	12-1	2
2nd	Welsh Cobbler	John Honeysett	53.24	9-2	5
3rd	Flighty Frances		53.26	8-1	4
4th	Gloss	Bette Godwin	53.44	9-2	6
5th	Major Snoot	K Burgess	53.88	16-1	3
6th	Roystons Supreme	Adam Jackson	00.00	11-10f	1

Grand National, White City (April 5 500m h, £4,000)
Pos	Name of Greyhound	Trainer	SP	Time	Trap
1st	Gilt Edge Flyer	Eric Pateman	4-5f	30.22	1
2nd	Westlands Steve	Gunner Smith	10-1	30.92	4
3rd	Teenage Heather	David Kinchett	20-1	30.95	3
4th	Ballymena Moon	George Curtis	4-1	31.11	6
5th	Scintillas Rock	Frank Melville	16-1	31.63	5
6th	Right Arkle	Ted Dickson	4-1	00.00	2

Laurels, Wimbledon (May 16, 460m, £3,000)
Pos	Name of Greyhound	Trainer	SP	Time	Trap
1st	Flying Pursuit	John Gibbons	6-4f	27.89	4
2nd	Jon Barrie	Ray Andrews	8-1	28.07	5
3rd	Lift Coming	Dick Hawkes	5-2	28.25	6
4th	Dangerous Lad	Joe Pickering	7-2	28.45	1
5th	The Grand Devil	Phil Rees Jr.	14-1	28.55	2
6th	Super Countess		12-1	28.59	3

Scurry Gold Cup, Slough (Jul 19, 442m, £5,000)
Pos	Name of Greyhound	Trainer	SP	Time	Trap
1st	Willing Slave	Ted Dickson	2-1	27.11	1
2nd	Ballydonnell Ted		6-1	27.15	5
3rd	Able Worker	Nora Gleeson	7-1	27.59	3
4th	Lancia Q	Paddy McEvoy	7-1	27.63	2
5th	Alpine Mill		16-1	27.65	6
6th	Sunny Interval	Phil Rees Jr.	7-4f	27.69	4

Scottish Greyhound Derby, Shawfield (Aug 9, 500m, £3,000)
Pos	Name of Greyhound	Trainer	SP	Time	Trap
1st	Decoy Sovereign	Joe Cobbold	4-1	30.68	5
2nd	Coolarota	Ray Andrews	10-1	31.16	3
3rd	Jon Barrie	Ray Andrews	5-4f	31.32	2
4th	Corleish Ron		10-1	31.38	4
5th	Barley Field	Joe Kelly	5-2	31.62	1
6th	Town View Evert	Ray Andrews	7-1	31.66	6

St Leger, Wembley (655m, £10,000)
Pos	Name of Greyhound	Trainer	SP	Time	Trap
1st	Fair Reward	Bob Young	5-2	40.46	2
2nd	Decoy Sovereign	Joe Cobbold	8-1	40.58	6
3rd	Desert Pilot	Geoff De Mulder	4-5f	40.61	1
4th	Donore Speech		18-1	40.71	3
5th	Sport Promoter	Pat Mullins	6-1	40.81	4
6th	Owners Guide	Tony Jowett	100-1	40.91	5

Gold Collar, Catford (Sep 20, 555m, £5,000)
Pos	Name of Greyhound	Trainer	SP	Time	Trap
1st	Sport Promoter	Pat Mullins	8-15f	35.06	5
2nd	Owners Guide	Tony Jowett	8-1	35.22	6
3rd	Tivoli Town	John Cox	4-1	35.34	2
4th	Cormacruiser		7-1	35.46	1
5th	Fly Muffin		25-1	35.68	4
6th	Westmead Echo		16-1	35.78	3

Cesarewitch, Belle Vue (Oct 4, 815m, £3,500)
Pos	Name of Greyhound	Trainer	SP	Time	Trap
1st	Linkside Liquor	Gordon Bailey	3-1	51.22	2
2nd	Visiting Time		2-1f	51.25	3
3rd	Tread Fast	Graham Sharp	3-1	51.28	4
4th	Roystons Supreme	Adam Jackson	14-1	51.34	5
5th	Petite Silver		25-1	51.62	6
6th	Caesars Daughter	J Williamson	3-1	51.76	1

The Grand Prix, Walthamstow (Oct 18, 640m, £5,500)
Pos	Name of Greyhound	Trainer	SP	Time	Trap
1st	Sport Promoter	Pat Mullins	2-1jf	40.17	4
2nd	North Rain	Geoff De Mulder	11-4	40.25	5
3rd	Boys Town	Pat Mullins	6-1	40.33	6
4th	Honeygar Kid	Ray Andrews	66-1	40.63	2
5th	Knockerlay Star	Adam Jackson	2-1jf	40.69	3
6th	Johns Luck	Norah McEllistrim	20-1	41.25	1

Oaks, Harringay (Oct 31, 475m, £1,750)
Pos	Name of Greyhound	Trainer	SP	Time	Trap
1st	Devilish Dolores	Ernie Gaskin Sr.	20-1	28.72	4
2nd	Pacey	Miss R Sperry	5-2	28.78	6
3rd	The Mill Queen	Tom Foster	9-4f	28.79	5
4th	Thanet Princess	Tom Foster	14-1	29.01	2
5th	Roystons Damsel	Adam Jackson	11-4	29.05	1
6th	Day Dream	Wally Ginzel	7-2	29.17	3

== Totalisator returns ==
Extended content

The totalisator returns declared to the National Greyhound Racing Club for the year 1980 are listed below.

Stadium	Turnover £
London (White City)	8,601,270
London (Walthamstow)	8,410,073
London (Wimbledon)	6,337,216
London (Harringay)	4,379,421
Romford	4,030,569
London (Catford)	3,950,040
Brighton & Hove	3,648,558
Slough	3,409,122
London (Wembley)	3,302,233
Manchester (Belle Vue)	3,006,025
Birmingham (Hall Green)	2,544,020
Crayford & Bexleyheath	2,387,655
Edinburgh (Powderhall)	2,270,729
Newcastle (Brough Park)	1,752,892
Southend-on-Sea	1,733,398

Stadium	Turnover £
Glasgow (Shawfield)	1,667,392
Birmingham (Perry Barr, old)	1,663,977
Sheffield (Owlerton)	1,526,712
Leeds (Elland Road)	1,526,303
Wolverhampton (Monmore)	1,346,299
Gloucester & Cheltenham	970,347
London (Hackney)	940,260
Yarmouth	924,764
Derby	912,433
Ramsgate	886,521
Portsmouth	872,621
Bristol (Eastville)	829,729
Newcastle (Gosforth)	621,531
Nottingham	565,828
Reading	531,223

Stadium	Turnover £
Poole	530,080
Milton Keynes	516,666
Middlesbrough	468,621
Ipswich	466,779
Hull (Old Craven Park)	438,720
Coventry	424,723
Cradley Heath	414,698
Rye House	359,551
Manchester (White City)	344,927
Henlow (Bedfordshire)	344,528
Leicester	343,122
Oxford	340,863
Swindon	306,970
Norton Canes	60,000
