= 1980 Irish Greyhound Derby =

- Venue: Shelbourne Park
- Location: Dublin
- End date: 26 July
- Total prize money: £22,500 (winner)

The 1980 Irish Greyhound Derby took place during June and July with the final being held at Shelbourne Park in Dublin on 26 July 1980.

The winner Suir Miller won £22,500 and was trained by Michael Barrett, owned and bred by Elizabeth Flood. The competition was sponsored by Carrolls.

== Final result ==
At Shelbourne, 26 July (over 525 yards):

Position	Winner	Breeding	Trap	SP	Time	Trainer
1st	Suir Miller	Minnesota Miller - More Cream	6	7-2	29.17	Michael Barrett
2nd	Another Trail	Shamrock Sailor - Cold Wind	1	6-1	29.43	James O'Connor
3rd	Nameless Pixie	Monalee Champion - Itsastar	2	5-1	29.48	Ger McKenna
4th	Hurry on Bran	Brave Bran - Hurry on Hostess	4	4-1	29.50	Eric Pateman
5th	Knockrour Slave	Sole Aim - Knockrour Exile	3	9-4f		Ger McKenna
6th	Hidden Shadow	Free Speech - Glen Eivers	5	6-1		Michael Leahy

=== Distances ===
3¼, ½, head (lengths)

== Competition Report ==
Indian Joe topped the ante-post list after his 1980 English Greyhound Derby win and Ger McKenna's Knockrour Slave and Nameless Pixie were considered major contenders. English derby finalist Fred Flinstone lined up for the event and English Derby runner-up Hurry on Bran would compete for England. Another English hound Dodford Bill was put with Jack Murphy for the competition.

The opening round featured many stars and Indian Joe recorded a very fast 28.98 win. Fred Flinstone and newcomer Suir Miller both sealed victories whilst Knockrour Slave had to settle for second place behind Flying Marble.

The second round saw Kilkenny track record holder Lax Law win in 28.94 and all the favourites progressed. The fancied runners continued to do well and eased through the quarter-finals safely resulting in some very strong semi-final heats.

The first semi was won by Knockrour Slave and he made the final by virtue of beating Suir Miller in 29.30. In the second decider Another Trail recorded 29.21 with Nameless Pixie making his second consecutive Irish Derby final in second place. The final semi was ended with Hurry On Bran beating Hidden Shadow in 29.13. Indian Joe, Fred Flinstone, Dodford Bill and Lax Law all crashed out.

Another Trail was first out of the traps in the final and by the third bend Knockrour Slave was on the tail of the leader. The pair came around the fourth bend together but were overtaken by the orange jacket of Suir Miller and he drew clear for an impressive win. His young trainer Michael Barrett had sealed his second Derby crown.

== See also ==
- 1980 UK & Ireland Greyhound Racing Year
