= Patricias Hope =

Racing greyhound (1970–1982)

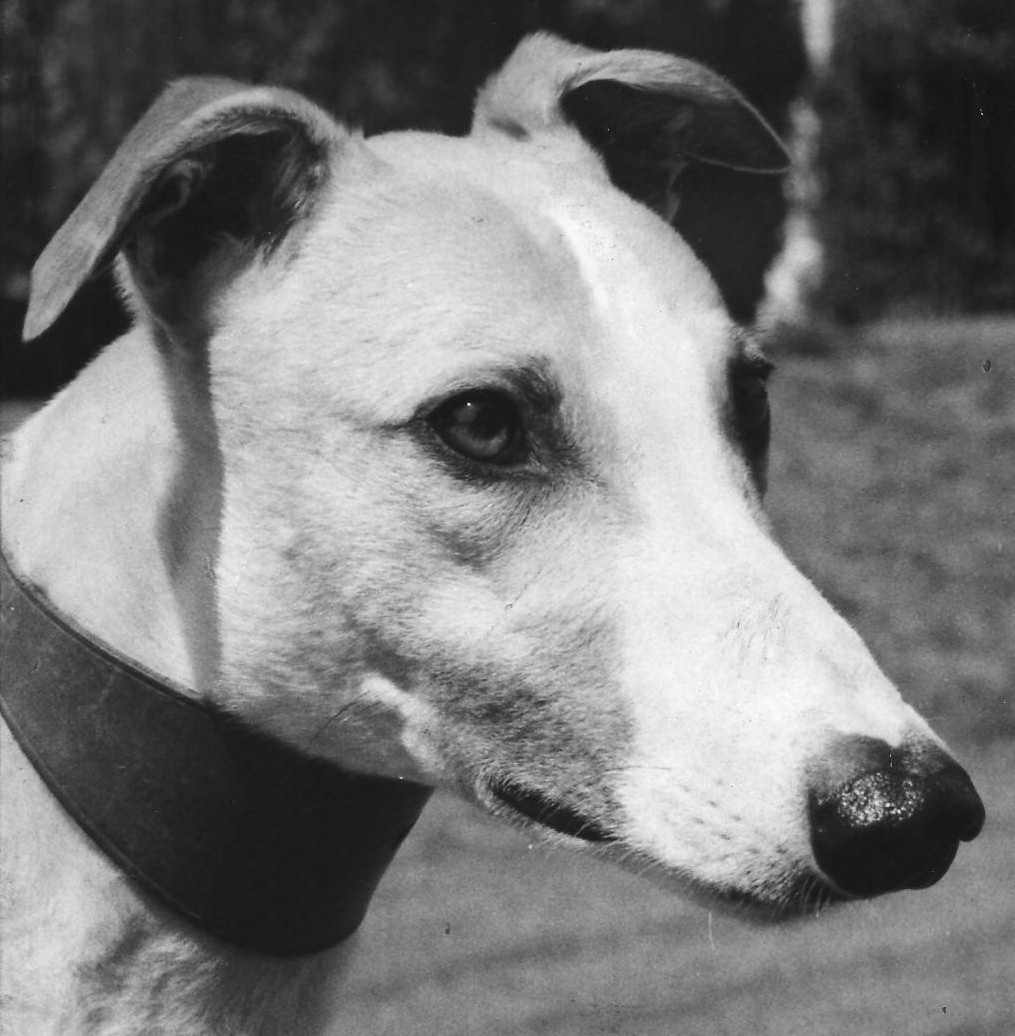
- Sire: Silver Hope
- Dam: Patsicia
- Sex: Dog
- Whelped: July 1970
- Died: November 1982
- Color: White and Fawn
- Owner: Gordon & Basil Marks; John O'Connor, Brian Stanley
- Trainer: Adam Jackson / John O'Connor

Record
- English Greyhound Derby x 2 Scottish Greyhound Derby; Welsh Greyhound Derby

Awards
- 1972 Greyhound of the Year

Patricias Hope was a famous racing greyhound from the 1970s. He is just one of four greyhounds along with Mick the Miller, Rapid Ranger and Westmead Hawk to win the English Greyhound Derby twice.

== 1972 ==
Patricias Hope won the 1972 English Greyhound Derby when trained by Adam Jackson and owned by Brian Stanley and Gordon and Basil Marks. During the same year he secured the Triple Crown, consisting of the English Greyhound Derby, Scottish Greyhound Derby and Welsh Greyhound Derby. Along with Trev's Perfection and Mile Bush Pride, only one of three greyhounds to do so and was duly voted 1972 Greyhound of the Year. He was later sent to stud.

== 1973 ==
In 1973 he returned from stud duties in Ireland (where he had covered some 36 bitches) and successfully defended his title when winning the 1973 English Greyhound Derby for trainer John O'Connor. He became only the second greyhound in history at the time, after Mick the Miller, to claim a second title. The event was broadcast live on ITV's World of Sport and won £12,500, under new sponsors Spillers. John O'Connor had bought Brian Stanley's share in the greyhound and trained him for the 1973 competition.

== 1974 ==
He was retired to stud in 1974 after failing to secure a record third English Derby.

== Retirement ==
In November 1982 at the age of 12 he was put to sleep at the Hook Estate and Kennels, after losing control of his hind legs.

== Pedigree ==
Solar Prince
Clonalvy Pride
Asmena
Silver Hope
The Grand Fire
Millie Hawthorn
Glittering Millie
Patricias Hope
Glittering Look
Odd Venture
Blarney Groves
Patsicia
Pigalle Wonder
Helena's Gossip
Sallys Dreamer
