= Kennomeat =

British dog food brand

Kennomeat was a popular brand of canned dog food sold in the United Kingdom.

== History ==
Robert Wilson & Sons were an established manufacturer of pet foods, with canneries in Barrhead near Glasgow and at Malone in Belfast, Northern Ireland, and in the 1930s they registered the names Kennomeat and Kattomeat.

These products for dogs and for cats were not launched until the 1950s, but soon took 20 per cent of the British pet food market.

== Popularity ==
Kennomeat was particularly popular in the 1960s due to a successful series of TV commercials which reversed the role of dogs and their masters.

The main dogs in these were named Albert and Sidney; Peter Sellers originated the voice of the former, and Peter Hawkins voiced the latter.

== Acquisition ==
In 1964, Spillers Ltd took over the brand names with its acquisition of Wilsons' subsidiary, Scottish Animal Products Ltd.

Kattomeat was renamed as Arthurs in 1992, but the Kennomeat brand has been dropped.

Spiller was acquired by Dalgety plc in 1979. The Spillers pet food business was sold to Nestlé in 1998, and the factory at Barrhead was closed in 2004.

== See also ==
- Pedigree Petfoods
