= 1968 Irish Greyhound Derby =

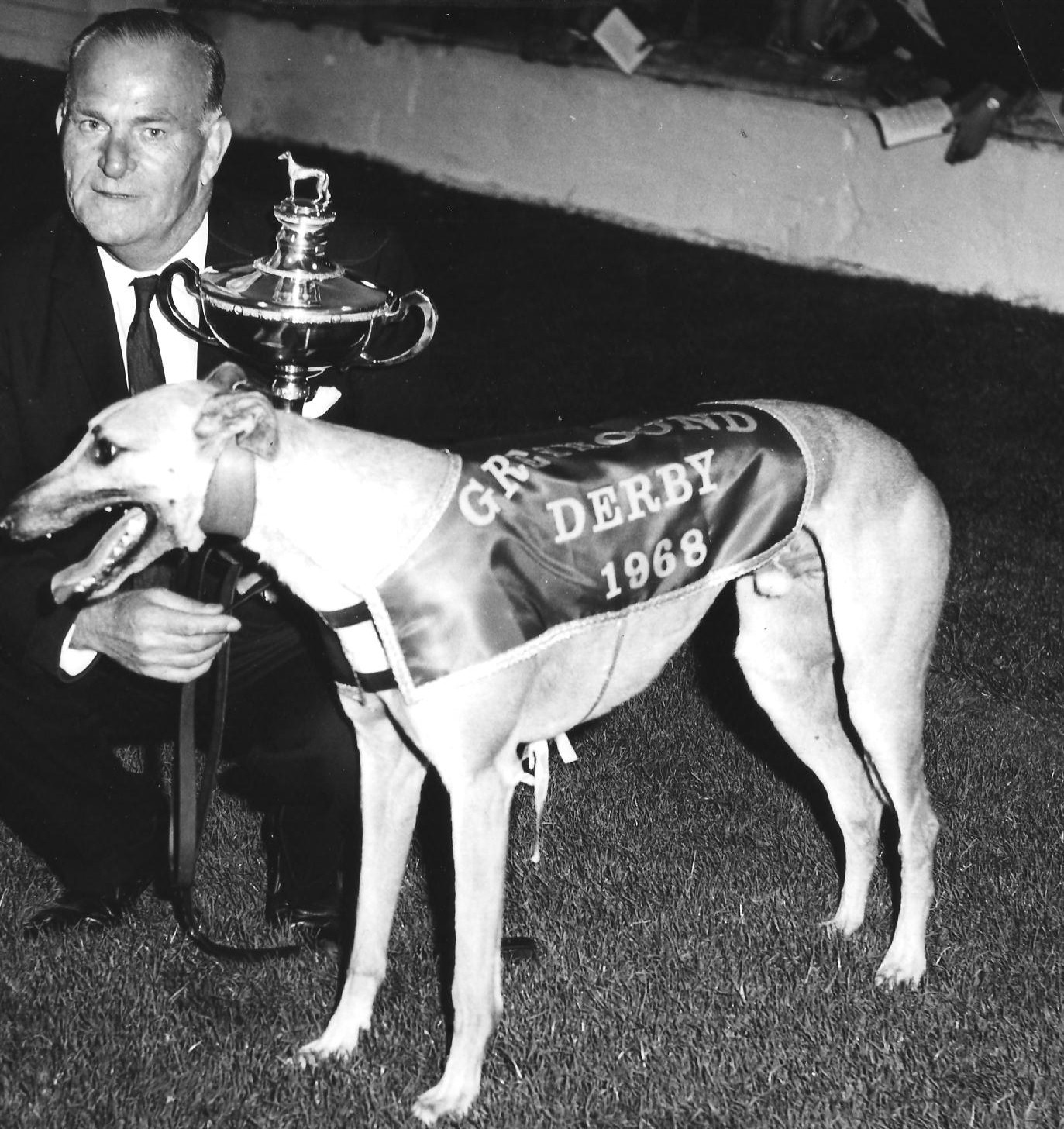
- Yellow Printer
- Venue: Shelbourne Park
- Location: Dublin
- End date: 10 August
- Total prize money: £2,000 (winner)

The 1968 Irish Greyhound Derby took place during July and August with the final being held at Shelbourne Park in Dublin on 10 August 1968.

In January 1968 Shelbourne Park came under the ownership of the Bord na gCon for £240,000, which resulted in Shelbourne becoming the permanent home of the Irish Greyhound Derby from 1970.

The winner Yellow Printer won £2,000 and was trained by John Bassett, owned by Miss Pauline Wallis and Sir Robert Adeane.

== Final result ==
At Shelbourne, 10 August (over 525 yards):

Position	Winner	Breeding	Trap	SP	Time	Trainer
1st	Yellow Printer	Printer's Prince - Yellow Streak	4	11-8f	29.11	John Bassett (England)
2nd	Russian Gun	Pigalle Wonder - Shandaroba	6	5-2	29.23	Tom Lynch
3rd	Drumna Chestnut	Bermuda's Cloud - Drumna Snowdrop	3	100-6	29.59	P McCusker
4th	Ballybeg Flash	Prairie Flash - Knock Late	5	100-7		J Brennan & J Clohessy
5th	Clinker Flash	Prairie Flash - Water Cress	1	50-1		M Carroll
6th	It's A Mint	Prairie Flash - Cranog Bet	2	5-2		Leslie McNair

=== Distances ===
1½, 4½ (lengths)

== Competition Report ==
The leading entry for the 1968 Derby was Yellow Printer, who was regarded as being the fastest greyhound in training for many years. He had reached the Easter Cup final beaten by It's A Mint before taking part in an eventful 1968 English Greyhound Derby. He was jointly owned by Pauline Wallis and Sir Robert Adeane and arrived in Ireland with trainer John Bassett and was housed at Gay McKenna's Kennels in Cabinteely. He was installed at an incredibly short ante-post price 5-2. He ran a solo trial recording a fast 29.40 just one day before the heats, and his odds were shortened further to an unprecedented even money favourite, extraordinary odds for a competition.

On 20 July Yellow Printer became the first greyhound to break 29 seconds over 525 yards at Shelbourne Park, when he won by nine lengths and clocked 28.83sec in a first round victory. Defending champion Russian Gun also won in an impressive 29.22 and Philotimo, the McAlinden Cup and Laurels champion posted 29.32. Other winners included It's A Mint, Mister Rubble and Puppy Derby champion Kalamazoo.

The second round proved eventful because It's A Mint went fastest in 29.29 but Yellow Printer and Russian Gun both remained unbeaten after the round.

Yellow Printer remained unbeaten as he wrapped up his semi-final in 29.43 from Ballybeg Flash; It's A Mint defeated Drumna Chestnut in the second decider and the remaining semi provided the punters with a superb fight back from Russian Gun when the black dog had looked in a hopeless position; he then came from nowhere to qualify behind Clinker Flash.

In the final Ballybeg Flash broke first out of the traps, but it was Yellow Printer from trap four who took the lead followed by Russian Gun, who stayed with him the whole way round and only conceded the race late on.

== See also ==
- 1968 UK & Ireland Greyhound Racing Year
