= John Honeysett =

British greyhound racing professional trainer (1938–2018)

Personal information
- Born: 15 June 1938 Bromley, England
- Died: 17 October 2018 (aged 80) Bromley, England
- Occupation: Greyhound Trainer

Sport
- Sport: Greyhound racing

Achievements and titles
- National finals: Major wins: UK trainers championship (1979); Pall Mall Stakes (1982); Select Stakes (1984, 1987); Golden Jacket (1978); Blue Riband (1981, 1984); Greenwich Cup (1978, 1995); Brighton Belle (1978); Sussex Cup (1978)

John Honeysett (15 June 1938 – 17 October 2018) was an English greyhound trainer. He was the UK trainers championship winner in 1979.

== Profile ==
Honeysett worked for Paddy Coughlan before obtaining his own private trainers license. In 1978 he joined Crayford & Bexleyheath Stadium as a contracted trainer. He was propelled to fame within the industry when winning the 1979 Trainers Championship.

In 1980 he steered Corduroy through to the final of the 1980 English Greyhound Derby and one year later Clohast Fame reached the 1981 English Greyhound Derby. During 1983 he switched from Crayford to join Wembley. He trained out of Pendene Farm and Kennels in Redhill, Surrey.

From 1986 - 1989 he handled four successive English Greyhound Derby finalists, Easy Prince, Stouke Whisper (twice) and Early Vocation. His owners included Patsy Byrne.

When Wembley was threatened by closure Honeysett joined Catford Stadium but retired from the sport in 1997.

== Awards ==
He won the 1979 Trainers Championship.
