= Crayford & Bexleyheath Stadium =

Sport stadium in London, England

- Interactive map of Crayford & Bexleyheath Stadium
- Location: Bexley, Greater London, England
- Coordinates: 51°26′57″N 0°10′38″E
- Surface: sand (originally peat)

Construction
- Opened: 1930
- Renovated: 1937
- Closed: 1985

Tenants
- Greyhound racing Crayford Kestrels

Crayford & Bexleyheath Stadium was a greyhound racing and motorcycle speedway stadium in the London Borough of Bexley.

== Origins and Opening ==
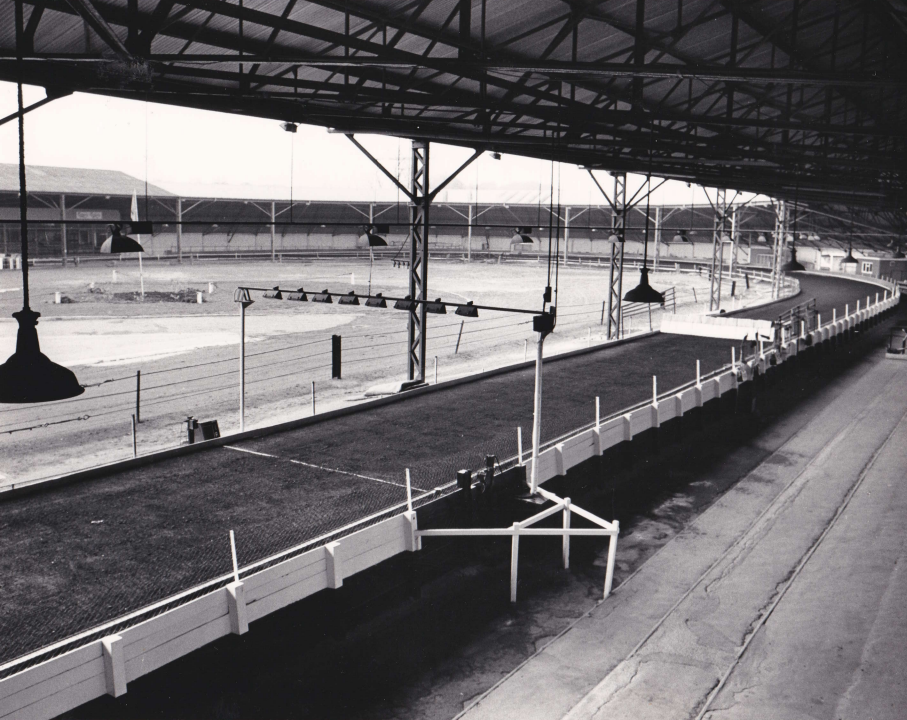
Crayford & Bexleyheath Greyhound Stadium c.1960

In 1930 the Bexleyheath and District Motorcycle Club started making plans for a grass speedway track on land known as the Crayford Fairfield that had hosted travelling fairs for a reported 500 years. The first speedway meeting was held in the spring of 1930 but the following season (1931) it was decided to postpone any further speedway meetings due to the work involved in organising them. A company called Wilson Greyhound Racing Track Ltd stepped in and built a 450-yard circuit around the grass track and racing duly opened on Easter Monday 1932. Speedway returned in 1932 with a new cinder track inside the dog track and it was known as the Crayford Speedway Stadium until 1937.

== Renovation ==
In 1937 builders W & C French undertook a huge rebuilding project for the Crayford & Bexleyheath Greyhound Stadium Ltd company costing £50,000. The project included a new greyhound track, two glass fronted grandstands and a restaurant all under cover but sadly for the speedway there was no provision made. The build came across a human skull believed to be over 300 years old when a workman was digging foundations for the greyhound kennels and this gained the attention of archaeologists.

The new opening was on 10 July 1937 with the distances created being 462, 650 and 880 yards and the running surface was a deep peat which would soon gain a reputation for being helpful to greyhounds with toe and foot ailments. There were some early problems and in particular the track suffered at the hands of dopers, two such events in 1941 and 1946 resulted in prison sentences for several individuals and the track was forced to employ a private security force.

== History ==
In 1955 Henry Parsons was employed by the track and trained all of the greyhounds racing there. In 1964 the ownership of the stadium changed from Northumbrian and Crayford Trust Ltd to the group known as the Totalisator Holdings Group (THG), owners of three other tracks at the time (Gosforth, Leeds and Brough Park). The company became the second biggest greyhound industry operator behind the Greyhound Racing Association (GRA). In 1967 the Crayford Vase was introduced as the tracks first major event. Also in 1967 a grandstand was constructed and a speedway circuit was added inside the greyhound track.

Crayford became the first track in the United Kingdom to adopt the United States system of employing contracted trainers instead of trainers being based in stadium kennels and being paid as direct employees of the track. Two of the four current trainers Bill Westcott and former Arms Park trainer Paddy Coughlan already trained from their own kennels. Terry O'Sullivan and Eric Parsons moved to other kennels in Kent. The new system left Henry Parsons with no kennels so he joined the racing office staff and John Honeysett and John Gibbons soon join the training ranks.

Ladbrokes bought THG in 1974 and Arthur Aldridge became racing director. Three years later the peat surface was replaced with sand and Tony Smith replaced Jim Simpson as Racing Manager in 1975.

== Speedway ==
The Crayford Kestrels were a Speedway team which operated from 1968 until their closure in 1983 when they transferred the promotion to Hackney. Initially nicknamed the 'Highwaymen' from 1968 until they closed in 1970, the track re-opened in 1975 and the team were nicknamed the Kestrels. The team were forced to relocate for the 1984 season as the stadium was sold for redevelopment. The Kestrels were National League Four-Team Champions in 1980.

== Closure ==
News emerged in 1984 that there were plans for a major redevelopment project by Ladbrokes. The twenty-acre site would be split, with 15 acres being sold to Sainsbury's and the remaining five acres being converted into a new greyhound track and sports stadium on the west side of the site. Racing ended on 18 May 1985 and work began on the new five-acre site with the new stadium named Crayford Stadium.

== Achievements ==
The Henry Parsons trained Malanna Mace won the 1952 Test and the Northern 700 and finished runner up in the St Leger final. The following year he won the Wembley Gold Cup. John Honeysett won the Trainers championship in 1979 after the event was hosted by the track. The Honeysett trained Corduroy reached the 1980 English Greyhound Derby final, a feat repeated by Honeysett the following year with Clohast Flame. Flying Pursuit trained by John Gibbons won the 1980 Laurels and Sugarville Pat claimed the Pall Mall Stakes in 1982, Flying Duke took the Grand Prix in 1983 and Amenhotep won the Laurels in 1984 for Linda Mullins.

== Competitions ==
=== Crayford Vase ===
The Crayford Vase was inaugurated at the track in 1967. It switched to the new stadium in 1987.
Past Winners (up until 1985)

Year	Winner	Breeding	Trainer	Time	SP
1967	Millies Valley	Pigalle Wonder – Racing Millie	Gordon Hodson (White City)	29.17	
1968	Ambiguous	Crazy Parachute – The Mistress	Paddy McEvoy (Wimbledon)	29.10	5-2
1969	Quarrymount Bill	Boro Parachute – Ballinasloe Judy	Frank Melville Harringay)	28.69	10-1
1970	Lord Phil	Lucky Wonder – Lachienne	Dennis Mansfield (Southend)	29.21	7-2
1971	Mad Risk	Carry On Oregon – Mad Girl	Charlie Coyle (Private)	28.77	4-1
1972	Fragrant Flyer	Prince of Roses – Forest Brown	Bill Westcott (Crayford & Bexleyheath)	28.41	11-10f
1973	Kilmac Chieftan	Own Pride – Stolen Tilly	Vernon Ford (Private)	28.58	5-4
1974	Money Again	Clomoney Jet – Leades Again	John Coleman (Wembley)	28.92	16-1
1975	London Spec	Spectre II – Hi Lasinagh	Pat Mullins (Ipswich)	28.41	5-4
1976	Gin And Jass	Kilbeg Kuda – Liberty Bell	Dave Drinkwater (Rye House)	28.54	9-4
1977	Colonel Pearloma	Lively Band – Certral	John Coleman (Wembley)	28.70	1-1f
1978	Proud Time	Time Up Please – Girvin Kate	John Gibbons (Private)	28.40	7-2
1979	Fearna Cobbler	Cobbler – Aidans Lady	John Sherry (Walthamstow)	28.38	5-2
1980	Johns Luck	Westmead Bounty – Kiltean Fawn	John Coleman (Wembley)	28.47	4-1
1981	Deel Joker	Free Speech – Leaping Lady	John Gibbons (Crayford & Bexleyheath)	28.11	4-6f
1982	General Fun	Laurdella Fun – Satin Sash	Terry Duggan (Romford)	29.02	7-1
1983	Sammy Bear (dead-heat)	Mexican Chief – Lady Laurdella	George Curtis (Brighton)	28.53	5-2jf
1983	Cashen Son (dead-heat)	Jimsun – Minty Lady	George Curtis (Brighton)	28.53	5-1
1984	Gortatlea Brigg	Noble Brigg – Lartigue Rose	Michael Gallagher (Rye House)	28.17	10-1

(1967–1984 held at Crayford & Bexleyheath over 490 yards/462 metres)

== Track records ==
=== Pre-Metric track records ===
Distance yards	Greyhound	Time	Date	Notes
440	Rovers Companion	26.02	1948	
490	Not Coming	29.00	1948	
490	Coming Captain	28.21	22.05.1964	
500	Hetton Ring	28.89	1948	
500	Ardine Glitter		30.05.1966	
500	Quarrymount Bill	28.69	1970	
500	Dolores Rocket		1971	
520	Rio Cavallero	30.16	1948	
520	Dim Forecast	29.88	22.05.1963	
530	Go the Bell	30.36	1948	
650	Lee Wind	38.92	30.12.1961	
700	Knocknagoun Pleasure	41.38	06.05.1964	
700	Shanes Pilot		1968	
700	Shanes Pilot		1968	
700	Mister Dash	40.71	12.1969	
700	Come On Wonder		1974	
940	Sams Bawnie	56.57	1970	
500 H	Ballintore Tiger	29.70	1970	
530 H	Cannuck's Wish	31.29	1948	

=== Post-Metric track records ===
Distance metres	Greyhound	Time	Date	Notes
240	Bray Vale	14.77	02.06.1980	
240	Travara Rock	14.76	26.08.1981	
462	Pigeon Flyer	28.04	14.08.1978	
462	House of Hope	27.78	23.11.1984	
648	Noble Brigg		1979	
648	Triple Aspect		24.03.1979	Trainers Championship meeting
648	Cormacrusier	40.26	31.03.1980	
648	Sundridge Bet	39.90	01.11.1982	
870	Salina	55.31	02.06.1980	
1056	Keem Princess	69.35	06.12.1980	
1056	Gala Special	67.68	07.11.1983	
462 H	London Rover	28.88	14.04.1980	
648 H	Howl On Roger	41.45	28.03.1979	
