= Yellow Printer =

Famous racing dog

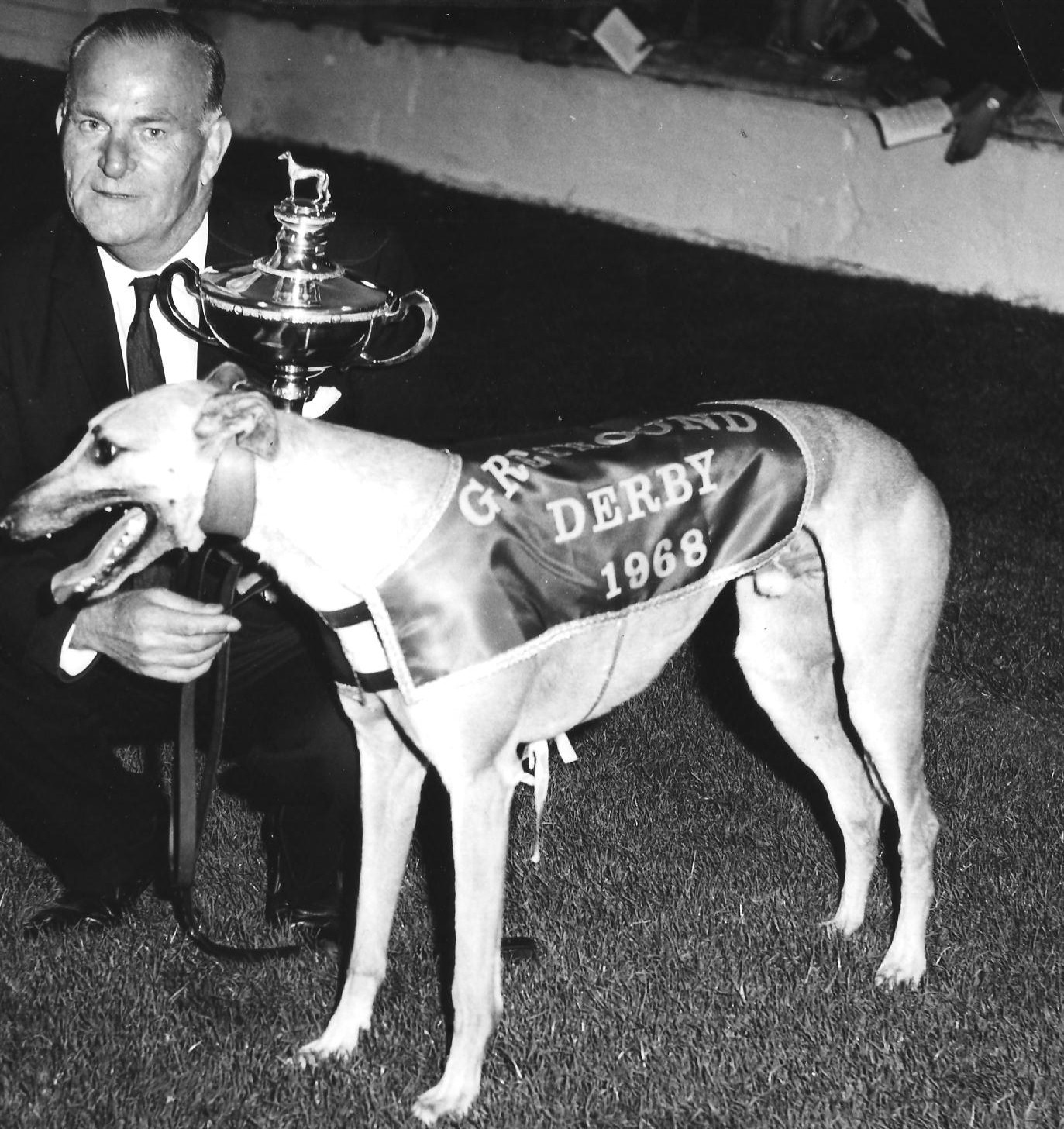
- Yellow Printer with John Bassett
- Sire: Printer's Prince
- Dam: Yellow Streak
- Sex: Dog
- Whelped: March 1966
- Died: 1978 (aged 12)
- Color: Red Fawn
- Owner: Miss Pauline Wallis and Sir Robert Adeane
- Trainer: John Bassett; Paddy Milligan

Major wins
- Wood Lane Stakes; Wembley Summer Cup

Other awards
- Greyhound of the Year

Honours
- 1968 Irish Greyhound Derby champion

Yellow Printer was a famous racing greyhound during the late 1960s. He is regarded as being one of the fastest racing greyhounds in history and won Ireland's ultimate prize, the Irish Greyhound Derby, in addition to being voted the 1968 UK Greyhound of the Year.

== Mating and rearing ==
He was whelped in March 1966, from a mating between Printer's Prince and Yellow Streak.

== Racing ==
=== 1967 ===
After losing in the final of the Ulster St Leger Paddy Keane paid a four figure sum to buy Yellow Printer. He was later bought by Miss Pauline Wallis (a night club proprietor) and Sir Robert Adeane and placed with trainer John Bassett at Clapton.

=== 1968 ===
After competing in the Easter Cup at Shelbourne Park, he won the Wood Lane Stakes at White City. Then on 3 June 1968 he recorded a new Word Record of 28.30 seconds for 525 yards, during the 1968 English Greyhound Derby qualifying heats at White City. This led him to starting the main event as the shortest ante-post favorite of all time at 6–4. After a bunched first round race he qualified in third place and betting was suspended while he received a veterinary check. He passed the check but a few days later was knocked over in the second round and was eliminated from the competition.

After winning the Wembley Summer Cup, he traveled to Ireland with John Bassett and was housed at Gay McKenna's kennels in Cabinteely in preparation for the 1968 Irish Greyhound Derby. On 20 July, he became the first greyhound to break 29 seconds over 525 yards at Shelbourne Park, when he won by nine lengths and clocked 28.83 in a first round victory. He went on to win the final in 29.11, the fastest ever final win at the time.

On his return to England the greyhound was placed in the care of trainer Paddy Milligan by his owners because they had been upset by the decision of the Greyhound Racing Association to move the Clapton trainers (of which Bassett was one) from Claverhambury Farm into the Hook Estate and Kennels.

In the Pall Mall Stakes at Harringay Stadium during November, he won his heat in 28.71 (a new track record), which he lowered to 28.60 in the semi-final but lost the final to Local Motive, who he had beaten in the semi. He represented England in the International at Limerick on 30 November but was beaten by Flaming King trained by Tony Quigley. Yellow Printer's owner Pauline Wallis reacted by buying Flaming King for £5,000 from Frank Moran and taking him back to England. Yellow Printer was voted 1968 Greyhound of the Year.

=== 1969 ===
Yellow Printer won the Sir Billy Butlin Stakes at White City, recording the second fastest ever time there in 28.38 seconds. He made a second attempt at the English Derby but despite being ante-post favourite again was knocked out of the event in round two. The heat contained Sand Star (the eventual winner), Kilbelin Style (the runner-up) and Pallas Joy (who won the Welsh Greyhound Derby) the following month.

He was then retired to stud in Ireland. After only a short period at stud in Ireland he became an influential sire in the United States, after joining his owner Pauline O'Donnell (née Wallis) there.

== Legacy ==
Many consider Yellow Printer to be the fastest dog ever to raced but he was not suited to the bends of greyhound tracks. Yellow Printer spent his later years as a pet in the O'Donnell household where he lived until he died in 1978, aged 12.

== Pedigree ==
Slaney Record
Hi There
Dublin Red
Printer's Prince
Endless Gossip
Sally's Gossip
Castle Yard
Yellow Printer
Glittering Look
Odd Venture
Blarney Groves
Yellow Streak
The Grand Fire
Shane's Judy
Racing Bay
