= 1980 English Greyhound Derby =

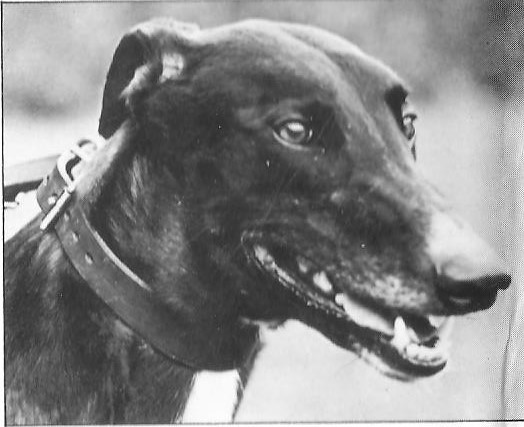
- Indian Joe
- Location: White City Stadium
- End date: 28 June
- Total prize money: £35,000

The 1980 Spillers Greyhound Derby took place during June with the final being held on 28 June 1980 at White City Stadium. The winner was Indian Joe and the winning owner Alfie McLean (a bookmaker) received £35,000. The competition was sponsored by the Spillers.

== Final result ==
At White City (over 500 metres):

Position	Name of Greyhound	Breeding	Trap	SP	Time	Trainer
1st	Indian Joe	Brave Bran - Minnatonka	6	13-8jf	29.68	John Hayes (Ireland)
2nd	Hurry On Bran	Brave Bran - Hurry On Hostess	5	13-8jf	29.74	Eric Pateman (Wimbledon)
3rd	Young Breeze	Sage - Scorduff Breeze	1	7-2	29.82	Jack Coker (Oxford)
4th	Fred Flinstone	Itsamiller - Lighthouse Bid	2	7-1	29.88	Matt O'Donnell (Ireland)
5th	Corduroy	Itsachampion - Cavity Block	3	14-1	30.00	John Honeysett (Crayford)
6th	Iskagh Ruler	Dark Ruler - Bride To Be	4	20-1	30.02	Barbara Tompkins (Coventry)

=== Distances ===
¾, 1, ¾, 1½, head (lengths)
The distances between the greyhounds are in finishing order and shown in lengths. One length is equal to 0.08 of one second.

== Competition Report ==
The 50th anniversary of the competition was marked by the first prize being increased to £35,000 and the event reverted to the previous format where all of the rounds would take place at White City Stadium. There were many entries from Ireland including the Ger McKenna trained Irish Laurels champion and ante-post favourite Knockrour Slave. Other leading Irish entries were the John Hayes trained Irish Greyhound Derby finalist Indian Joe and Matt O’Donnell's Fred Flintstone. The 1979 finalist Desert Pilot was the leading British entry.

Indian Joe set a very fast time in round one after recording 29.19 (just three spots slower than the track record) justifying the record £25,000 that his new owner Belfast bookmaker Alfie McLean had paid for him. In a later heat Knockrour Slave recorded 29.23 but Dangerous Lad and Desert Pilot were eliminated. After the second round had been completed Knockrour Slave and the English bred Dodford Bill remained unbeaten but Indian Joe only qualified third from his heat.

Uneventful quarter-finals were followed by the first semi-final which saw Old Bolshie being withdrawn leaving Hurry on Bran to win from Corduroy and Indian Joe who had struggled once again but claimed the all-important third place. Young Breeze was a shock winner of the second semi winning from Fred Flinstone and Iskagh Ruler; Knockrour Slave and Dodford Bill both went out after encountering trouble.

In the final Indian Joe broke well sitting just behind Corduroy but Fred Flinstone soon took the lead with Indian Joe pursuing. Coming out of the second bend Indian Joe took a decisive lead and held off the fast finishing Hurry on Bran to take the trophy back to Ireland.

== See also ==
- 1980 UK & Ireland Greyhound Racing Year
