= Winalot =

Brand of dog food

Winalot is a popular brand of dog food sold in the United Kingdom and Ireland, founded in 1927.

The name was first used in 1927 for dog biscuits by Spillers Ltd; they were initially marketed as a food for racing greyhounds, but soon gained popularity with domestic canines and became a brand leader in the 1930s.

== History ==
The Spillers business was acquired by Nestlé in 1998, after which the Winalot brand was expanded to include a broader range of dry foods, canned products, and dog treats.

Winalot is currently marketed by Nestlé Purina PetCare, and is the UK's second biggest-selling dog food brand. Their products have recently been subject to a packaging change, to modernize and refresh the brand in 2016.

In 1988, composer Christopher Gunning wrote the music for a Winalot Prime television commercial. He later developed the piece into "The Long March", which was recorded and released as a charity single by the Barking Light Orchestra.
