= Johnny O'Connor (hurler) =

Irish hurler

Personal information
- Native name: Seán Ó Conchubhair (Irish)
- Born: 1928 Abbeyside, County Waterford, Ireland
- Died: 31 October 2010 (aged 82) Mallow, County Cork, Ireland
- Occupation: Primary school teacher
- Height: 5 ft 8 in (173 cm)

Sport
- Sport: Hurling
- Position: Midfield
Clubs
- Years: Club
- Abbeyside; Clonea; UCD; Castletownroche; Avondhu
College
- Years: College
- University College Dublin
College titles
- Fitzgibbon titles: 1
Inter-county
- Years: County
- 1946–1958: Waterford
Inter-county titles
- Munster titles: 2
- All-Irelands: 1
- NHL: 0

John P. O'Connor (1928 – 31 October 2010), known as Johnny O'Connor, was an Irish hurler who played as a midfielder for the Waterford senior team.

Born in Abbeyside, County Waterford, O'Connor first played competitive hurling during his schooling at Dungarvan CBS. He arrived on the inter-county scene when he first linked up with the Waterford minor team. He made his senior debut during the 1946–47 league. O'Connor subsequently became a regular member of the starting fifteen and won one All-Ireland medal and two Munster medals. He was an All-Ireland runner-up on one occasion.

As a member of the Munster inter-provincial on a number of occasions O'Connor won one Railway Cup medal. At club level he won several championship medals playing with Abbeyside, Clonea, UCD, Castletownroche and Avondhu.

O'Connor retired from inter-county hurling following the conclusion of the 1958 championship.

== Playing career ==
=== Colleges ===
During his schooling at Dungarvan CBS, O'Connor first established himself as a hurler of note. In spite of a lack of success in the Harty Cup, he was picked on the Munster colleges inter-provincial team, claiming winners' medals in 1945 and 1946.

=== University ===
As a mature student at University College Dublin in the mid-1950s, O'Connor was an automatic inclusion on the college hurling team. In 1958 he was at midfield as UCD faced University College Galway in the final of the inter-varsities championship. A huge 7–9 to 2–1 victory gave O'Connor a Fitzgibbon Cup medal.

=== Club ===
O'Connor first enjoyed club success in Dublin as a member of the University College Dublin team. In 1948 he won a championship medal as UCD won the decider for the second year in succession.

Two years later O'Connor was back in Waterford, playing with the Abbeyside team that reached the final of the junior championship. A 2–4 to 1–3 defeat of Dunhill gave him a championship medal in that grade.

By 1952 O'Connor was lining out with the Clonea team. That year he played in the Waterford senior decider, with T. F. Meagher's providing the opposition. A 1–10 to 2–1 victory gave O'Connor a championship medal once again.

A decade later and O'Connor, after settling in Cork, was lining out with Castletownroche. A 4–11 to 3–6 defeat of Youghal gave O'Connor yet another championship medal.

In the twilight of his club career, O'Connor's performances for Castletownroche earned him a place on the Avondhu divisional team. In 1966 a unique championship decider pitted Avondhu against University College Cork. A 2–11 to 4–4 victory secured yet another championship medal for O'Connor.

=== Inter-county ===
O'Connor made his senior debut for Waterford on 3 November 1946 in a 2–3 to 3–5 defeat by Kilkenny in the opening round of the National Hurling League. He was still a secondary school student at the time.

A year later on 29 June 1947, O'Connor made his championship debut in a 3–10 to 1–5 Munster semi-final defeat by Cork.

In 1948 Waterford lined out in their first provincial decider in five years, with reigning champions Cork providing the opposition.

After falling behind by five points early in the game, Waterford fought back to lead by a point at the interval. Goalkeeper Charlie Ware made some great saves while O'Connor stymied Cork's chief scorer Christy Ring to secure a 4–7 to 3–9 victory. It was O'Connor's first Munster medal. The subsequent All-Ireland final on 5 September 1948 pitted Waterford against Dublin. O'Connor's side started well and took a commanding 2–5 to 0–2 lead at the interval. Dublin rallied in the second half, however, Waterford quickly regained the upper-hand and powered to a 6–7 to 4–2 victory. Playing at centre-forward John Keane gave a masterclass, scoring three goals and two points and made most of the other scores. The victory gave O'Connor an All-Ireland medal.

After the long-awaited breakthrough at All-Ireland level, Waterford went into decline for almost a decade as Tipperary and Cork went on to dominate the provincial and All-Ireland series.

In 1957 Waterford broke back with O'Connor remaining as one of the veterans from the last glorious period. A 1–11 to 1–6 defeat of reigning provincial champions Cork gave O'Connor a second Munster medal. On 1 September 1957 Waterford lined out in the All-Ireland decider with Kilkenny providing the opposition. Over 70,000 spectators turned up at Croke Park to see an exciting game of hurling. With fifteen minutes left in the game Waterford led by six points. Two quick goals for "the Cats", together with a great point by captain Mickey Kelly reversed the trend and gave Kilkenny a 4–10 to 3–12 victory.

O'Connor retired from inter-county hurling following Waterford's exit from the 1958 championship.

=== Inter-provincial ===
O'Connor first lined out for Munster in the inter-provincial series in 1954. He was an unused substitute throughout the campaign, as Munster were eventually bested by Leinster in the decider.

The following year O'Connor, after playing in the opening game, was dropped from the starting fifteen for the decider. A 6–8 to 3–4 defeat of Connacht gave him his first Railway Cup medal, albeit as a non-playing substitute.

Defeat was Munster's lot again in 1956, however, O'Connor was a member of the starting fifteen for the decider the following year. A 6–6 to 0–10 defeat of Connacht gave him a second Railway Cup medal, his first on the field of play.

== Personal life ==
Born in Abbeyside, County Waterford, O'Connor was educated at the local national school before later attending Dungarvan CBS. After completing his Leaving Certificate in 1947, he studied to be a national school teacher at St. Patrick's College in Dublin.

His first teaching post was at Coláiste na Rinne in An Rinn, before later working for a while in the neighbouring An Sean Phobal. After a period spent in Canada, O'Connor returned to Ireland in 1959 where he took up the position of headmaster of the national school in Killavullen, County Cork.

He was a greyhound trainer after his hurling career and won the prestigious 1973 English Greyhound Derby with a greyhound called Patricias Hope.

== Honours ==
=== Team ===
Dungarvan CBS

- All-Ireland Colleges Interprovincial Hurling Championship (2): 1945, 1946

Abbeyside

- Waterford Junior Hurling Championship (1): 1950

University College Dublin

- Dublin Senior Hurling Championship (1): 1948
- Fitzgibbon Cup (1): 1958

Clonea

- Waterford Senior Hurling Championship (1): 1952

Castletownroche

- Cork Intermediate Hurling Championship (1): 1964

Avondhu

- Cork Senior Hurling Championship (1): 1966

Waterford

- All-Ireland Senior Hurling Championship (1): 1948
- Munster Senior Hurling Championship (2): 1948, 1957

Munster

- Railway Cup (2): 1955 (sub), 1957
