= Eastville Stadium =

Former greyhound racing and football venue in England

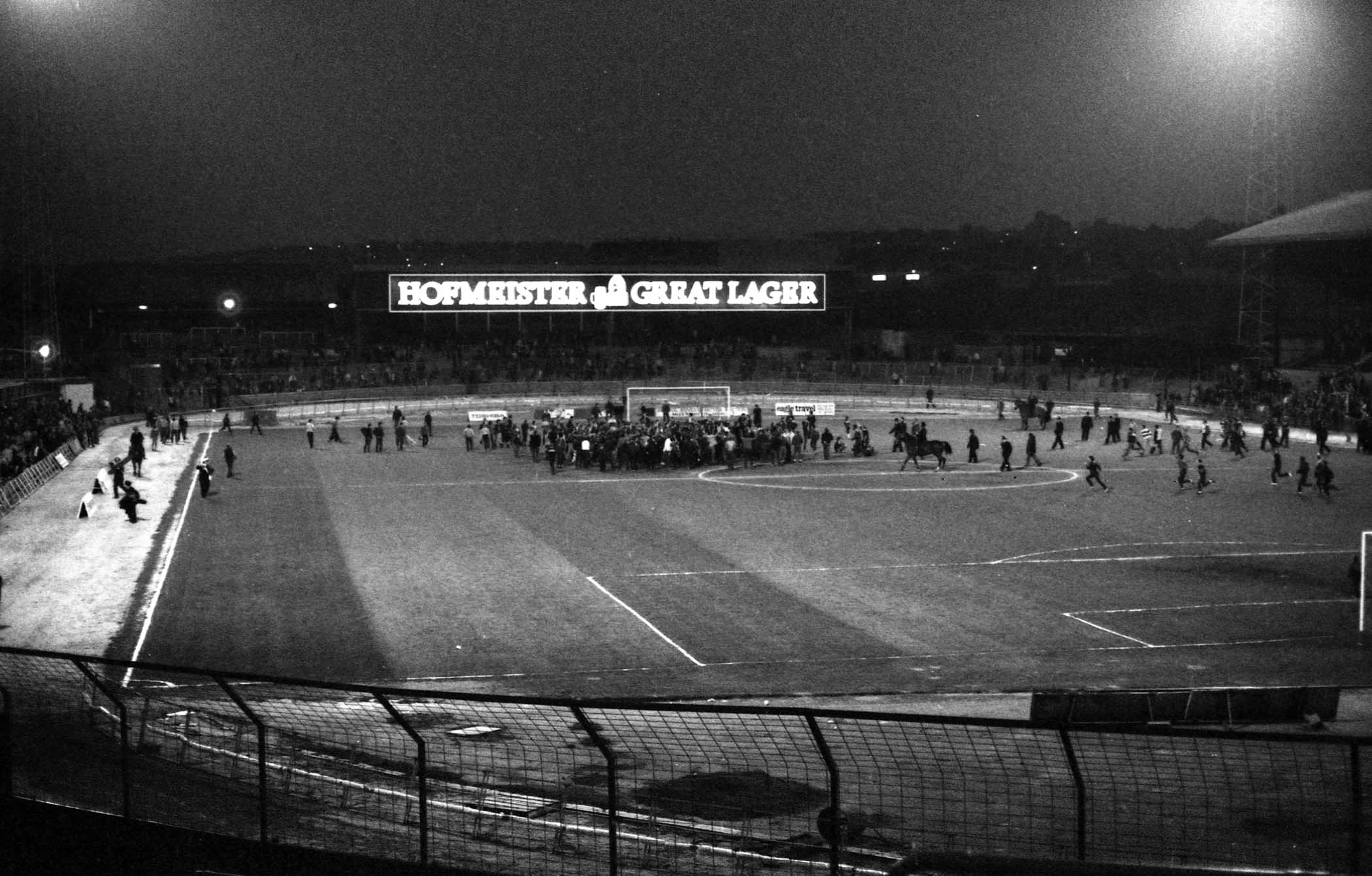
- Eastville Stadium in 1986
- Interactive map of the Eastville Stadium area

General information
- Location: Bristol, England
- Coordinates: 51.4725°N 2.5635°W
- Completed: 1897
- Demolished: 1998
- Client: Bristol Rovers F.C.

Map showing the former location of Eastville Stadium

Eastville Stadium, also known as Bristol Stadium and Bristol Stadium – Eastville, was a stadium in Eastville, a northern suburb of the English city of Bristol.

Constructed in 1897, it was the home of Bristol Rovers F.C., the Bristol Bulldogs speedway team and was also a greyhound racing venue. During 1986 it was also the home of the short-lived Bristol Bombers American football team.

== Football ==
=== History ===
Rovers played their home games at Eastville (nicknamed "The Ville") until forced to leave by financial difficulties in 1986. Rovers then spent a decade at Twerton Park in Bath before returning to the city to play at the Memorial Stadium where they remain to this day. The record attendance was 39,462.

Bristol Rovers have never played in the top flight of English football. The highest level of football which Eastville Stadium hosted was in the Football League Second Division.

Built near to a gas holder, the constant smell of town gas in the air gave rise to the name used for Bristol Rovers fans of "The Gas" or "Gasheads". The nickname "The Gas" began as a derogatory nickname used by Bristol City fans, however Rovers fans now refer to themselves as Gasheads as a badge of honour. The number 12 squad shirt has been officially allocated to "Gasheads" by the club in honour of the crowd being the 12th man.

Another unique feature of Eastville was the flower beds behind each goal.

=== Tote End ===
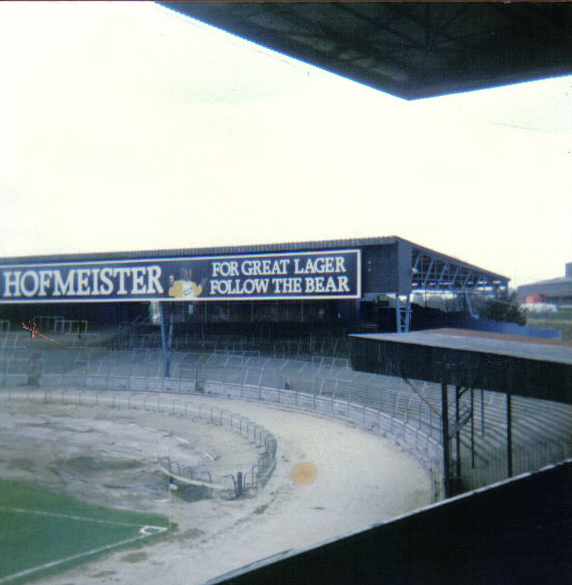
The Tote End in 1986

The Tote End or simply the Tote was a large section of covered terracing behind one of the goals. Originally built in 1935, the Tote End terrace was built following the curve of the greyhound racing track. It had a small covered section in the South-West corner.

The Totaliser clocks mounted first on the back of the terrace and then after a larger roof was added in 1961 to cover most of the terrace, on the roof fascia, gave it its name.

With a boisterous and intimidating atmosphere, largely due to it being a favoured spot for the more vociferous Rovers supporters, and given the nature of football in Britain in the 1970s, it became notoriously linked with bovver boys and hooliganism – a period documented by the book Bovver by Chris Brown.

Shortly after Rovers left Eastville in 1986, the Tote End was bulldozed.

== Speedway ==
In 1977 the Newport Wasps speedway team relocated to Bristol as the Bristol Bulldogs and remarkably the speedway track was placed on top of the greyhound circuit and then dug up again every meeting. The speedway only ran for two seasons in the British League before the team withdrew, and speedway has never been run in the city since.

== Greyhound racing ==
=== Opening ===
Racing started on Saturday 16 June 1928 becoming the second track in Bristol to open after Knowle Stadium. The first ever winner was a greyhound called Vivacious who collected £20 for his connections.

=== History ===
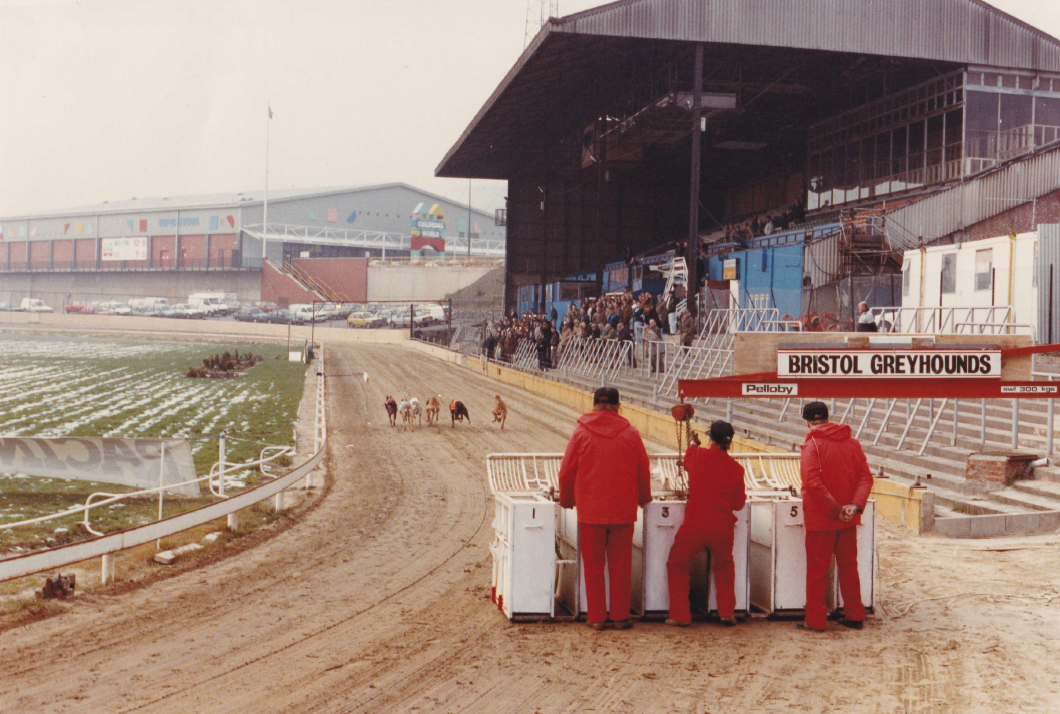
Winter racing at Eastville Stadium, Bristol c.1987

The totalisator system was introduced in 1932 securing the future of the stadium, this was in contrast to the football club who were in financial difficulties. During 1939 Bristol Rovers F.C negotiated a sale price to the Bristol Greyhound Company, albeit by the chairman, who carried out the deal without the knowledge of his fellow directors. Eastville changed hands for £12,000 and the first General Manager was Lieutenant-Colonel Forsdike who was to become secretary of the National Greyhound Racing Club.

The Golden Crest competition was introduced in 1937 and became one of the most important races in the provincial calendar. In 1945 Shannon Shore recorded an impressive win by ten lengths in a new track record for 500 yards; the black dog was timed at 28.76secs during the Golden Crest final. A second major competition was introduced in 1946 and this was the Western Two Year Old Produce Stakes.

In 1947 Oxford Stadium owner Leslie Calcutt was appointed as Director of Bristol Greyhound Racing Association Ltd, a move that would eventually result in Bristol taking over Oxford. The company also acquired Abbey Stadium in Swindon in 1952 and would be known as Bristol Stadium Ltd following the death of Leslie Calcutt.

Eastville became one of the first circuits to abandon grass in 1968, becoming sand based, many tracks would follow suit over the next decade. After selling Oxford Stadium to the council Ian Stevens became General Manager at Eastville in 1975 and in 1980 the track became one of eight tracks to be awarded Bookmakers Afternoon Greyhound Service (BAGS) contracts resulting in a steady income stream. The track suffered a serious fire in August 1980 with the majority of the south stand destroyed causing more than £1 million worth of damage. As a result of the fire the track closed for two months for repairs to be made.

When trainer Henry Kibble retired his son Terry took over the kennels and provided Eastville with its first English Greyhound Derby finalist in 1991 with Dempsey Duke. The greyhound also won the Blue Riband, East Anglian Derby and Reading Masters.

=== Closure ===
The company now known as the BS Group sold Eastville for development, plans were announced for a new Bristol greyhound stadium but never came to fruition. The stadium closed on 27 October 1997 with the entire greyhound operation moving to sister track Swindon. The site became an IKEA superstore.

=== Competitions ===
- Western Two Year Old Produce Stakes
- Golden Crest

=== Track records ===
Pre-metric

Distance yards	Greyhound	Time (sec)	Date	Notes
500	Shannon Shore	28.76	1945	Golden Crest final
500	Shannon Shore	28.66	1946	Golden Crest semi-final
500	Rimmells Black	28.65	13 August 1947	Golden Crest semi-final
500	Flintfield Grosvenor	28.50	1950	
500	Kensington Perfection	28.29	3 August 1953	Western Produce Stakes final
500	Discretions	27.85	1968	
525	Wise Carey	29.95	15 June 1938	
525	Roeside Scottie	29.94	27 August 1938	Golden Crest heats
525	Glen Ranger	29.69	27 August 1938	Golden Crest heats
525	Glen Ranger	29.64	3 September 1938	Golden Crest semi finals
525	Fealeside Bridge	29.39	15 September 1962	
525	Paddles Son		26 June 1965	
525	Moonlight Chase		23 April 1966	
600	Model Dasher	35.11	1950	
700	Shaggy Lass	40.61	10 June 1946	
730	Je Vendral	42.30	1970	
730	Peasedown Marvel	42.30	1970	=track record
730	Nobodys Pick	42.29	1972	
745	Watch Kern	42.74	11 July 1962	
932	Hops Pal	54.80	1972	
957	Ramsfort Venture	56.58	19 September 1964	
500 H	Red Nuxer	29.21	21 April 1945	
525 H	Paddles Son	30.48	26 June 1965	

Post-metric

Distance metres	Greyhound	Time (sec)	Date	Notes
266	Damiens Slave	16.30	29 November 1986	
266	Rapid Mover	16.26	1988	
270	Wheres The Limo	16.24	19 February 1992	
410	Fizzy Stuff	25.80	1988	
460	Peasedown Dollar	28.67	13 April 1991	
460	Wolf Man	27.82	11 June 1994	
470	Rolstone Silk	28.05	25 October 1979	
470	Mollifrend Slave	28.66	4 May 1991	
470	Manorland	28.49	4 May 1991	
610	Proud Operator	39.33	1988	
610	Among the Gold	39.19	1989	
620	Airmount Flash	38.29	15 February 1993	
665	First Name Bart	41.30	25 September 1993	
670	Rolstone Silk	41.39	18 June 1981	
680	Ice Cool Blonde	42.75	11 May 1991	
680	Fawn Peral	42.28	15 June 1991	
855	Decoy Lynx	53.72	13 August 1994	
874	Keem Princess	54.59	16 August 1980	
874	Lilac Wonder	54.54	17 August 1991	
1015	Mossfield Scotty	66.29	15 October 1992	
470 H	Sharp Look Out	29.53	1988	
470 H	Faoides Country	29.08	20 July 1991	

== Important dates ==
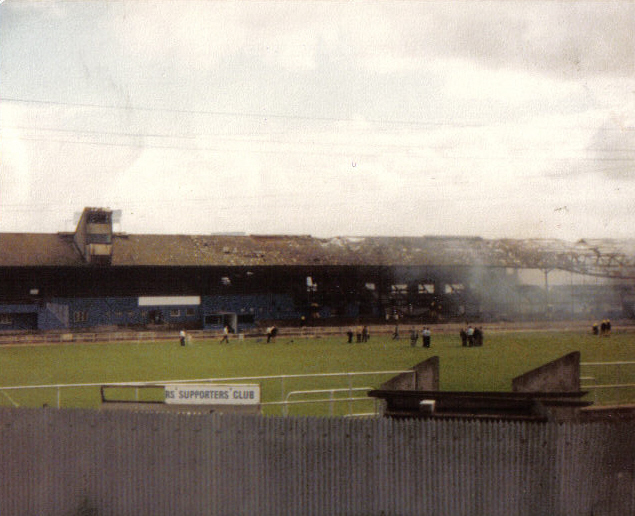
The aftermath of the fire in the South Stand, August 1980

- 1897 – Bristol Rovers first appearance at Eastville
- 1921 – Bristol Rovers purchase the stadium.
- 1924 – The mostly wooden south stand was built.
- 1935 – The Tote End was constructed.
- 1940 – The stadium is sold to the Bristol Greyhound Company.
- 1952 – First Commentary Broadcast to the Bristol Hospitals by the Bristol Hospital Broadcasting Service. 23 August v Shrewsbury Town: Rovers won 2–1.
- 1959 – The North Stand opened, and floodlights installed.
- 1960 – Highest recorded attendance for a Rovers match. 38,472 v Preston North End in the FA Cup 4th Round, 30 January.
- 1961 – A roof and new terracing installed at the Tote End.
- 1969 – M32 motorway opened.
- 1977 – Motorcycle speedway introduced to the ground.
- 1980 – South Stand fire in August.
- 1986 – Bristol Rovers play their last game at Eastville.
- 1997 – Last Greyhound meeting
- 1998 – Eastville stadium demolished.
