= Poole Stadium =

Venue and speedway track in Dorset, England

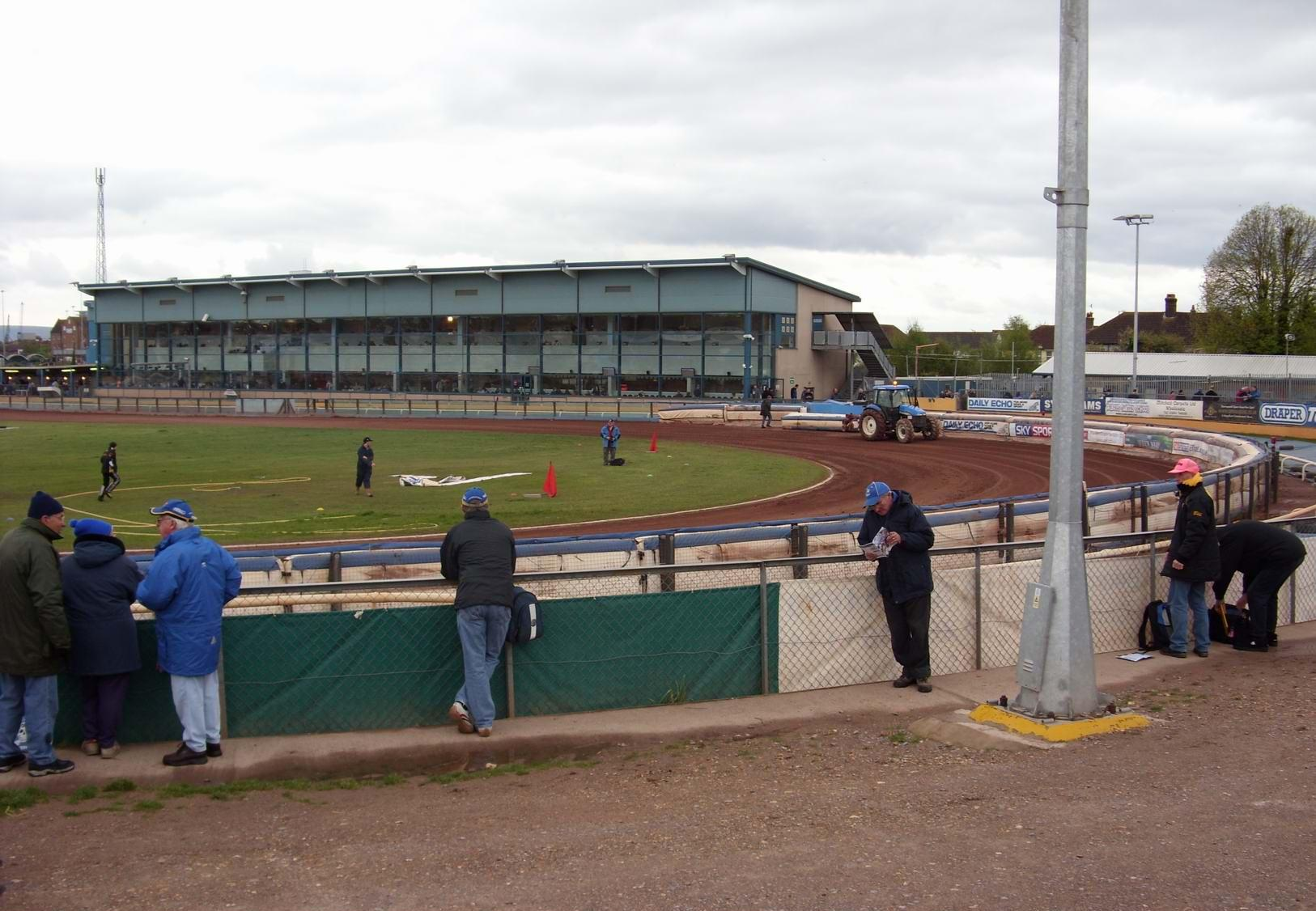
- The stadium's glass fronted grandstand and speedway track
- Interactive map of Poole Stadium
- Location: Wimborne Road, Poole, Dorset, BH15 2BP
- Coordinates: 50.722905°N 1.982010°W

Tenant
- Poole Pirates

Website
- poolegreyhounds.com

Poole Stadium is a speedway and former greyhound racing venue located in the town centre of Poole, Dorset in England. The stadium is owned by the Borough of Poole. It was built in the early 1930s in an attempt to provide a source of entertainment to the residents of Poole during the Great Depression. It is also often referred to as Wimborne Road, which is a road that runs adjacent to the stadium. During weekdays, the stadium's large car park is used to provide parking for Poole Hospital's park and ride scheme. On 22 September 2020 the permanent closure of greyhound racing at the site was announced.

== Football ==
In 1933 local semi-professional football team Poole Town moved to Poole Stadium where they began to play their home games in the Western Football League. In the 1946/47 season they had a run in the qualifying rounds of the FA Cup which took them through to a first round match against Queens Park Rangers. Poole drew 2–2 at Loftus Road but lost 6–0 in the replay in front of a then record attendance of 10,224. They again reached the first round in the 1962/63 season and held Watford to a 2–2 draw at Vicarage Road, but lost the replay at Poole Stadium in front of an 11,155 crowd.

Poole Town were based at the stadium for 61 years until Poole Council forced them to leave in 1994, citing low attendances. During their stay at the stadium, the club had financed improvements to the stadium such as a 1,100 seater grandstand on the east side of the football pitch built in 1960, and covered terracing on the west side.

== Speedway ==
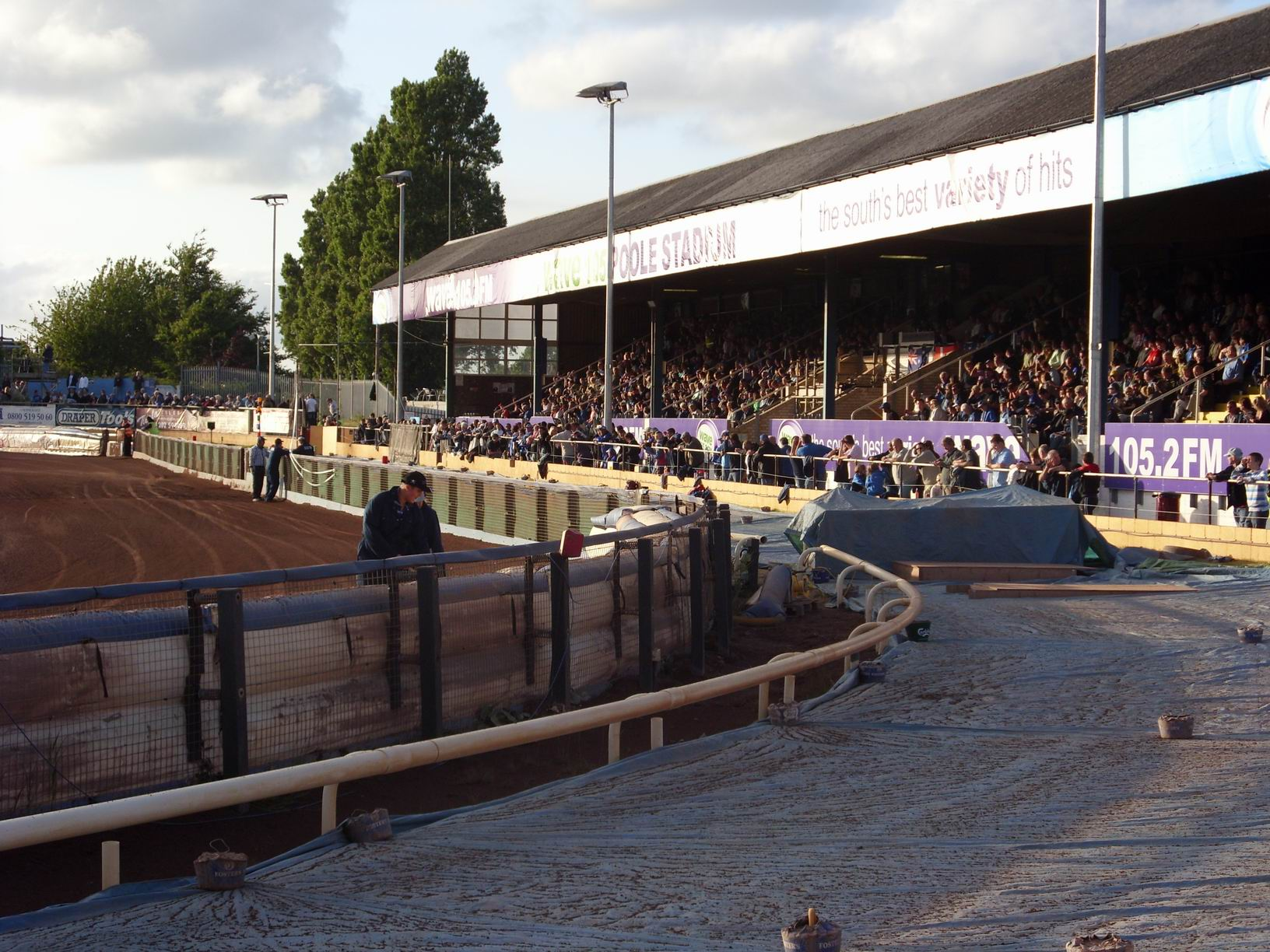
The east grandstand

The stadium has been home to speedway team the Poole Pirates since the club was created in 1948 and speedway has taken place at the stadium every year since. Prior to 1948, a cycle track had surrounded the football pitch until it was replaced with the larger speedway track. Poole Stadium was chosen to host the 2004 Speedway World Cup final by organiser Benfield Sports International (BSI). Poole hosted the qualifying race-off and the final which took place on 7 August with Sweden becoming the 2004 World Champions. Temporary stands were erected around the corners of the track to provide 2,200 extra seats. The official attendance figure at the stadium for the final was 7,131.

Poole Speedway is officially 299.1m long and the track record is 56.91 set by Sweden's Antonio Lindback on 14 June 2006.

== Sidecar Speedway ==
A number of top Sidecar meeting have been held at Wimborne Road. The British Championship was held in 2002 and 2003 and two Super Cup rounds were held in 2001. Gary Jackson and Carl Pugh won by British Championships. Craig Cheetham & Clive Reynolds won both rounds in the Super Cup.

== Greyhound racing ==
Facilities included a modern glass fronted grandstand which incorporated a 312-seat restaurant, two bars, full Tote betting facilities and multiple viewing screens. Race nights used to take place on Tuesday, Saturday and Sunday evenings.

=== History ===
Greyhound racing was introduced to the stadium in 1960 after the Southampton Greyhound Stadium owners Charlie Knott Sr. & Charlie Knott Jr. initiated plans to construct a track around the football pitch and speedway track. Charlie Jr. The venue underwent considerable change with a grandstand and terracing being introduced on both sides of the stadium.

On 8 May 1961 the opening meeting took place with the Mayor of Poole Alderman Bill Cole conducting the opening ceremony. There was an eight race card featuring five dogs in each race set up around a 380-yard circuit. The first ever winner was 'Count on Chippelgaun' a 5-1 shot in a time of 29.7 secs. The Racing Manager was aptly named D.J Poole before T.H.Pickett took over the hot seat.

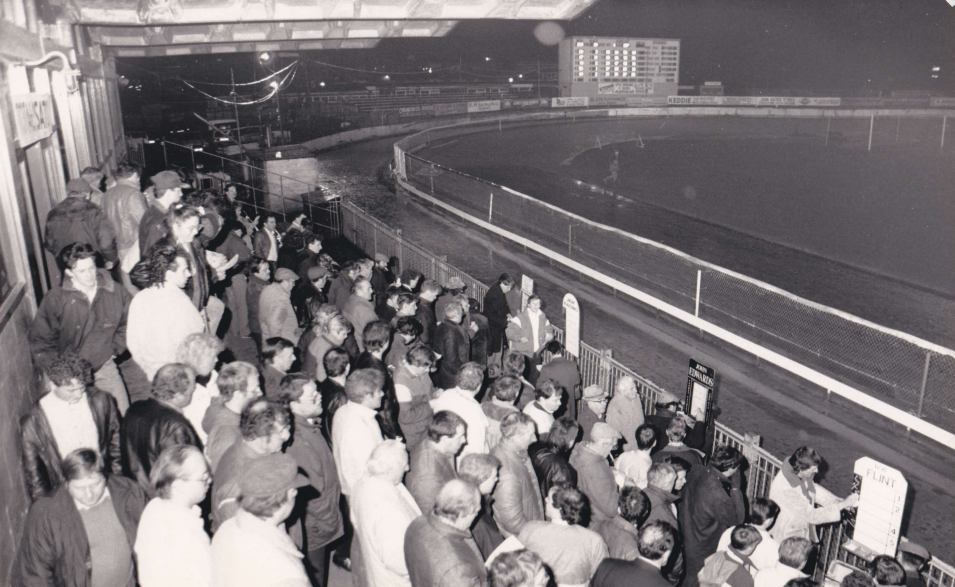
A 1970s' meeting at the stadium

The Knotts remained involved in Poole until 1980 when they sold their interest in the stadium. The leading trainers were Rita Randall and Pat Clarke and Ernie Walsh became the new Racing Manager. Following the sale the greyhound operation ran into difficulties and on 1 January 1985 closed down before the racing was brought back by TGV Ltd headed by Terry Bentham on 5 April that year. Simon Cross took over as Racing Manager from Ernie Walsh and TGV Ltd took the opportunity to conduct some renovations. Cross was soon to be replaced by Geoff Lee. Scurlogue Champ appeared on 12 July 1986 and broke the track record.

Facilities included a restaurant for 100 covers, a car park for 800 vehicles and two bars with all-sand circuit and an "Outside Sumner" hare. Racing continued on Thursday and Saturday nights until the ownership changed again to a company called Playbell Ltd who then removed the greyhound track to accommodate a larger football pitch on 30 June 1990.

In February 1992 hopes were revived that greyhound racing could return to Poole after plans were announced by the Derek Block owned Poole Stadium Development Corporation that they were looking to emulate a track such as Brighton & Hove Greyhound Stadium and Romford Greyhound Stadium. This sparked interest from the BS Group and they had discussions with the local authorities regarding the re-opening of Wimborne Road. Even the Greyhound Racing Association made it clear that they were monitoring the situation. The BS Group won the race and secured a long time lease from the Poole Borough Council in 1994 and racing finally returned with the football ceasing. The owners constructed a modern glass fronted grandstand on the east side of the stadium in 1997 which incorporated a 312-seat restaurant, two bars, full Tote betting facilities and multiple viewing screens.

The Golden Crest, which had been hosted by the track since 2000, had become the principal event surpassing the significance of the tracks previous main feature competition "The Wessex Vase". A major boost for arrived in 2012 when the track was awarded a BAGS contract for the first time.

In 2018 the stadium signed a deal with ARC to race every Tuesday and Sunday evening. In 2020, the stadium was closed due to COVID-19 pandemic, following the easing of restrictions of the lockdown, Poole Stadium Ltd (under parent company Gaming International) decided not to re-open and later, on 5 August, announced it was under a consultation period with the staff with the possibility of redundancies and the end of the greyhound racing at the venue.

On 22 September 2020 the permanent closure of greyhound racing at the site was announced, leaving Gaming International with one remaining site at Abbey Stadium, that later closed in December 2025.

=== Competitions ===
- Golden Crest

=== Track records ===
Current

| Distance metres | Greyhound | Time | Date | Notes |
|---|---|---|---|---|
| 250 | Only One Leemac | 14.74 | 22.04.2017 | |
| 450 | Daddy Knowsbest | 26.20 | 13.07.2013 | Golden Crest final |
| 640 | Clares Kyletaun | 38.56 | 14.04.2018 | |
| 840 | Blonde Pearl | 52.06 | 16.02.2007 | |

Former

| Distance | Greyhound | Time | Date | Notes |
|---|---|---|---|---|
| 230m | Office Whisper | 14.39 | 1989 | |
| 230m | Annekas Gold | 14.38 | 1989 | |
| 232m | Seamans Hope | 14.41 | 25.04.1985 | |
| 250m | Official Figure | 14.98 | 10.04.1998 | |
| 250m | Louisville | 14.96 | 07.02.2004 | |
| 250m | Kews Noble | 14.88 | 31.07.2007 | |
| 250m | Marinas Malouda | 14.78 | 06.05.2011 | |
| 445m | Railroad Tracker | 27.43 | 1989 | |
| 450m | August Twenty | 26.70 | 01.11.1997 | |
| 450m | Rosmon Major | 26.45 | 10.02.2007 | Golden Crest Semi-finals |
| 450m | Glynnscross Mal | 26.45 | 17.03.2009 | |
| 450m | Miss Crispys | 26.44 | 08.06.2010 | |
| 450m | Buzz Doc | 26.37 | 26.04.2011 | Golden Crest heats |
| 450m | Fifis Rocket | 26.30 | 30.04.2011 | Golden Crest Semi-finals |
| 450m | Lode Henry | 26.25 | 02.07.2013 | |
| 455m | Golden Sand | 27.34 | 30.08.1983 | |
| 630m | Chiltern Sarah | 39.92 | 1989 | |
| 632m | Westmead Call | | 1986 | |
| 632m | Farm Hill Jill | 40.00 | 25.09.1986 | |
| 640m | El Onda | 38.96 | 09.05.1998 | |
| 640m | Manners Slaney | 38.74 | 13.10.2007 | |
| 640m | Wise Totty | 38.68 | 26.04.2011 | |
| 840 | Musical Treat | 52.45 | 15.11.1997 | |
| 840 | Gift of Gold | 52.21 | 09.05.2000 | |
| 845m | Carker Coal | 55.48 | 1989 | |
| 855m | Scurlogue Champ | 54.86 | 12.07.1986 | |
| 445m H | Grove Whistler | 28.90 | 1989 | |
