= Spillers =

British food company (1829–1997)

Spillers Ltd
- Industry: Food
- Founded: 1829; 197 years ago
- Defunct: 1997; 29 years ago
- Fate: Acquired
- Headquarters: New Malden, Surrey
- Key people: Joel Spiller (founder)

Spillers Ltd was a British company that owned flour milling operations, operated bakeries and also sold pet food and equine feeds.

== History ==
The business originated in 1829 from the establishment of a flour mill in Bridgwater, Somerset, by Joel Spiller. The business rapidly expanded to other parts of England and Wales. In 1855 Spillers began to manufacture ships' biscuits.

By 1854, Spiller opened a flour mill in Cardiff with his business partner Samuel Browne. The mill burned down in 1882 and was rebuilt in 1887 incorporating two other mills. In 1893 a mill was built in Cardiff that formed part of a complex of steam-powered roller mills with a capacity of 100,000 tons per year.

In 1889 the business merged with William Baker and Sons of Bristol to form Spillers and Bakers Ltd.

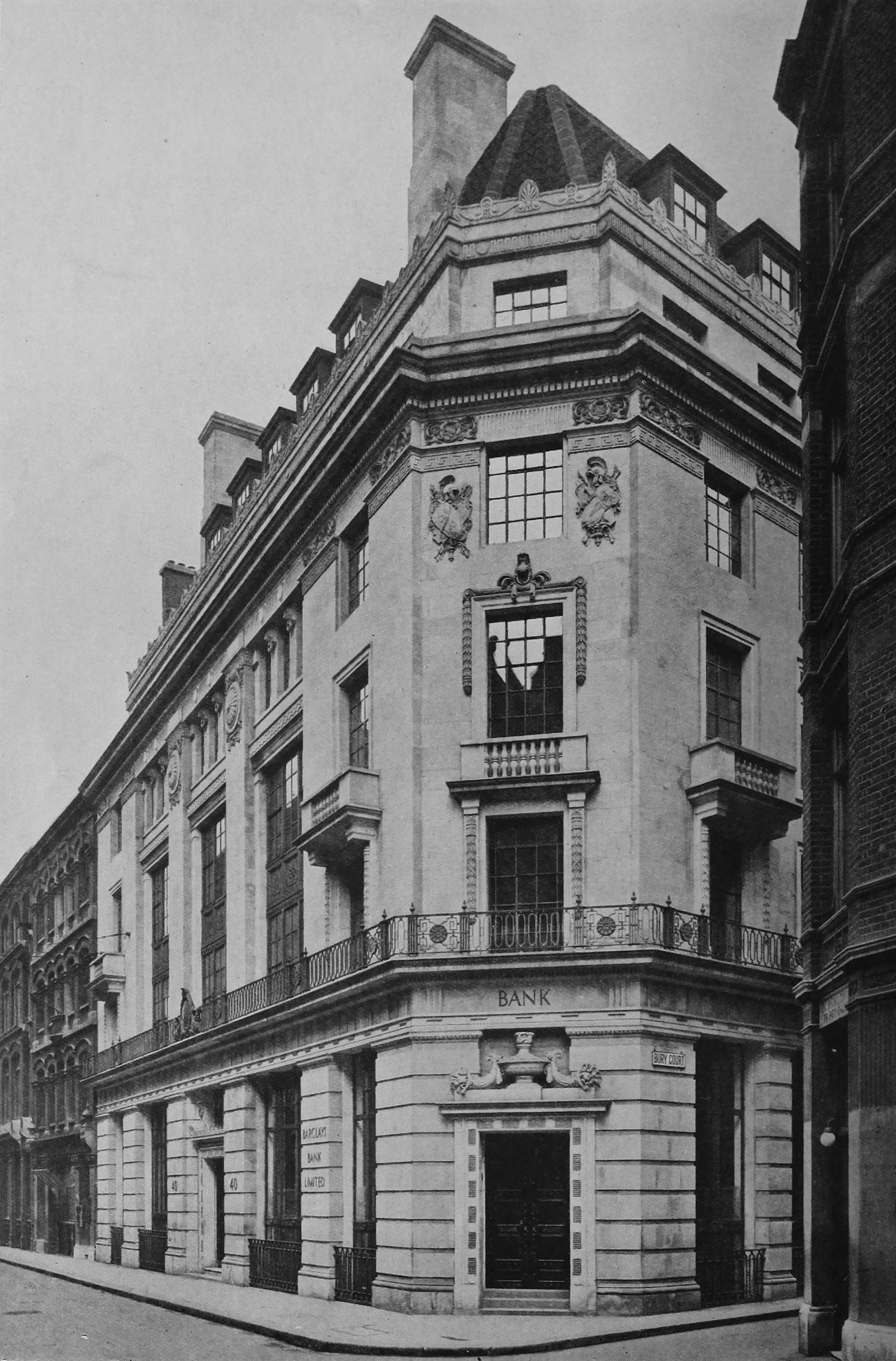
The 1925 head office at 38 St Mary Axe in the City of London, designed by Sir Edwin Cooper

At the beginning of the 20th century Spillers introduced the Turog brand of brown bread. Spillers made the flour which was sold to bakers who were licensed to make Turog bread, which Spillers promoted by advertising. Turog was a competitor to Hovis, which used the same business model.

Winalot dog biscuits were introduced by Spillers in 1927. They were initially marketed as a food for racing greyhounds, but soon gained popularity with pet-owners and became a brand leader in the 1930s. After its acquisition by Nestlé 1998, the Winalot brand was expanded to include a range of dog foods and snacks.

In 1947, Spillers acquired Foster Mill next to Cambridge railway station.

In 1964, Spillers took over the Kennomeat dog food brand with its acquisition of a subsidiary of Robert Wilson & Sons, Scottish Animal Products Ltd.

In 1978, Spillers acquired Modern Maid Food Products Inc, of New Jersey, USA.

In 1979 Spillers was acquired by Dalgety plc, after a hostile take-over battle. The company's bakery business was spun off and sold to Allied Bakeries.

In the late 1990s, following the BSE outbreak in the United Kingdom, Dalgety entered into a series of disposals and sold Spillers flour milling operations to Kerry Group plc in 1997 and its pet foods business to Nestlé in 1998.
