= Ben Truman Stakes =

Greyhound racing competition

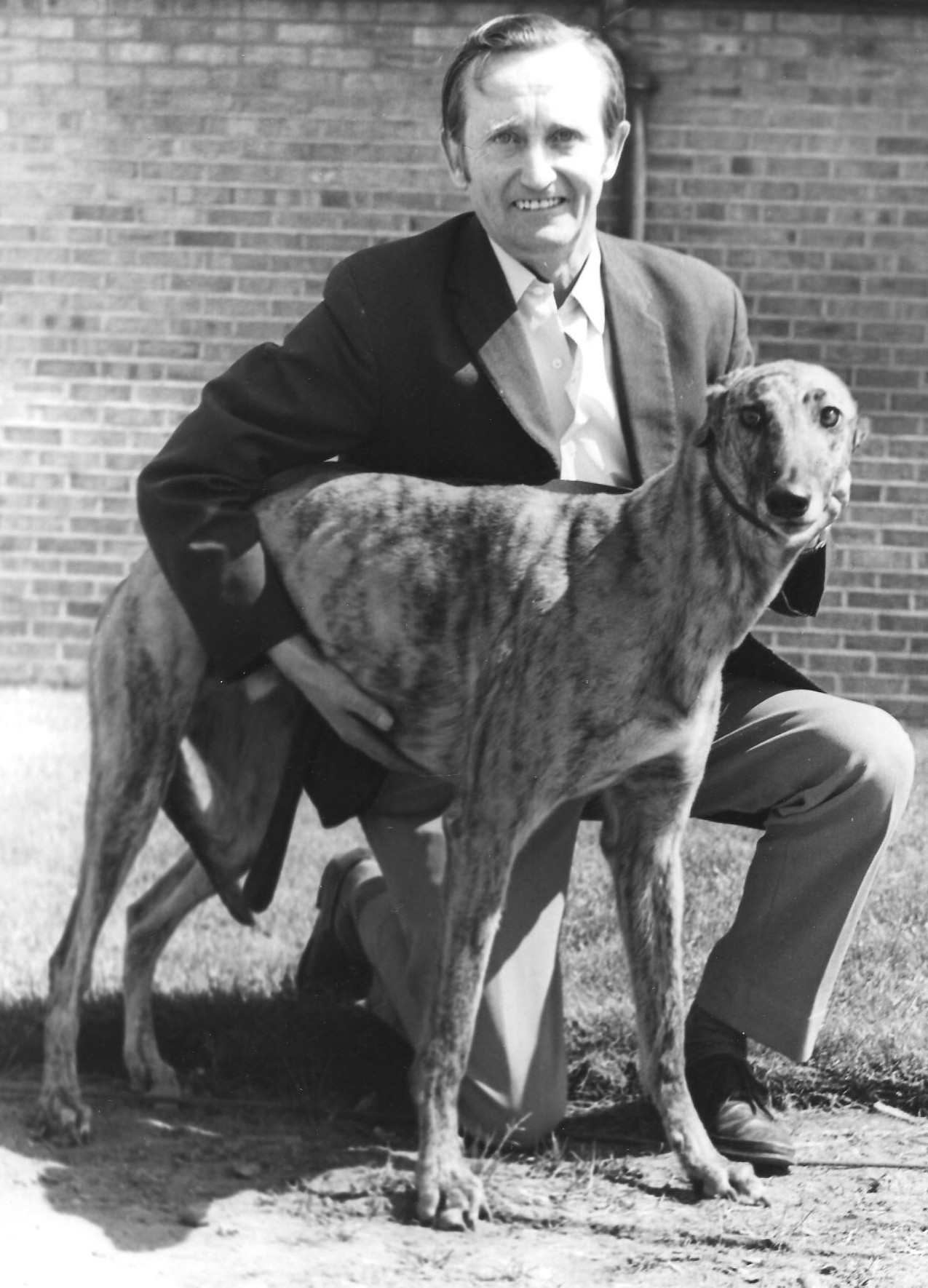
- 1972 winner Ramdeen Stuart
- Location: New Cross Stadium; Catford Stadium
- Inaugurated: 1962
- Final run: 1987

Race information
- Distance: various

The Ben Truman Stakes was a greyhound racing competition held primarily at New Cross Stadium and Catford Stadium from 1962 to 1988.

== History ==
The competition was held at New Cross Stadium from 1962 until 1968 but when New Cross Stadium closed on 3 April 1969 it switched to Charlton Stadium before finding a permanent home at Catford Stadium in 1971. The event changed the sponsor in 1988 and was discontinued after the 1988 running.

== Track & race distances ==
- 1962–1968 (New Cross Stadium, 600 yards)
- 1969–1970 (Charlton Stadium, 600 yards)
- 1971–1982 (Catford Stadium, 610 yards/555 metres)
- 1983–1988 (Catford Stadium, 781 metres)

== Sponsors ==
- 1962–1987 (Truman's Brewery)
- 1988–1988 (Webster's Yorkshire Bitter)

== Past winners ==
Year	Winner	Breeding	Trainer	Time (sec)	SP	Notes/Ref
1962	Greenane Boulevarde	Champion Prince – Lady Item	Dennis Hannafin (Wimbledon)	34.86		
1963	Riobally Chum	Riobally Shaun – Ivys Torment	B.Saunders (New Cross)	34.94		
1964	Little Baytown	Baytown Drone – Little Puss	G A Harding (Private)	34.64	11/8f	
1965	Feakles Foot	Feakles Luck – Oxgrove Dinkie	Ernie Butler (Private)	35.36		
1966	Galtymore Fire	The Grand Fire – Nancys Twilight	Norman Chambers (New Cross)	35.02		
1967	Wattlehurst Riot	Wattlehurst Rocket – Charity Ball	Sid Ryall (Private)	35.10		
1968	Wheatfield Sheba		Charlie Smoothy (New Cross)		5/4f	
1969	Meanus Donal	Movealong Donal – Today's Best	Wilf France (Harringay)	34.69	5/2jf	
1970	Sing The Song	Lovely Chieftain – Much Obliged	Tim Forster (Harringay)	34.43	2/1	
1971	Pepper Joe	Shanes Legacy – Kirbys Turn	Charlie Coyle (Private)	35.34	1/2f	
1972	Ramdeen Stuart	Sallys Story – Any Streak	Norman Oliver (Brough Park)	35.03	11/8f	
1973	Case Money	Booked Out – Jamboree	Ted Parker (Harringay)	35.44	1/4f	
1974	Gay Kathy	Monalee Champion – Kals Kathy	Tom Johnston Jr. (Wembley)	35.30	2/1	
1975	Portlairge Tipp	Spectre – Hack It Tipp	Mike Smith (Catford)	36.42	4/1	
1976	Kings Comet	Cobbler – Robins Silver	Mike Smith (Catford)	35.30	4/9f	
1977	Glenvale Prince	Empty Pride – April Lee	Terry Duggan (Romford)	35.18	2/1	
1978	Quakerfield Fun	Supreme Fun – Menace	Stan Gudgin (Harringay)	35.30	28/1	
1979	Quest For Gold	Faction Fighter – Noble Lynn	John Cox (Slough)	36.00	7/2	
1980	Dans Arrow	Itsachampion – Ivy Hall Sally	Pat Mullins (Cambridge)	35.11	2/5f	
1981	Metalina	Gaily Noble – Double Disaster	Jim Sherry (Reading)	35.82	20/1	
1982	Coomlogane Style	Satori Style – Mountleader Inca	John Horsfall (Catford)	34.90	6/4	
1983	Double Handful	Glin Fane – Solieado	Arthur Hitch (Oxford)	46.51	9/2	
1984	Lakefield Blue	Xmas Holiday – Sheila Alone	Kenny Linzell (Walthamstow)	46.26	7/1	
1985	Rosewood Girl	Sail On II – Leafy Glade	Kenny Linzell (Walthamstow)	45.98	5/1	
1986	Lamalighter	Brief Candle – Andreas Blue	Jenny March (Peterborough)	46.37	7/1	
1987	Winsor Way	McKays Way – Lady Sunday	Fred Wiseman (Milton Keynes)	46.37	4/5f	
1988	Exile Energy	Gambling Fever – Princess Nora	Gary Baggs (Walthamstow)	45.60	1/2f	
