= Greenwich Cup =

Greyhound racing competition

- Class: Category 1
- Location: New Cross Stadium; Catford Stadium
- Inaugurated: 1938
- Final run: 2003

Race information
- Distance: 555 metres
- Surface: Sand

The Greenwich Cup formerly the Greenwich Stakes, was a greyhound racing competition held annually from 1938 until 2003.

It was inaugurated at New Cross Stadium by the Greyhound Racing Association following their acquisition of the stadium in January 1938.

Following the closure of New Cross in 1969, it switched to Charlton Stadium. It only survived two years at Charlton because it also closed and the race found its final home at Catford Stadium in 1972. When the Greyhound Racing Association shut down Catford in 2003 the race was discontinued.

== Venues & distances ==
- 1938–1939 (New Cross, 550 yards)
- 1946–1964 (New Cross, 415 yards)
- 1965–1968 (New Cross, 600 yards)
- 1969–1970 (Charlton, 600 yards)
- 1972–2003 (Catford, 555 metres)

== Sponsors ==
- 1987–2000 (E.Coomes Bookmakers)
- 2001–2001 (Brake Bros)
- 2002–2003 (William Hill)

== Past winners ==
Year	Winner	Breeding	Trainer	Time	SP
1938	Congleton Lord		Bert Heyes (White City - London)	32.25 TR	4/6f
1939	Happy Squire	Happy Favourite – Happy Hest	H Grey (Southend)		11/8f
1946	Trev's Castle	Castledown Lad – Maries Treasure	Fred Trevillion (Private)	24.25	1/1f
1947	Trev's Castle	Castledown Lad – Maries Treasure	Fred Trevillion (Private)	24.31	2/1
1948	Bridget O'Leer	Train – Baytown Daisy	P Currie (Private)	24.28	20/1
1949	Cameo Corner	Tanimon – Lovers Loan	G Scadgell (Private)	24.65	100/6
1950	Belingas Fancy	Grosvenor Flexion - Belinga	Ron Chamberlain (Private)	24.44	5/2
1951	Monachdy Mondays Flirt	Daring Flash – Mondays Luck	Jimmy Jowett (Warrington)	24.60	5/1
1952	Cinderellas Favourite	Bahs Choice – Printers Cinderella	Paddy McEvoy (Private)	24.72	3/1
1953	Judy Luck	Trevs Cutter – Queens Wood	Stan Martin (Wimbledon)	24.13	7/2
1954	Cree Dusk	Heavy Swell – Gala Beauty	Sidney Orton (Wimbledon)	24.24	5/4f
1955	Clever Slipper	Ballylanigan Tanist – Smiling Amy	Ivor Morse (Harringay)	24.54	3/1
1956	Lady Linnett	Ollys Pal – Pride Of Castlerea	Jimmy Jowett (Clapton)	24.10	5/1
1957	Silver Strand	Hurry Abdul – Moody Dreamer	Dennis Hannafin (Wimbledon)	24.21	9/4
1958	Precious Princess	Champion Prince - Babsie	Dal Hawkesley (West Ham)	23.98	4/1
1959	Miss Cheerful	Cheerful Chariot – Miss Mink	Dave Geggus (Walthamstow)	24.44	1/2f
1960	Collettes Champion	Thaumaturgas – Freckled Lady	Les Parry (White City - London)	24.92	100/6
1961	Glideaway Colleen	Solar Prince – Glenaree Bluebell	Joe Pickering (White City - London)	24.34	
1962	Beauties Dash	Romantic Slievenamon – Bright Shock	John Haynes (Private)	24.23	
1963	Rosina	Irish Quarter – Barbara Joan	Clare Orton (Wimbledon)	24.07	
1964	Lady Dumper	The Grand Final – Susies Luck	G Jackson (Private)	23.77	11/4
1965	Ballyloo Hind	Hi There – Craan Majestic	Sid Ryall (Private)	34.90	
1966	Laughing Flame	Prairie Flash - Leading Rose	Peter Collett (Private)	36.24	8/11f
1967	Bettystown Lass	Wonder Valley - Dunstown Mayoress	Terry O'Sullivan (Crayford)	35.09	10/1
1968	Shady Bunny	Crazy Parachute - Shady Contempera	Adam Jackson (Clapton)	35.18	8/1
1969	Annahope	Toast Again - Princess Hope	Paddy McEllistrim (Wimbledon)	35.24	7/2jf
1970	Wee Garryduff	Newdown Heather - Marjorie	Tom Johnston Jr. (Wembley)	34.58	5/2
1972	Mini Moose	Moose Jet - Small Idea	Charlie Coyle (Private)	24.40	10/11f
1973	By Design	Kilbeg Kuda - Yellow Tape	Emil Kovac (Private)	23.77	4/1
1974	High Priestess	Russian Gun - Woodbrook Blonde	John Horsfall (Catford)	35.39	1/1f
1975	Mystery Careless	Careless Black - Silly Monet	Frank Melville (Harringay)	35.81	6/1
1976	Paradise Peg	Commutering - Rit Peg Princess	Ted Griffin (Private)	34.82	8/11f
1977	Weston Wonderful	Kilbelin Style - Trojan Silver	Reg Young (Bletchley)	35.12	4/1
1978	Loyal Katie	Loyal Expert - Merry Pixie	John Honeysett (Crayford)	35.01	2/5f
1979	How Much	Miles Apart - Wheatfield Crow	Pat Mullins (Private)	36.09	3/1
1980	Weston Bluebell	Clear Reason - Weston Star	Barry Austin (Coventry)	35.40	8/1
1981	Prohibition	Moonshine Bandit - Glorious Day	Pat Mullins (Cambridge)	35.85	11/8f
1982	Apapa Song	Lacca Champion - Lassinagh Style	Linda Mullins (Cambridge)	34.83	1/1f
1983	Ceili Lass	Ceili Band - Small Panda	Adam Jackson (Wembley)	35.37	3/1
1984	If So	Blushing Spy - Ladys Pal	Sam Sykes (Wimbledon)	35.50	11/4f
1985	Velvet Vicky	Ivy Hall Solo - Check Style	Sam Sykes (Wimbledon)	35.00	11/10f
1986	Ballyhaden Queen	Knockrour Street - Sweeping Bally	Stan Gudgin (Harringay)	35.18	11/4
1987	Anneka	Spartacus - Cobbling Rose	Terry Dartnall (Wembley)	34.84	9/4jf
1988	Catch Ruby	Easy And Slow - Catch Mint	Harry White (Maidstone)	34.96	15/8
1989	Alley Bally	Alleys Blue - Penmaric	Terry Dartnall (Wembley)	34.59	4/7f
1990	Rock On John	Captain Miller - Stakehill Fancy	Paul Tompsett (Crayford)	33.05	10/1
1991	Express Mail	Curryhills Fox - Queen Of Hearts	John Coleman (Walthamstow)	35.13	1/1f
1992	Liberal Girl	Easy And Slow - Ballinvard Rose	Derek Knight (Hove)	34.84	11/10f
1993	Unlikely	Tapwatcher - Mninga Multibet	John McGee Sr. (Reading)	34.92	7/4
1994	Wexford Minx	Manorville Major - Ballarue Suzy	Derek Knight (Hove)	34.70	4/9f
1995	Deenside Joe	Willie Joe - Deenside Sunset	John Honeysett (Wembley)	34.78	4/1
1996	Barefoot Heix	Frightful Flash - Barefoot Mandy	Paddy Milligan (Catford)	34.71	6/1
1997	Roses Opinion	Leaders Best - Yagoodthing	Mick Puzey (Walthamstow)	35.04	6/4f
1998	Lenson Billy	Slaneyside Hare - Ballydaly Flyer	Norah McEllistrim (Wimbledon)	34.85	1/1f
1999	Westmead Leo	Shanless Slippy - Celtic Lady	Nick Savva (Milton Keynes)	34.77	20/1
2000	Allez Viera	Frightful Flash - Cool Rhythm	John McGee Sr. (Private)	35.07	10/1
2001	Koko Casino	Small Fortune - Sonic Bluebell	Gerry Ballentine (Milton Keynes)	34.86	9/2
2002	Droopys Candice	Come On Ranger - Droopys Chloe	Brian Clemenson (Hove)	34.53	10/1
2003	Shevchenko	Toms The Best - All Up Front	Seamus Cahill (Wimbledon)	35.04	9/2
