= New Cross Stadium =

Former sports venue in London

Coordinates: 51°28′55″N 0°2′56″W

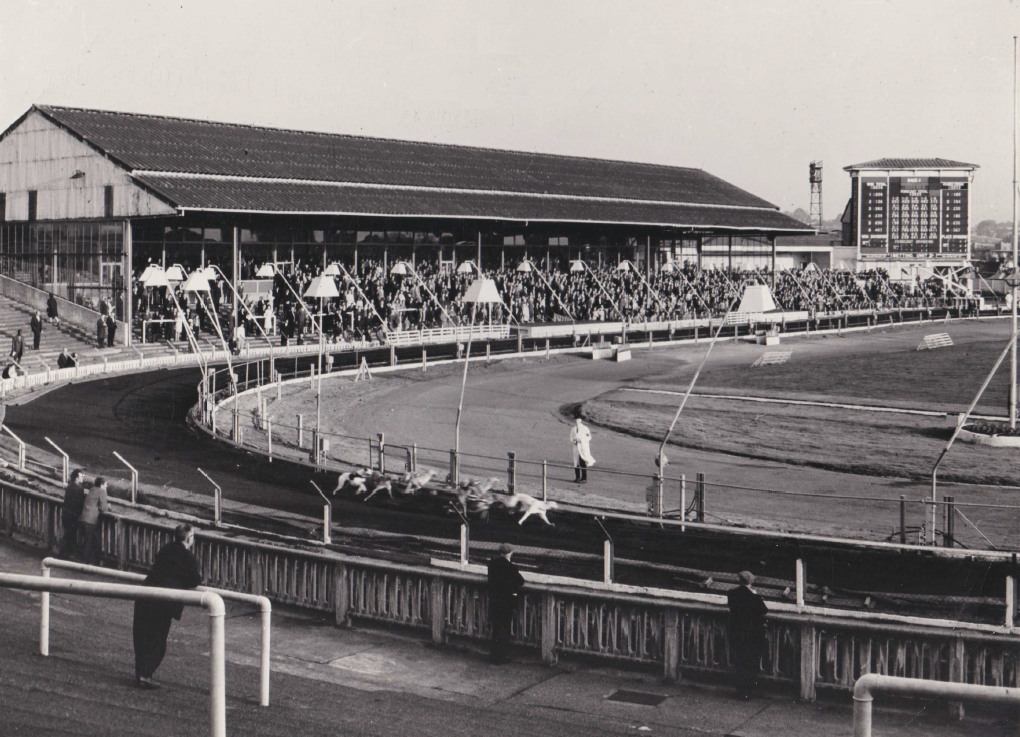
- Greyhound racing at the Stadium circa.1950
- Interactive map of New Cross Stadium
- Location: Old Kent Road, South East London, England

Construction
- Opened: 1 June 1933
- Closed: 3 April 1969

New Cross Stadium, Hornshay Street, Old Kent Road, in South East London opened 1 June 1933, as a greyhound racing stadium and later speedway. The ground was adjacent to The Old Den, the then home of Millwall F.C. and was used as a training ground by the club when they did not have facilities of their own. The track was often referred to as 'The Frying Pan'. It was built inside the greyhound track and had banking all the way round. At the time of its closure in 1969 the stadium had a capacity of 26,000. The stadium was demolished in 1975.

== Origins ==
Previously the site had been used for athletics during the early 1900s. In 1933, the site was used for a new stadium construction. The construction cost the New Cross Greyhounds Ltd £100,000 and the stadium was designed by Mr. G. Simpson and built by Robert McAlpine & Sons.

== Greyhound racing ==
=== History ===
The greyhound track was small compared to the average London track and the racing was initially independent (unaffiliated to a governing body). The track was a very tight circumference of 354 yards with a surface of peat, short straights of 86 yards and heavily banked bends. The stadium could accommodate 25,000 people.

The opening race meeting was held on Thursday 1 June 1933 and was opened by the celebrities Cicely Courtneidge and Jack Hulbert. Mr L. O. Browne was appointed as the first Racing Manager. The main race distance was over 550 yards. The first trainers were John 'Jack' Kennedy, Bill Smith, Godfrey Hyde Clark and Harry Spoor and a complex of 200 kennels were attached to the stadium. In 1934, the kennels increased to 250 and Albert Bedford joined the training ranks.

Before the start of the war the stadium was acquired by the Greyhound Racing Association (GRA), who took a controlling interest in January 1938. The GRA subsequently licensed the track with the National Greyhound Racing Club (NGRC), with the first meeting under rules taking place during January 1938.

Also in 1938, the GRA introduced a new competition called the Greenwich Stakes (later to be called the Greenwich Cup) and this was soon followed by the Berkeley Cup in 1939, held over 415 yards. Both events were the principal events at the stadium and they became prominent races on the open race circuit.

After the war Totalisator turnover figures peaked at £3,095,736. The healthy bank balance of the New Cross Greyhounds Ltd Company and the GRA allowed the construction of three new covered stands, two on the home straight and one on the back straight. Restaurant buffet bars, tea buffet bars and licensed bars were to be found in all three enclosures.

In 1946, the hare system used was a 'Sumner' and the kennel facilities for the New Cross trainers were situated at nearby Silwood Street within ten minutes walking distance of the track.

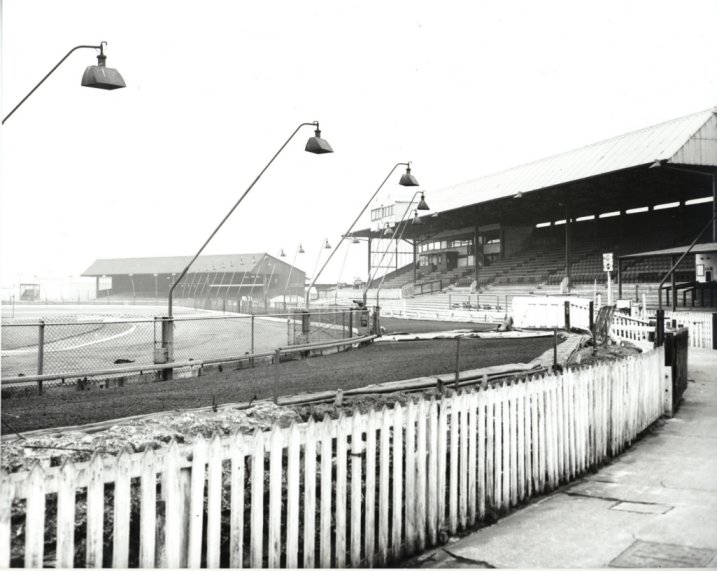
New Cross Stadium 1950s

Trainer Jack Tallantire joined the track in 1952 and Joe Pickering experienced great success that included a double English/Scottish Grand National win by Prince Lawrence in 1954 and 1955. Pickering also lifted the Trafalgar Cup with Our Tim II.

A third major competition called the Ben Truman Stakes was introduced in 1962, when the training ranks consisted of Norman Chambers, Sanders, John Shevlin, Smith and Charlie Smoothy.

John Field arrived as the new Racing Manager in the 1960s and in August 1968 the usual racing schedule of Thursday and Saturday nights was altered after the introduction of Bookmakers Afternoon Greyhound Service (BAGS) fixtures when the Stamford Bridge closed to greyhound racing.

=== Closure ===
The BAGS racing lasted less than one year, when the stadium closed with relatively little notice on 3 April 1969 after difficulties over the lease with landowners British Rail.

The stadium was left derelict for several years until it was demolished in 1975 as part of a plan to redevelop the football ground, although those plans fell through. The site is now a public open space called Bridge House Meadows. Millwall F.C. have since moved to a new site north of the stadium, with houses now occupying the location of their old ground.

=== Competitions ===
==== Berkeley Cup ====
Extended content

The Berkeley Cup was inaugurated in 1939. The competition was given dispensation to be held during World War II but the 1940 edition was postponed.

Year	Winner	Trainer	Time	SP
1939	Return Fare II	Arthur Jonas (Stamford Bridge)	25.11	5/2
1941	Ballynennan Moon	Sidney Orton (Wimbledon)	30.07	13/8f
1943	Wavecrest II	Tom Johnston Sr. (Private)	30.23	3/1
1946	Winsome Seal	Gordon Nicholson (Catford)	24.39	1/5f
1947	Latest Selection	Lilah Shennan (Private)	24.85	7/1
1948	Jacks Arrow	Stanley Biss (Clapton)	24.37	100/8
1949	Buzzing Afterwards	Alf Turner (Catford)	24.13	5/1
1950	Derrycrussan	Tom Smith (Clapton)	24.22	4/9f
1951	Pluckanes Belle	Jack Harvey (Wembley)	24.10	5/-1
1952	Kale Seed	Gunner Smith (Private)	24.12	5/2
1953	Home Luck	Stan Martin (Wimbledon)	23.68	1/6f
1954	Baby Joe	Harry Spoor (New Cross)	24.08	8/1
1955	Rosey Coaldust	Paddy McEvoy (Private)	24.08	8/1
1956	Rosey Coaldust	Paddy McEvoy (Private)	24.24	2/1jf
1957	Charming Style	Henry Parsons (Crayford)	24.26	7/4f
1958	Town Prince	Leslie Reynolds (Wembley)	23.97	11/10f
1959	Sporting Magger	Dal Hawkesley (West Ham)	24.43	100/7
1960	Victory Streak	John Shevlin (New Cross)	23.80	2/1
1961	Wonder Blue	Ernie Butler (Private)	23.64	33/1
1962	Greenane Boulevarde	Dennis Hannafin (Wimbledon)	24.48	
1963	Greenane Boulevarde	Dennis Hannafin (Wimbledon)	23.99	
1964	Tralong Jet	John Shevlin (New Cross)	24.54	4/1
1965	Mimi II	Ivy Regan (Private)	34.80	
1966	Fawn Poacher	Ernie Butler (Private)	34.90	
1967	Big Rocket	Henry Parsons (Crayford)	35.34	
1968	Local View	John Shevlin (New Cross)	35.22	

(New Cross, 415 yards)

=== Track records ===
Extended content

Distance yards	Greyhound	Time	Date	Notes
415	Bantown Banner	24.02	31 May 1938	
415	Winsome Seal	23.96	31 May 1938	Berkeley Cup semi final
415	Floating Dingy	23.92	13 July 1946	
415	Home Luck	23.48	13 April 1954	
550	Knockbrack Flyer	32.52	September 1935	
550	Congleton Lord	32.25	26 April 1938	
550	Prince Norroy	32.26	25 October 1941	
550	Tuturama	31.26	1963	
600	Kinauld Demonstrator	35.17	26 July 1938	
600	Shadowlands Delight	35.02	6 September 1947	
600	Gambling Dick	34.95	September 1951	
600	Silent Leader	34.50	27 August 1964	
770	The Black Freak	46.12	November 1958	
770	Magic Brooklyn	=46.12	December 1959	
770	Buckwheat	45.38	26 October 1963	
880	Ray-O-Vitol	52.62	2 June 1962	
415 H	Knockbrack Flyer	24.82	6 April 1938	
415 H	Vintners Cup	24.16	13 April 1957	
600 H	Mira Chara	36.57	24 August 1939	
600 H	Mazel Tov	36.22	November 1958	
600 H	R.S.II	35.47	1 September 1962	

== Speedway ==
The stadium held speedway from 1934 to 1967. The teams were known as the New Cross Lambs (1934–35), then the New Cross Tamers (1936) and finally the New Cross Rangers from 1937 to 1963.

In 1935 Tom Farndon was killed after crashing at the stadium The stadium was used in the 1949 film Once a Jolly Swagman (released as Maniacs on Wheels in the US) starring Dirk Bogarde as a speedway rider and Sid James as the team promoter.

== Stock car racing ==
The birth of oval track stock car racing in the UK and the first ever BriSCA Formula One Stock Car Racing took place at the New Cross Stadium, London on Good Friday, 16 April 1954. The final was won by car 11, Chevalier D'Orgeix. Racing continued here until 1956. Three meetings also took place in 1968 whilst Harringay was being revamped.

During 1966 racing at the stadium was promoted by Spedeworth International and had its own team, the London Sparrows, who also had Wimbledon Stadium as its home track. The London Sparrows team included Del Stickings, Dave Pierce, Graham North, Johnny Melia, Ken Lambert, John O’Hagon, John Watts, Les Collins, Todd Sweeney and Harry Andrews.
