= 1963 Irish Greyhound Derby =

- Venue: Harold's Cross Stadium
- Location: Dublin
- End date: 9 August
- Total prize money: £1,250 (winner)

The 1963 Irish Greyhound Derby took place during July and August with the final being held at Harold's Cross Stadium in Dublin on 9 August 1963.

The winner Drumahiskey Venture won £1,250 and was trained, owned and bred by Mrs Eithne Hammond.

== Final result ==
At Harold's Cross, 9 August (over 525 yards):

Position	Winner	Breeding	Trap	SP	Time	Trainer
1st	Drumahiskey Venture	Odd Venture - Drumahiskey Girl	1	5-4f	29.60	Mrs Eithne Hammond
2nd	Powerstown Proper	Hi There - Faoide	5	20-1	29.96	Sean Murphy
3rd	Melody Wonder	Pigalle Wonder - Racing Millie	4	5-1	30.02	Jack Mullan
4th	Laundry Maid	Hi There - Parchments Bella	2	4-1		Denny Lennon
5th	Rocks Commander	unknown	6	9-2		
6th	Hi Spark	Hi There - Wild Princess	3	7-1		Paddy Cross

=== Distances ===
4½, ¾ (lengths)

== Competition Report ==
Black July was a leading contender having performed well the previous year in 1962; the black dog had since ran well in the 1963 English Greyhound Derby. One greyhound that failed to make the line up was General Courtnowski who had just won the Easter Cup and St Leger double, the Patsy Browne trained fawn dog was being rested. Melody Wonder was ante-post favourite with Black July, Trigo Cup winner Memory Lane, Laundry Maid and Jamie Sarra all expected to go well.

In the first round Black July suffered bad luck finishing lame but the fastest heat winner was Drumahiskey Venture trained by Eithne Hammond who won in a time of 29.58. Other winners included Bannside King, Memory Lane, Tunsgram and the Paddy Dunphy pair of Grand Friday and April Twilight.

Drumahiskey Venture posted the fastest time again in round two recording a fast 29.40. Melody Wonder lost again but still qualified by virtue of another second place. Bannside King and Rocks Commander both remained unbeaten.

Before the semi-finals Memory Lane was sold for £2,000 and then withdrawn after being found lame. Laundry Maid and Drumahiskey Venture qualified from the first semi-final, the former winning in 29.44; Hi Spark defeated Powerstown Proper in the second before there was a sensation in the third. Rocks Commander was caught near the line to lose by a short head to Jamie Serra after leading easily; the stewards then disqualified the latter for fighting and the pre competition favourite Melody Wonder was promoted to the final despite finishing third.

In the final Drumahiskey Venture drew trap one and was sent off at 5-4 favourite. He caught the outsider Powerstown Proper by the third bend and drew clear to win by 4½ lengths. Melody Wonder ran on well again to finish third and would go on to lift the National Sprint. Powerstown Proper also gained further honours by winning the Laurels later that year.

== See also ==
- 1963 UK & Ireland Greyhound Racing Year
