= Drayton Bassett =

Village in Staffordshire, England

Coordinates: 52.60°N 1.72°W

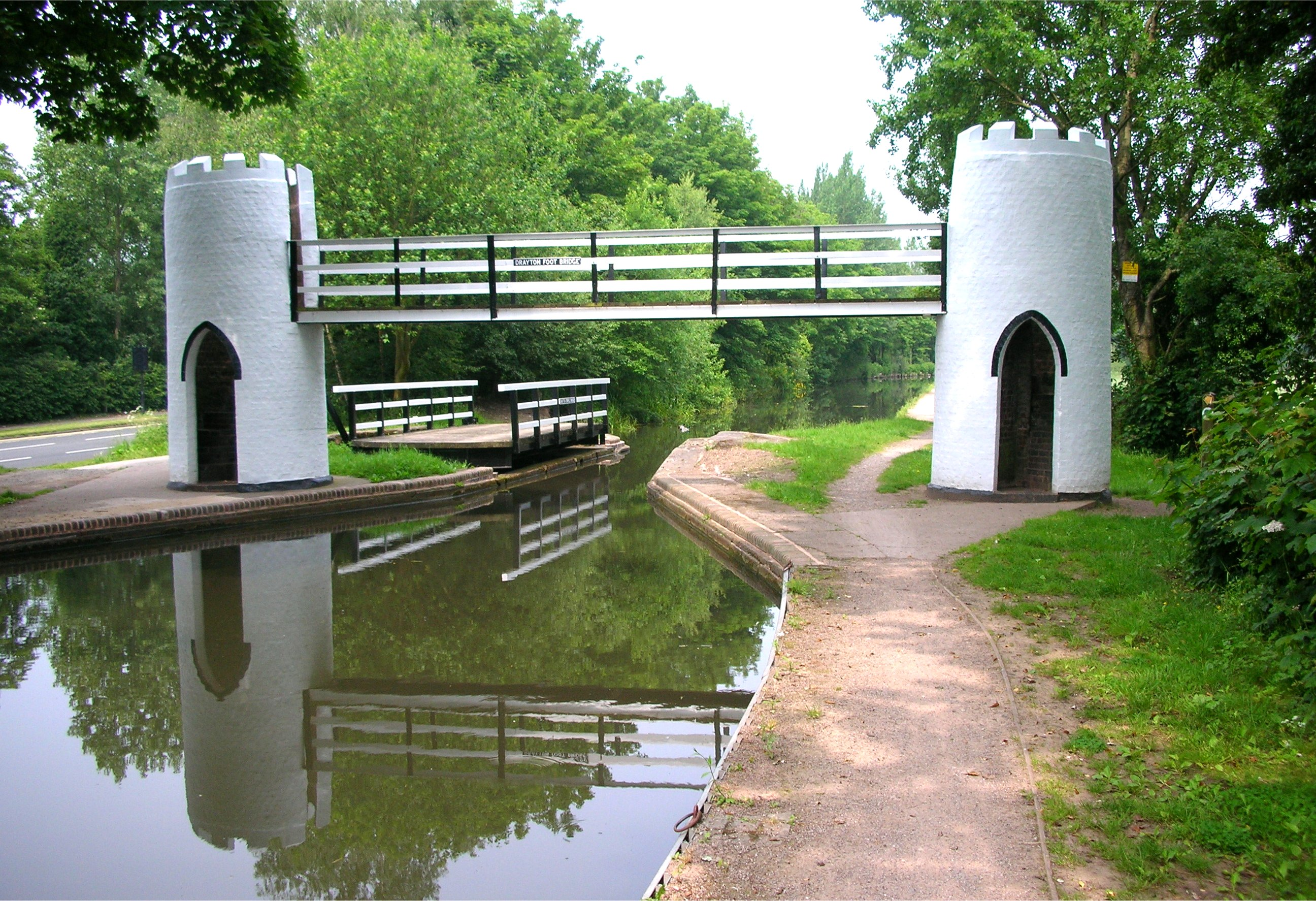
- The folly-like footbridge and adjacent swing bridge over the Birmingham and Fazeley Canal near Drayton Bassett, one mile from Fazeley Junction

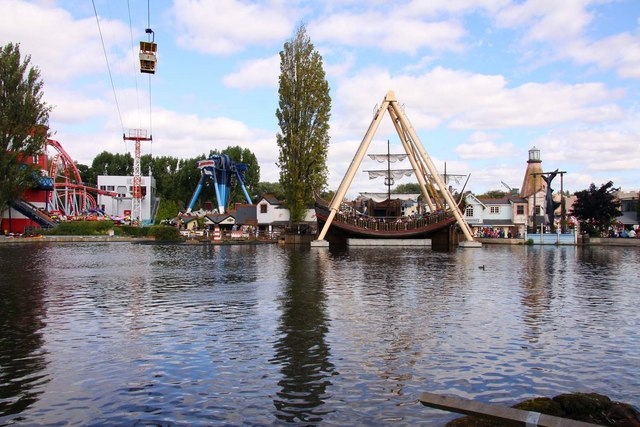
- Drayton Manor Theme Park from across the lake

- Location within Staffordshire
- Area: 12.72 km^{2} (4.91 sq mi)
- Population: 1,037 (2011 census)
  - Density: 82/km^{2} (210/sq mi)
- OS grid reference: SK1900
- Civil parish: Drayton Bassett
- District: Lichfield
- Shire county: Staffordshire
- Region: West Midlands
- Country: England
- Sovereign state: United Kingdom
- Post town: TAMWORTH
- Postcode district: B78
- Dialling code: 01827
- Police: Staffordshire
- Fire: Staffordshire
- Ambulance: West Midlands
- UK Parliament: Tamworth

Drayton Bassett is a village and civil parish since 1974 in Lichfield District in Staffordshire, England. The village is on the Heart of England Way, a footpath. Much of the housing is clustered together but more than half is 20th century in the parish as a whole. In the parish is Drayton Manor Theme Park, occupying a large minority of its land.

North of the adjoining suburb or town of Fazeley is the large town of Tamworth. The eastern lands of the parish form the bulk of Middleton Lakes RSPB reserve which has lakes of various sizes and has replaced an area of gravel workings (excavation).

== History ==
=== Geographic history ===
After the Norman Conquest the manor came to the Basset(t) (of Drayton) family until the change of ruling dynasty/faction year 1483, when it passed to the Earls of Leicester. From about 1600 it belonged to the Earls of Essex. It was sold piecemeal but its bulk was sold from the Marquis of Bath to Sir Robert Peel, 1st Baronet, father of the later Prime Minister, Sir Robert Peel (lived 1788–1850) with a certain Mr Wilkes, by hearsay spoken to Arthur Young for £138,000 (equivalent to £18,000,000 in 2025) in about 1791 as an intensive investment. The namesake son who was creator of the Metropolitan Police Force for London, often lived in Drayton Manor House (demolished and along with some of its land converted from the agriculture it had been used as for more than 800 years to Drayton Manor Theme Park). Peel is buried in the vault of the parish church. A contemporary quotation of Peel and co-entrepreneur Wilkes' endeavour explains their paternalistic use of cheap labour and pocket boroughs:-

From [Drayton Bassett] we proceeded to Faseley [Fazeley], a part of the same great property, purchased so ably and so fortunately for the promotion of commercial speculation. This is probably the first situation for an inland town that is to be found in Great Britain, for here is the junction of the Birmingham and Coventry canals, which unite Hull, Liverpool, Bristol, and London...here is all that communication can confer: coals under the whole country, offers, perhaps of all others, the most important advantage. Here Messrs. Wilkes and Peele(sic) [purchasers mentioned above at a very high price] have built a cotton mill, which is now in full work by day, but never by night, so the objection which has been made on that account to these admirable exertions of human ingenuity do not hold here. This situation is so favourable, in relation to communication, plenty of water, cheapness of coals, and cheapness of labour, that Messrs. Peele and Wilkes may reasonably hope to be the founders of a new town on this centre of all the inland navigations of England; Tamworth is but a mile distant, with an equal command of water and an unemployed poor, a cotton mill, and a printing one are there erected, and other establishments of the same complexion forming, which will in a few years give a new face to the whole neighbourhood. In the evening reach that place, where the people are fond of the idea of by and by rivaling Manchester, and speculative visions are rising in their minds, that they are better situated for a great manufacture... They have between 2500 and 3000 people, and had once a tolerable fabric of narrow cloths, but declined so much that there are not 20 looms left. The manor and antient castle, which frowns upon the town with feudal antiquity, are the property of the Marquis Townshend...; Mr. Peele (in consequence of buying the Marquis Of Bath's estate) [brings in an MP].

The parish lost about 18% then 5% in extent — falling from 3,940 acres (15.9 km^{2}) at some time in 1831 to 1851 then after small shifts fell before 1901 to close to the 3,147 acres (12.74 km^{2}) it reached and then stabilised at on a date in 1941-1951.

The Birmingham and Fazeley Canal and the Tame mark the eastern boundary. The canal can be crossed by a footbridge of simplified, white-painted lightly crenellated form. The village is on the Heart of England Way, a footpath which can also be used by off-road bicyclists.

=== Demographic history ===
Resident population:

Year	Population	Houses (recorded from 1831)
1801	395	
1811	455	
1821	468	
1831	459	77
1841	404	83
1851	408	90
1881	442	102
1891	461	99
1901	405	80
1911	370	not stated
1921	365	79
1931	523	116
1951	562	156
1961	767	234

In 1881 of the 125 working-age men 7/10ths were employed as farmers, woodmen or agricultural labourers (87) of whom 63 were the latter and two woodmen. Ten were employed in domestic services or offices (roles), (of which 7 were gardeners) six were "Workers and Dealers in House, Furniture and Decorations" and six "Animals" such as stableman (groom), five were "Workers and Dealers in Various Mineral Substances", the six other pre-written categories including government and professionals numbered not more than three male workers each.

As to the women of like age, 56 did not state a specific occupation or it was deemed illegible, 20 were indoor servants, 2 charwomen, 2 provided (clothes) washing or bathing services, 1 collected tolls, 1 was a warehouseperson or equivalent, one was an agricultural labourer (including farm servant or cottager, cottager still implying of the manor in return for work), one ran a public house/hotel, two worked/dealt in silk, two in tape, fifteen were likely pensioners or widows as in the category with two men of "Persons returned by Property, Rank etc. and not special occupation".

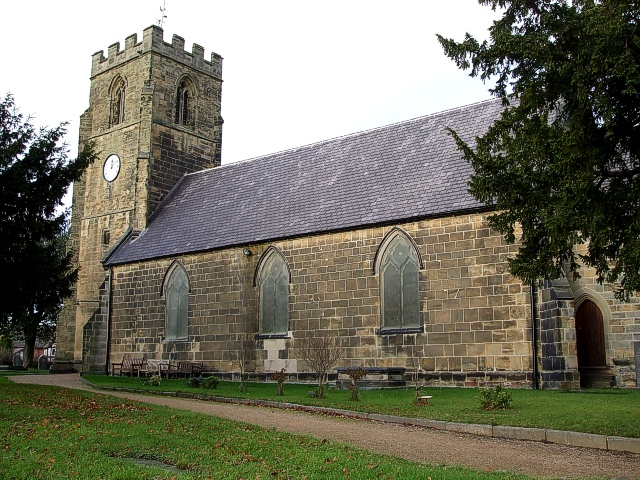
A very old version of St Peter's church crumbled and was severely damaged by a storm in 1792. Most is thus not 14th century except lower sections of the tower. Peel's family enlarged it to today's size

== Famous residents ==
- Lettice Knollys, later Countess of Essex and Countess of Leicester (1543-1635), Elizabethan courtier, lived at Drayton Bassett from 1593 to her death.
- Sir Walter Devereux (1591-1641), politician, was brought up at Drayton Bassett by his grandmother Lettice Knollys.
- Sir Robert Peel, 2nd Baronet (1788–1850), twice Prime Minister of the United Kingdom, lived at Drayton Bassett and is buried in the churchyard of St Peter Church.
- Rock/pop star Julian Cope (born 1957) lived in the village from the mid-1980s to the early-1990s.

== See also ==
- Listed buildings in Drayton Bassett
