= Listed buildings in Drayton Bassett =

Drayton Bassett is a civil parish in the district of Lichfield, Staffordshire, England. It contains six buildings that are recorded in the National Heritage List for England. Of these, one is listed at Grade II*, the middle grade, and the others are at Grade II, the lowest grade. The parish contains the village of Drayton Bassett and the surrounding area. The Minworth to Fazeley branch of the Birmingham and Fazeley Canal passes through the parish, and the listed buildings associated with this are three bridges of differing types. The other listed buildings are a church, a house, and a farmhouse.

== Key ==
Grade	Criteria
II*	Particularly important buildings of more than special interest
II	Buildings of national importance and special interest

== Buildings ==
Name and location	Photograph	Date	Notes	Grade
St Peter's Church; 52.59933°N 1.71661°W		15th century (probable)	The church was altered in 1793 and again in about 1855, the oldest part being the tower. The church is built in stone with a slate roof, and consists of a nave dated 1793, a chancel from about 1855, a northeast vestry, and a west tower. The tower has three stages, a massive northwest buttress, a south doorway with a pointed head, and an embattled parapet.	II*
Drayton House; 52.60426°N 1.70704°W	—	Early to mid 18th century	A parallel range was added to the north in the 19th century, and the roofs are in tile and slate. The south range has two storeys and an attic, and two bays, and it contains one sash window and a narrow window, the other windows being casements with segmental heads. The north range has two storeys and three bays, sash windows with segmental heads, and a doorway with panels, pilasters and a fanlight.	II
Drayton Footbridge; 52.60464°N 1.70652°W		Late 18th century	The footbridge crosses the Minworth to Fazeley branch of the Birmingham and Fazeley Canal. On each side of the canal is a cylindrical stair turret in painted red brick, with a pointed-arched doorway and an embattled parapet. Between the turrets is a footbridge with a stone parapet.	II
Drayton Swivel Bridge; 52.60467°N 1.70653°W		Late 18th century	The swivel bridge carries a track over the Minworth to Fazeley branch of the Birmingham and Fazeley Canal. It has cast iron mountings and hand rail, a wooden floor, and a stone surround.	II
Hill Farmhouse; 52.60726°N 1.74297°W	—	Late 18th century	The farmhouse is in red brick with giant pilaster strips, the outer ones rising above the roof line, a parapet, and a slate roof. There are three storeys, and an L-shaped plan, with a front of three bays, a rear wing, a single-storey two-bay extension on the left, and a single-bay extension to the right. The central doorway has a pointed head and a fanlight, to the left is a canted bay window with a hipped roof, most of the other windows are sashes, and in the right gable end is a window with an ogee head.	II
Drayton Brick Bridge; 52.59650°N 1.70859°W		c. 1787	The bridge carries a track over the Minworth to Fazeley branch of the Birmingham and Fazeley Canal. It is in red brick with stone coping, and consists of a single semicircular arch. The bridge has a plain parapet and stone end piers, and on the north side is a small round-headed doorway.	II
