= 1989 Irish Greyhound Derby =

1989 Respond Irish Greyhound Derby
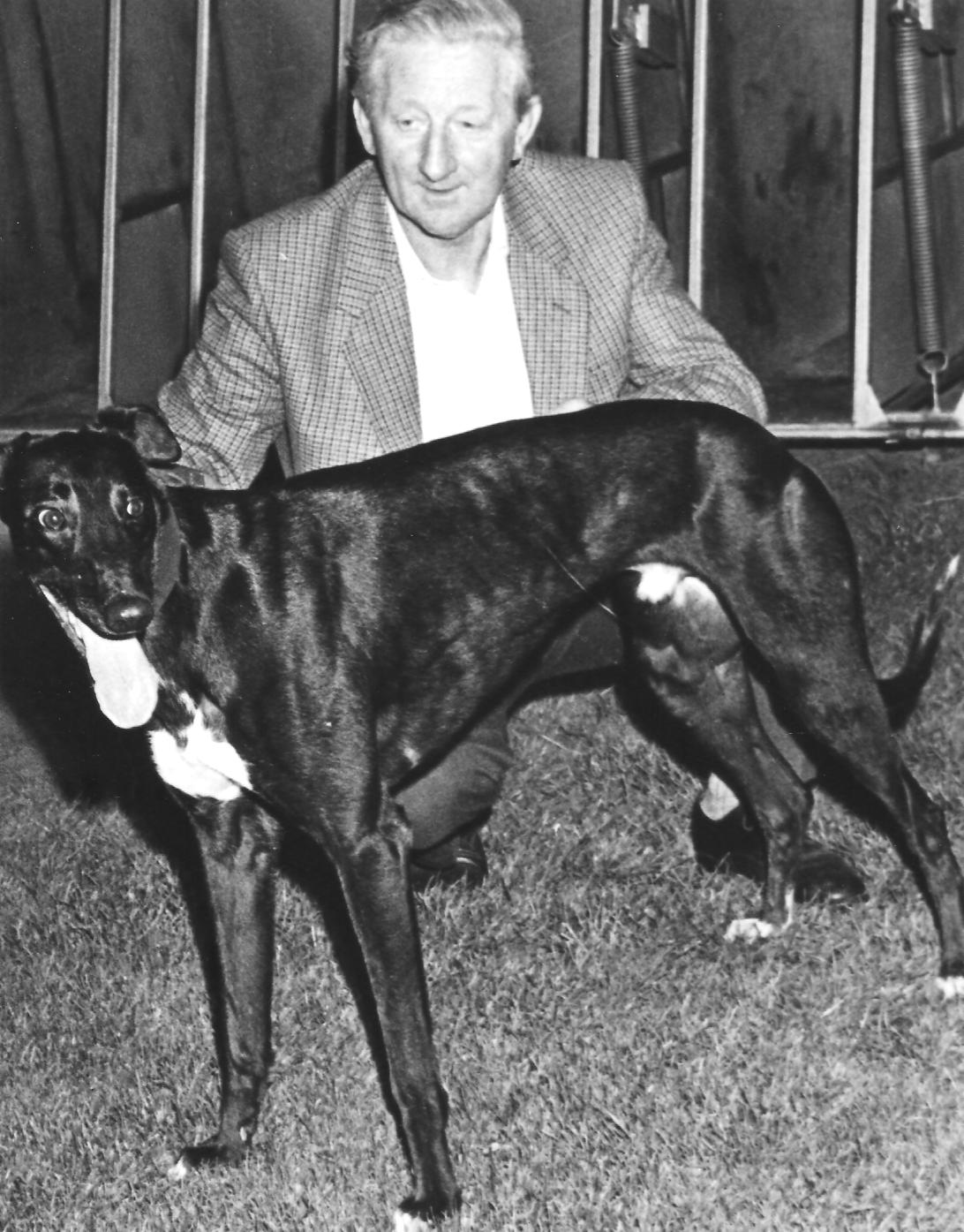
- Greyhound Manorville Magic with Christie Doran in 1989
- Venue: Shelbourne Park
- Location: Dublin
- End date: 16 September
- Total prize money: £30,000 (winner)

The 1989 Irish Greyhound Derby took place during August and September with the final being held at Shelbourne Park in Dublin on 16 September 1989.

The winner Manorville Magic won £30,000 and was trained by Paddy Doran, owned and bred by Catherine 'Kay' Doran. The race was sponsored by the Kerry Group's dog food product 'Respond'.

== Final result ==
At Shelbourne, 16 September (over 550 yards):

Position	Winner	Breeding	Trap	SP	Time	Trainer
1st	Manorville Magic	Manorville Sand - Black Vision	6	1-1f	30.53	Paddy Doran
2nd	Macs Lock	Quare Rocket - Killetra Queen	1	6-1	30.54	
3rd	Attractive Son	Very Attractive - Ballinamona Mum	3	7-1	30.57	Ger McKenna
4th	Yes Speedy	Curryhills Fox - Yes Mam	2	7-1	30.59	John 'Ginger' McGee Sr.
5th	Glenhill Jack	Oran Jack - Disco Clare	5	16-1	30.60	
6th	Dereen Star	Moral Support - Summer Crab	4	4-1	30.87	Matt O'Donnell

=== Distances ===
short-head, neck, head, short-head, 3¼ (lengths)

== Competition Report ==
The event was to feature a bizarre points system qualification, similar to the way the United States racing was held. It did not go down well with the racing public leaving punters bemused by the idea that greyhounds would qualify for the final on points. The points system lacked clarity with 15 points going down to one point being awarded to the finishing order in round one. All of the greyhounds then lined up in round two with the points system repeated. After round two the best 18 would contest the semi-finals which would be run over two rounds and then the top six would make the final.

The 1989 English Greyhound Derby champion Lartigue Note was the ante-post favourite but would face stiff opposition from 1988 Irish Greyhound Derby finalist Manorville Magic and Scottish Greyhound Derby champion Airmount Grand. The competition received a blow before it had even started when Lartigue Note who was trialing in preparation for the first round broke a hock and had to be retired.

Runs to note in the early rounds were Graciously's 30.09, just three spots off the track record but he did not accrue enough points to make the semi-finals. Manorville Magic and Airmount Grand both won twice before the semi-finals but the latter failed to gain enough points for a final place. In the two semi-finals Manorville Magic, Dereen Star and Attractive Son both gained double victories and led the points on 32. Yes Speedy was next with 28 and Glenhill Jack with 25 leaving one place available. Irish Sprint Cup champion Macs Lock and Deenside Spark both finished with 26 points, the former getting a final place by virtue of a faster time.

In the final Macs Lock led the race pursued closely by the field, Attractive Son challenged with Yes Speedy and Dereen Star still in contention. Then Manorville Magic came from fifth place to overtake the field and the leader Macs Lock by a short head with just one length covering the first five in a very competitive final.

== See also ==
- 1989 UK & Ireland Greyhound Racing Year
