= Fazeley Mill =

Industrial building in Fazeley, Staffordshire, England, built 1886

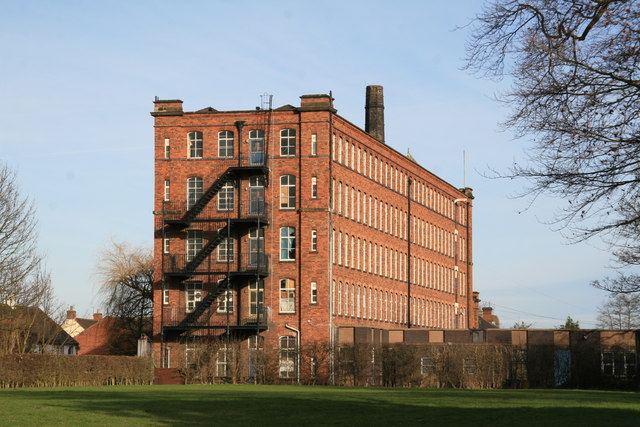
- Tolson’s Mill

- Location within Derbyshire

Smallware
- Alternative names: Tolson’s Mill, Fazeley

Mill
- Structural system: Brick
- Location: Fazeley, Staffordshire
- Serving canal: Birmingham and Fazeley Canal
- Owner: William Tolson
- Coordinates: 52°36′52.6″N 1°42′4.3″W

Construction
- Built: 1886; 140 years ago
- Floor count: 5
- Main contractor: Wattons of Lichfield

Design team
- Architecture Firm: Potts Pickup and Dixon of Manchester and Oldham

Equipment
- No. of looms: 200

Listed Building – Grade II
- Official name: Fazeley Mill
- Designated: 18 August 1997
- Reference no.: 1245134

Fazeley Mill is a Grade II listed industrial building built in 1886 for smallware production in Fazeley, Staffordshire.

== History ==
William Tolson (1814-1876) took over Sir Robert Peel’s Mill in 1843 to produce smallware (i.e. narrow tape and webbing). His two sons Richard Tolson (1851-1919) and William Watson Tolson (1857-1923) entered into partnership with their father and took over the business on his death.

The original factory in Mill Lane was destroyed by a fire on 25 January 1882 with damage estimated at £1,000 (equivalent to £104,009 in 2025).

The Tamworth Volunteer Fire Brigade attended the site of the new mill in 1883 to test their steam-powered fire engine. They ascertained that it could project water some distance higher than the top of the building.

The present building was constructed by Wattons of Lichfield on a new site adjacent to the Birmingham and Fazeley Canal. The main weaving block had a small engine house at the north end with an associated boiler house and chimney. The mill comprises a five storey block of 29 bays. The mill housed 200 looms and produced tapes for corsets, filleting for carpets, skirt webbing, boot laces and dress bandings.

The building remained in the ownership of the Tolson family until the early 20th century, but by this time it had been adapted for use by small industrial units. A later renovation of the building converted it into 51 apartments and 10 town houses.
