= 1963 UK & Ireland Greyhound Racing Year =

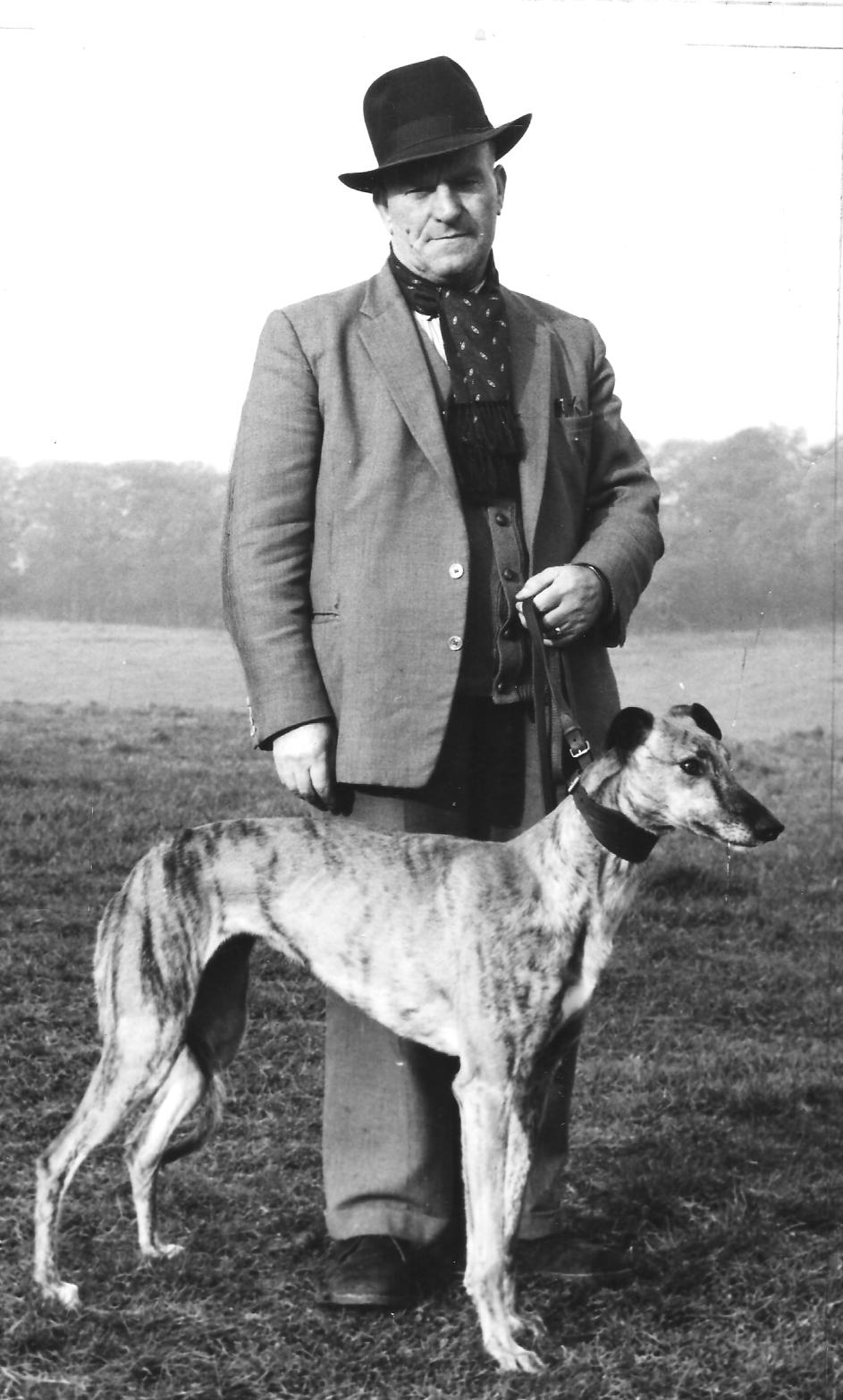
- Lucky Joan II (Scurry Gold Cup winner)

The 1963 UK & Ireland Greyhound Racing Year was the 38th year of greyhound racing in the United Kingdom and the 37th year of greyhound racing in Ireland.

== Roll of honour ==
Major Winners
Award	Name of Winner
1963 English Greyhound Derby	Lucky Boy Boy
1963 Irish Greyhound Derby	Drumahiskey Venture
1963 Scottish Greyhound Derby	We'll See
1963 Welsh Greyhound Derby	Fairys Chum
Greyhound Trainer of the Year	Tom Johnston Jr.
Greyhound of the Year	We'll See

== Summary ==
The Greyhound Afternoon Service was established whereby tracks supplied afternoon racing for the larger bookmaking clients. However the track promoters made a request for a guaranteed payment for the off course rights from all bookmakers taking bets from their stadium. Negotiations would continually take place between the stadiums, the National Greyhound Racing Society (NGRS) and the bookmakers. The problems had been ongoing since the introduction of the Betting and Gaming Act 1960. Clapton Stadiums Ltd owners of Clapton Stadium, Slough and Reading scrapped evening starting times in an attempt to disrupt the betting in bookmaker's shops. Tracks racing during the afternoon had already implemented this procedure. A further development resulted in the tracks ending the annual £100,000 agreement with the off course bookmakers to provide forecast and tricast tote odds. The bookmakers announced that they will provide their own odds based on starting prices.

Figures released by the NGRS showed a further decline in attendances and totalisator turnover, the first six months of 1963 showed attendances at 5,827,064 with turnover at £24,910,749 from 61 member tracks.

We'll See was voted Greyhound of the Year at the Silver Greyhound Awards, in the Great Room at the Grosvenor House Hotel. The brindle dog beat Cranog Bet to the crown, the latter had to settle for being named bitch of the year.

== Tracks ==
News broke at the beginning of the year that London Stadiums Ltd had future plans to redevelop Wandsworth Stadium into a shopping centre. Racing came to an end at Somerton Park in Newport, Wales, Clydeholm in Clydebank, Banister Court Stadium in Southampton and Hanley Greyhound Stadium. Two tracks opened at the Taff's Well and Milton Keynes.

== News ==
Alfred Critchley died on 9 February. Clapton hosted Pinewood Studios as they shot scenes for a new film starring Rita Tushingham and Mike Sarne called A Place to Go.

== Competitions ==
The Merit Puppy Championship held at Wimbledon was renamed and rebranded with more prize money, it would be called the Juvenile. The Gold Collar at Catford Stadium was won by Music Guest from Lucky Boy Boy, Irish Greyhound Derby champion Shanes Legacy finished last in the final and apart from winning the 1,000 Guineas would not live up to the expectations of his owner since his purchase from Ireland in 1962.

The 1962 greyhound of the year Dromin Glory had a Welsh Greyhound Derby campaign to forget, he weighed in too heavy in a trial and therefore another needed to be organised at short notice. He arrived late for kennelling for the second attempt, missing the deadline and as a result was not allowed to compete in the first round.

Curraheen Bride won the Sportsview TV Trophy at Wimbledon over 880 yards despite an attempt by a man to void the race after he jumped on to the track.

Leeds defeated Brighton in the final of the News of the World National Intertrack Championship.

== Ireland ==
Irish Greyhound Derby finalists both won major events in Ireland, Melody Wonder won the national Sprint held at the Dunmore Stadium and Powerstown Proper won the Laurels at Cork Greyhound Stadium.

In addition to the 10% government tax on off-course bets the Irish government introduce a further tax of 2.5% on all bets on-course and off-course.

== Principal UK races ==
Grand National, White City (April 27 525y h, £500)
Pos	Name of Greyhound	Trainer	SP	Time	Trap
1st	Indoor Sport	Barney O'Connor	4-5f	29.98	6
2nd	Sabena's Prince	Les Parry	8-1	30.28	1
3rd	Mood Indigo II		10-1	30.52	2
4th	Corsican Reward	Gordon Hodson	5-1	30.55	5
5th	Forever Corville	Dennis Hannafin	10-1	31.19	4
6th	Fairyfield Surprise	G.Jackson	11-2	31.59	3

The Grand Prix Walthamstow (May 7, 500y, £500)
Pos	Name of Greyhound	Trainer	SP	Time	Trap
1st	Monday's Ranger	Tom Reilly	4-5f	28.03	3
2nd	Adamstown Chief		100-8	28.31	2
3rd	Hi Longford	Tom Reilly	13-2	28.43	1
4th	Toasted		25-1	28.51	4
5th	Killinarden Wonder	Tom Reilly	11-4	28.67	6
6th	Nearly Blue		25-1	28.91	5

Gold Collar, Catford (May 18, 570y, £1,000)
Pos	Name of Greyhound	Trainer	SP	Time	Trap
1st	Music Guest	Tom Johnston Jr.	5-2	33.36	5
2nd	Lucky Boy Boy	John Bassett	2-1f	33.56	6
3rd	Brookville Genius	John Haynes	20-1	33.80	3
4th	Boula Rattler	Alf Forman	8-1	34.28	1
5th	Shannon Spirit	Phil Rees Sr.	3-1	34.32	4
6th	Shanes Legacy	Tony Dennis	6-1	34.96	2

Welsh Derby, Arms Park (Jul 6, 525y £500)
Pos	Name of Greyhound	Trainer	SP	Time	Trap
1st	Fairys Chum	Bob Burls	4-1	29.49	5
2nd	Crazy Peach	George Waterman	20-1	29.61	6
3rd	Some Edition	Tom Reilly	8-1	29.62	2
4th	Cahara Rover	Joe De Mulder	4-5f	29.66	4
5th	Fitzs Hall	Tom Reilly	3-1	29.92	1
6th	Darn Hall	Bob Burls	33-1	30.08	3

Oaks, Harringay (Jul 8, 525y, £500)
Pos	Name of Greyhound	Trainer	SP	Time	Trap
1st	Cranog Bet	Phil Rees Sr.	7-2	29.31	4
2nd	Witching Flare	Jim Singleton	10-1	29.59	2
3rd	Hack It About	Jack Harvey	13-8f	29.67	5
4th	Right on Time		10-1	29.75	1
5th	Shady Mermaiden	Phil Rees Sr.	4-1	29.99	3
6th	Beauties Dash		7-1	30.05	6

Scurry Gold Cup, Clapton (Jul 20, 400y £1,000)
Pos	Name of Greyhound	Trainer	SP	Time	Trap
1st	Lucky Joan II	John Bassett	3-1	22.70	2
2nd	Orange Grove II	Stan Gudgin	25-1	23.04	3
3rd	Cranog Bet	Phil Rees Sr.	5-2	23.10	1
4th	Misty King	Phil Rees Sr.	100-8	23.38	6
5th	Larrys Model	Bill Kelly	6-4f	23.50	5
6th	Bulgaden Glory	Clare Orton	6-1	23.68	4

Laurels, Wimbledon (Aug 17, 500y, £1,000)
Pos	Name of Greyhound	Trainer	SP	Time	Trap
1st	Dalcassian Son	A.G.Hiscock	7-2	28.08	2
2nd	Coup Leader	Clare Orton	5-1	28.22	5
3rd	Badge of Flame	Jack Harvey	100-8	28.28	3
4th	Lucky Hi There	Jimmy Jowett	10-3	28.42	6
5th	Cranog Bet	Phil Rees Sr.	9-2	28.52	4
6th	Dancing Point	(Clare Orton)	11-4	28.53	1

St Leger, Wembley (Sep 2, 700y, £1,000)
Pos	Name of Greyhound	Trainer	SP	Time	Trap
1st	Friendly Lass	Tony Dennis	2-1	40.15	6
2nd	Massan	Jack Kinsley	11-10f	40.31	1
3rd	Crazy Peach	George Waterman	8-1	40.87	3
4th	Strelka	Jim Irving	5-1	41.27	4
5th	Prairie Kim		100-6	41.49	2
N/R	Leinster Elm	Percy Stagg			5

Scottish Greyhound Derby, Carntyne (Sep 7, 525y, £750)
Pos	Name of Greyhound	Trainer	SP	Time	Trap
1st	We'll See	Tom Johnston Jr.	4-6f	28.91	5
2nd	Fairys Chum	Bob Burls	3-1	28.97	1
3rd	Free Hand		12-1	29.45	2
4th	Lowfield King	P.O'Loughlin	4-1	29.93	4
5th	Super Car	Norman Oliver	16-1	30.17	6
6th	Better Fame		20-1	30.49	3

Cesarewitch, West Ham (Oct 4, 600y, £1,000)
Pos	Name of Greyhound	Trainer	SP	Time	Trap
1st	Jehu II	Gordon Hodson	9-4	33.15	1
2nd	Music Guest	Tom Johnston Jr.	8-1	33.35	5
3rd	Jamaica Inn	Paddy McEllistrim	13-2	33.47	2
4th	Lucky Boy Boy	John Bassett	6-4f	33.67	3
5th	Melting Moments	Jimmy Clubb	100-8	33.91	6
6th	Hi Over	Harry Bamford	9-2	34.13	4

== Totalisator returns ==
Extended content

The totalisator returns declared to the licensing authorities for the year 1963 are listed below.

Stadium	Turnover £
London (White City)	5,078,429
London (Harringay)	3,423,534
London (Wimbledon)	2,616,204
London (Walthamstow)	2,319,869
London (Wembley)	2,064,260
London (Clapton)	1,879,908
London (Catford)	1,720,985
London (West Ham)	1,640,886
Manchester (Belle Vue)	1,619,512
London (Wandsworth)	1,553,757
London (Stamford Bridge)	1,225,670
London (New Cross)	1,144,929
London (Hendon)	1,133,813
London (Park Royal)	1,113,066
Romford	1,019,608
Manchester (White City)	996,340
Edinburgh (Powderhall)	992,423
London (Hackney)	956,170
Glasgow (Shawfield)	882,206

Stadium	Turnover £
Birmingham (Perry Barr, old)	865,861
Brighton & Hove	813,461
Slough	753,619
Birmingham (Hall Green)	725,000
Glasgow (White City)	672,829
Leeds (Elland Road)	671,758
Southend-on-Sea	654,848
Crayford & Bexleyheath	629,005
Manchester (Salford)	588,576
London (Dagenham)	584,491
Newcastle (Brough Park)	580,551
Bristol (Eastville)	553,955
Wolverhampton (Monmore)	553,300
Newcastle (Gosforth)	532,054
Bradford (Greenfield)	483,010
Willenhall	482,746
Sheffield (Owlerton)	471,016
Ramsgate (Dumpton Park)	467,721
Birmingham (Kings Heath)	455,751

Stadium	Turnover £
Reading (Oxford Road)	448,370
Cardiff (Arms Park)	428,326
Gloucester & Cheltenham	396,043
Glasgow (Carntyne)	388,602
Derby	324,845
Oxford	280,837
Middlesbrough	278,777
Gateshead	270,199
Rochester & Chatham	267,768
Hull (Old Craven Park)	247,892
Aberdeen	234,080
Nottingham (White City)	224,319
Leicester (Blackbird Rd)	219,574
Poole	218,065
South Shields	214,391
Preston	198,362
Portsmouth	150,685
Norwich (City)	103,588
