= 1989 UK & Ireland Greyhound Racing Year =

UK greyhound racing year

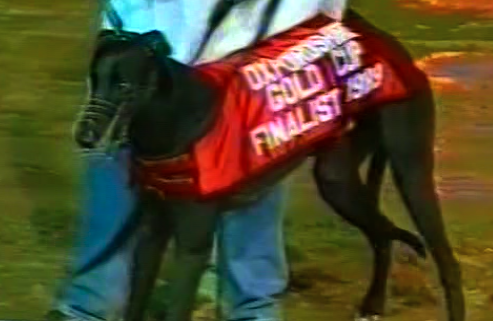

The 1989 UK & Ireland Greyhound Racing Year was the 64th year of greyhound racing in the United Kingdom and the 63rd year of greyhound racing in Ireland.

== Roll of honour ==
Major Winners
Award	Name of Winner
1989 English Greyhound Derby	Lartigue Note
1989 Irish Greyhound Derby	Manorville Magic
1989 Scottish Greyhound Derby	Airmount Grand
Greyhound Trainer of the Year	John McGee Sr.
Greyhound of the Year	Waltham Abbey
Irish Greyhound of the Year	Manorville Magic
Trainers Championship	John McGee Sr.

== Summary ==
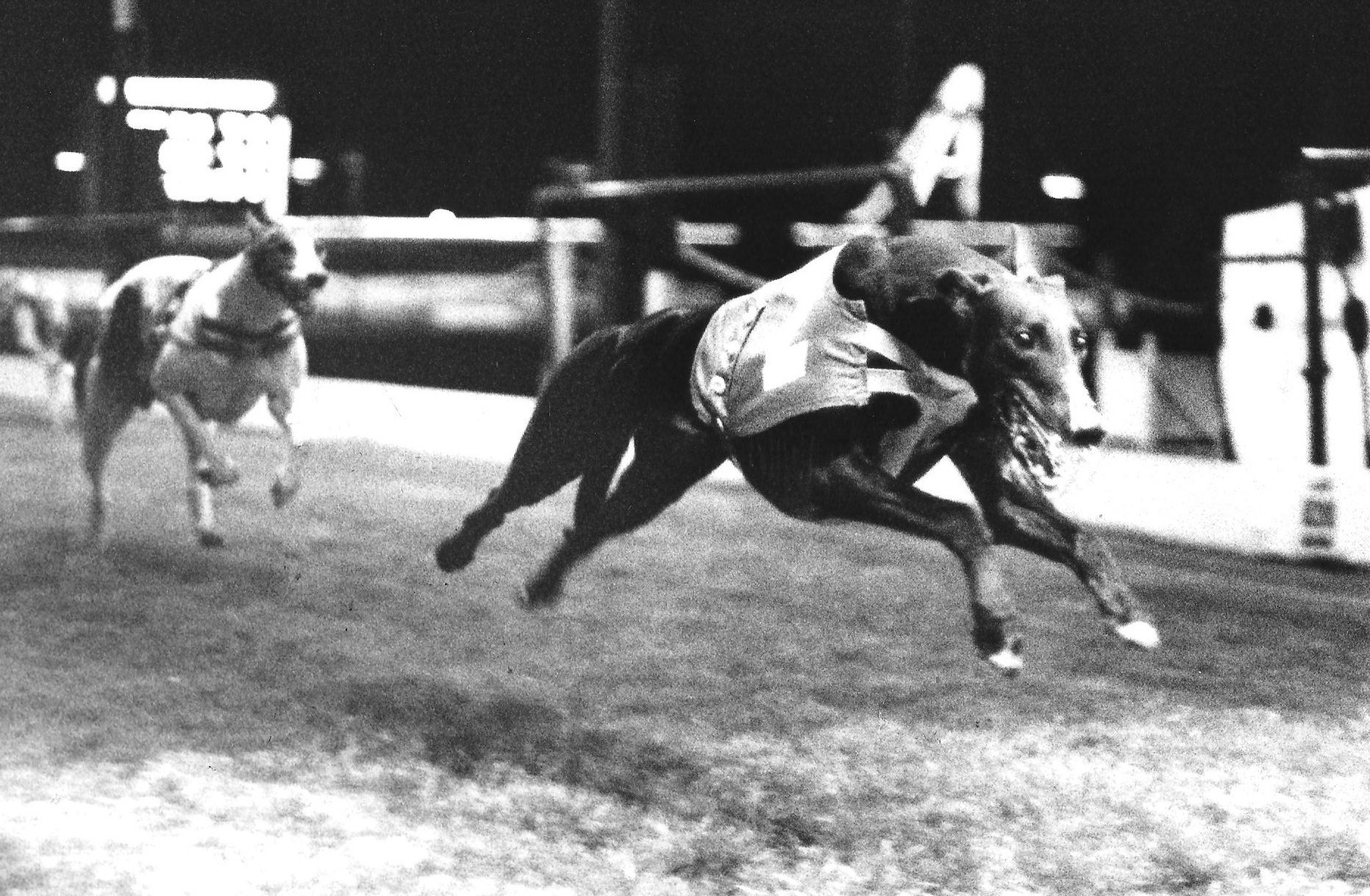
Waltham Abbey breaks the track record at Walthamstow during the Grand Prix

The National Greyhound Racing Club (NGRC) released the annual returns, with totalisator turnover at £106,011,494 and attendances recorded at 4,395,973 from 5477 meetings.

John McGee won the Greyhound Trainer of the Year for the second successive year. Waltham Abbey now trained by Ernie Gaskin (formerly Adam Jackson) was voted Greyhound of the Year after winning the Grand Prix at Walthamstow Stadium. The award failed to go the winners of a Derby due to the fact that all three were won by the Irish; they were the 1989 English Greyhound Derby (Lartigue Note), the 1989 Scottish Greyhound Derby (Airmount Grand) and the 1989 Irish Greyhound Derby (Manorville Magic), the latter was voted Irish Greyhound of the Year.

== Tracks ==
The Greyhound Racing Association (GRA} invested £1 million into Hall Green, mainly extending the restaurant. The Peterborough management also unveiled their new raceview restaurant costing £500,000. Terry Corden sold the Sheffield lease; he was forced to do so after the council closed the stadium due to new safety measures. This was as a direct result of the Hillsborough disaster.

Hull (New Craven Park) and Hawick both opened for racing.

== Competitions ==
The Scottish Derby returned to Glasgow (as a consequence of GRA having no stadia in Scotland), the event received a boost when Ladbrokes stepped in and sponsored the competition. Racing Manager Robert Lithgow was forced to increase the entries from 24 to 36 due to its popularity. The event resulted in what many regarded the best ever when Airmount Grand caught Galtymore Lad on the finish line after both vied for the lead throughout.

Trainer Phil Rees Jr. won the Grand National at Hall Green with Lemon Chip, this was the kennels first Grand National success despite previously winning six Springbok titles. Fearless Ace made a remarkable comeback when winning the Pall Mall Stakes for a second successive year; the fawn dog had won the 1988 final for Geoff De Mulder before being retired to stud. He returned a year later to defend his title under the training of Theo Mentzis after coming out of retirement and not only stormed to a surprise victory but broke the Oxford track record in the final.

== News ==
Brent Walker owners of Hackney took over William Hill and Mecca Bookmakers from Grand Metropolitan for £685 million. Canterbury obtained a Bookmakers Afternoon Greyhound Service (BAGS) contract and Wisbech began the year under NGRC rules.

Veteran trainer Hugo Spencer retired and John Coleman moved to Walthamstow. Walthamstow also produced one race meeting tote turnover of £173,000 on the night of the Pepsi Cola Marathon final.

Trainer Linda Jones and her husband Doug moved to Lakenheath and formed the Imperial Kennels. They started with four racing greyhounds and a couple of litters of pups set in the Suffolk countryside. The kennel would quickly establish themselves on the local tracks of Swaffham, Mildenhall and Yarmouth.

Owner John Dooley visited a stud kennel in County Cork to find it abandoned and his Blue Riband champion Lulus Hero missing, the brindle dog is never found.

Champion trainer John McGee and owner Fred Smith had an argument that resulted in Derby champion Hit The Lid leaving the kennels.

== Principal UK races ==
Daily Mirror Grand National, Hall Green (April 1, 474m h, £3,000)
Pos	Name of Greyhound	Trainer	SP	Time	Trap
1st	Lemon Chip	Philip Rees Jr.	1-1f	29.84	5
2nd	Blazing Home	Philip Rees Jr.	3-1	29.85	1
3rd	Gizmo Pasha	Linda Mullins	9-1	29.91	6
4th	Columbkille Jet	Paddy Hancox	6-1	29.97	2
5th	Indianna Scarlet	Terry O'Sullivan	14-1	30.00	3
6th	Belmore Captain	Tom Foster	14-1	30.34	4

BBC TV Trophy, Catford (April 11, 850m, £8,000)
Pos	Name of Greyhound	Trainer	SP	Time	Trap
1st	Proud To Run	Harry White	4-5f	55.25+	4
2nd	Catunda Flame	Russ Kinsey	6-1	55.95	2
3rd	Jet Streamer		10-1	56.15	5
4th	Clydes Dolores		8-1	56.43	3
5th	Manx Sky	Ernie Gaskin Sr.	16-1	56.71	6
6th	Dunait		7-1	56.81	1

+Track Record

Ladbrokes Scottish Derby, Shawfield (May 13, 500m, £10,000)
Pos	Name of Greyhound	Trainer	SP	Time	Trap
1st	Airmount Grand	Gerald Kiely	1-1f	30.03	6
2nd	Galtymore Lad	Geoff De Mulder	6-4	30.07	4
3rd	Atlantic Jet	Harry Crapper	7-1	30.25	1
4th	Alley Bally	Terry Dartnall	8-1	30.33	2
5th	Arrow House	Bryce Wilson	12-1	30.53	3
N/R	Decoy Regan Lass	Kevin Cobbold			

Scurry Gold Cup, Catford (Jul 16, 385m, £6,000)
Pos	Name of Greyhound	Trainer	SP	Time	Trap
1st	Nans Brute	Bill Masters	16-1	23.59	3
2nd	Angelo Carlotti	Terry Munslow	10-1	23.73	2
3rd	Lissadell Tiger	Ernie Gaskin Sr.	5-1	23.77	6
4th	Pure Gold	Bill Masters	10-1	23.78	5
5th	Pretty Magic	David Ingram-Seal	10-1	23.86	4
6th	Hello Blackie	Roger York	4-6f	24.06	1

John Humphreys Gold Collar, Catford (Sep 16, 555m, £6,000)
Pos	Name of Greyhound	Trainer	SP	Time	Trap
1st	Burgess Ruby	Arthur Boyce	7/2	34.72	1
2nd	Fennessys Gold	Ray Peacock	7/4f		
?	Risky Friend	Dinky Luckhurst			
?	Festival Wonder	John McGee Sr.			
?	Peaceful Spring				
?	Sard	John McGee Sr.			

John Smith's Bitter Cesarewitch, Belle Vue (Sep 23, 853m, £3,000)
Pos	Name of Greyhound	Trainer	SP	Time	Trap
1st	Minnies Siren	Kenny Linzell	5-4f	56.03	6
2nd	Saquita	Dennis Jewell	4-1	56.06	5
3rd	Catunda Flame	Russ Kinsey	9-4	56.12	2
4th	Manx Jet	Nigel Saunders	10-1	56.32	4
5th	Spring Flower	Linda Mullins	20-1	56.50	3
6th	Benedene Rose	Peter Payne	10-1	56.53	1

Laurent-Perrier Grand Prix, Walthamstow (Oct 7, 640m, £7,500)
Pos	Name of Greyhound	Trainer	SP	Time	Trap
1st	Waltham Abbey	Ernie Gaskin Sr.	2-1	39.91	4
2nd	Chicita Banana	John McGee Sr.	7-4f	39.99	5
3rd	Hello Blackie	Roger York	16-1	40.05	1
4th	Sard	John McGee Sr.	9-1	40.47	2
5th	Hot Fluff	Arthur Hitch	8-1	40.51	3
6th	Exile Energy	Gary Baggs	8-1	40.81	6

St Georges Hospital Oaks, Wimbledon (Oct 28, 480m, £6,000)
Pos	Name of Greyhound	Trainer	SP	Time	Trap
1st	Nice And Lovely	Derek Tidswell	9-4	29.02	6
2nd	Glengiblin Flash	T Batterbee	8-1	29.18	4
3rd	Nans Brute	Bill Masters	2-1f	29.19	2
4th	Crohane Lucy	Tony Lucas	5-1	29.22	1
5th	Blend of Magic	Molly Redpath	8-1	29.38	5
6th	Alley Bally	Terry Dartnall	5-1	29.50	3

St Leger, Wembley (Nov 17, 655m, £8,000)
Pos	Name of Greyhound	Trainer	SP	Time	Trap
1st	Manx Marajax	Nigel Saunders	33-1	39.87	5
2nd	Chiltern Sarah	Peggy Cope	16-1	39.93	4
3rd	Trans Mercedes	Mal Thomas	5-2	39.99	1
4th	Crohane Lucy	Tony Lucas	11-4	40.09	2
5th	Chicita Banana	John McGee Sr.	2-1f	40.29	6
6th	Murlens Panther	Geoff De Mulder	6-1	40.47	3

Ike Morris Laurels, Wimbledon (Dec 23, 460m, £6,000)
Pos	Name of Greyhound	Trainer	SP	Time	Trap
1st	Parquet Pal	Arthur Hitch	9-4	27.68	2
2nd	Daring Duke	John Honeysett	7-1	27.84	1
3rd	Westmead Havoc	Natalie Savva	14-1	27.88	4
4th	Yes Speedy	John McGee Sr.	7-4f	27.89	3
5th	Glenvale Boy	Geoff De Mulder	7-1	27.90	5
6th	Slippy Blue	Kenny Linzell	5-1	27.94	6

== Totalisator returns ==
Extended content

The totalisator returns declared to the National Greyhound Racing Club for the year 1989 are listed below.

Stadium	Turnover £
London (Wimbledon)	17,438,359
London (Walthamstow)	16,850,422
Romford	8,996,109
Brighton & Hove	6,970,118
London (Catford)	6,691,913
London (Wembley)	6,214,683
Birmingham (Hall Green)	4,845,618
Manchester (Belle Vue)	4,280,189
Crayford	3,417,124
Glasgow (Shawfield)	2,514,013
Oxford	2,506,820
Edinburgh (Powderhall)	2,371,036

Stadium	Turnover £
Newcastle (Brough Park)	1,838,238
Wolverhampton (Monmore)	1,838,238
Ramsgate	1,794,750
Portsmouth	1,651,827
Sheffield (Owlerton)	1,7585,835
Yarmouth	1,559,435
Reading	1,505,614
Canterbury	1,454,069
Milton Keynes	1,202,379
Swindon	1,971,192
Bristol	957,478
Peterborough	946,531

Stadium	Turnover £
Rye House	938,460
Henlow (Bedfordshire)	727,060
London (Hackney)	664,180
Poole	613,961
Middlesbrough	431,466
Cradley Heath	414,914
Swaffham	411,000
Norton Canes	371,877
Nottingham	371,877
Hull (Old Craven Park)	267,303
Wisbech	46,237
