= 1963 English Greyhound Derby =

- Location: White City Stadium
- Start date: 15 June
- End date: 29 June
- Total prize money: £3,000 (winner)

The 1963 Greyhound Derby took place during June with the final being held on 29 June 1963 at White City Stadium. The winner was Lucky Boy Boy and the owner Stan Barrett received £3,000.

== Final result ==
At White City (over 525 yards):

Position	Name of Greyhound	Breeding	Trap	SP	Time	Trainer
1st	Lucky Boy Boy	Super Man - Grange Maiden	1	1-1f	29.00	John Bassett (Clapton)
2nd	Greenane Wonder	Hi There - Prairie Peg	2	4-1	29.54	Jack Harvey (Wembley)
3rd	Barronstown King	Jakfigaralt - Eileen's Neighbour	6	25-1	29.62	Clare Orton (Wimbledon)
4th	Hack It About	Solar Prince - Hack About	3	4-1	30.58	Jack Harvey (Wembley)
5th	Misty King	Duet Leader - Shiralee	5	8-1	30.78	John Bassett (Clapton)
6th	Bulgaden Glory	Super Man - Airways Biddy	4	20-1	30.88	John Haynes (Private)

=== Distances ===
6¾, 1, 12, 2½, 1¼ (lengths)
The distances between the greyhounds are in finishing order and shown in lengths. From 1950 one length was equal to 0.08 of one second.

== Competition report ==
Dromin Glory returned for another edition of the Derby and headed the ante-post betting based on his form from the previous year. Trainer John Bassett trained two more leading contenders called Misty King and Gold Collar runner up Lucky Boy Boy. Trainer Bessie Lewis travelled down from her Scottish kennels with a greyhound Called Crazy Platinum, a son of Crazy Parachute.

The first round resulted in three greyhounds quoted at 250-1 and 500-1 ante-post winning heats and Dromin Glory failed to qualify after a poor run. Dual Derby finalist Black July went out in round two but consolation for John Bassett came with Lucky Boy Boy who was successful in both the heats and second round. Dalcassian Son also won in the heats and second round. Misty King and Greenane Wonder both won, the latter in a heat that ended with the disqualification of Lowerton Hero.

The opening semi-final went to a 20-1 shot Bulgaden Glory from Barronstown King and Misty King in a race marred by trouble that led to the elimination of Dalcassian Son. A cleaner and much closer second semi-final ended with Greenane Wonder edging out Hack It About by a short head with Lucky Boy Boy holding on for the third and final qualification spot by a short head from Irish challenger Jamie Serra. Gold Collar champion Music Guest's campaign also came to an end at this stage.

Although Lucky Boy Boy lost his unbeaten record in the semi-finals the bookmakers gave him a starting price of even money favourite for the final. Greenane Wonder was fast out the traps and moved wide at the first bend as he had throughout the competition and this caused Bulgaden Glory and Misty King to be bumped leaving them with no chance to qualify. Lucky Boy Boy took advantage of the trouble and went on to win by six and three quarter lengths.

== See also ==
- 1963 UK & Ireland Greyhound Racing Year
