= Garth Stadium =

Greyhound racing track in Taff's Well, Wales

- Location: Taff's Well, near Cardiff, Wales

Construction
- Opened: 1963

The Garth Stadium is a former greyhound racing track in Taff's Well, near Cardiff, Wales.

The greyhound track in Taff's Well was to be found to the North East of the village and opened on 23 September 1963.

Racing was held on Wednesday and Friday evenings at 7.30pm and amenities included a licensed bar. The track circuit circumference was 400 yards consisting of distances of 300, 525 and 715 yards. The racing was independent (unaffiliated to a governing body) and the hare system was an 'Inside Sumner' with photo finish installed. The promoters of the stadium were Hawthorn Greyhounds Ltd which possibly indicates that it was the same management team that ran the Hawthorn Greyhound Track.

The stadium was short-lived and is now the Rhiw'r Ddar housing estate close to Taff's Well football ground.
