= 1989 English Greyhound Derby =

1989 English greyhound race

- Location: Wimbledon Stadium
- End date: 24 June
- Total prize money: £40,000 (winner)

The 1989 Daily Mirror Greyhound Derby took place during May and June with the final being held on 24 June 1989 at Wimbledon Stadium. The winner was Lartigue Note and the winning owner Cathal McCarthy received £40,000. The competition was sponsored by the Daily Mirror.

== Final result ==
At Wimbledon (over 480 metres):

Position	Name of Greyhound	Breeding	Trap	SP	Time	Trainer
1st	Lartigue Note	One to Note - Lartigue Spark	2	1-1f	28.79	Ger McKenna (Ireland)
2nd	Kilcannon Bullet	Odell Supreme - Murlens Toe	6	2-1	29.21	John Coleman (Walthamstow)
3rd	Castleivy Mick	Moral Support - Rambling Florist	1	10-1	29.24	Freda Greenacre (Private)
4th	Early Vocation	Manorville Sand - Chick Luck	5	10-1	29.42	John Honeysett (Wembley)
5th	Cooladine Style	Easy and Slow - Cooladine Dove	3	25-1	29.50	Paul Stringer (Norton Canes)
6th	Catsrock Rocket	Lauragh Six - Busy Bubble	4	7-1	29.68	Bill O'Hare (Private)

=== Distances ===
5¼, neck, 2¼, 1, 2¼ (lengths)
The distances between the greyhounds are in finishing order and shown in lengths. One length is equal to 0.08 of one second.

== Competition Report ==
The Daily Mirror sponsored the Derby for the eighth consecutive year and Ireland's top trainer Ger McKenna sent the leading contenders headed by Attractive Son, Lartigue Note and ante-post favourite Lodge Dancer. The main British hope came from Laurels champion and English Greyhound Derby finalist Comeragh Boy and the defending champion Hit the Lid.

In qualifying Lodge Dancer and Slippy Blue both went out with Comeragh Boy also eliminated after finishing lame. Galtymore Lad and defending champion Hit the Lid both went out in round one after encountering interference; in addition leading hopes Arrow House and Fergus Bramley both finished lame.

Lartigue Note won in a fast 28.50 in round two to remain unbeaten but Ard Knock and Wendys Dream were two high-profile casualties.

The quarter-finals looked vastly different from the predicted ante-post betting before the competition began. Lartigue Note won again but kennelmate Attractive Son failed to progress. Early Vocation and Guiding Hope gave John Honeysett a double with Terminator being the fourth quarter-final victor.

By the semi-final stage Lartigue Note was clear favourite but failed to win the messy race losing out to Catsrock Rocket who held off the slow starting Irish hound. In the second semi Kilcannon Bullet won easily from Early Vocation and Cooladine Super who had caught the fading Terminator for third place. Favourite Kildare Ash disappointed.

Ger McKenna's belief that Lartigue Note could win the final from any trap was justified because he broke well and drew clear of the field to win comfortably by 5¼ lengths from Kilcannon Bullet.

== See also ==
- 1989 UK & Ireland Greyhound Racing Year
