= Fazeley =

Town in Staffordshire, England

Coordinates: 52.6150°N 1.6996°W

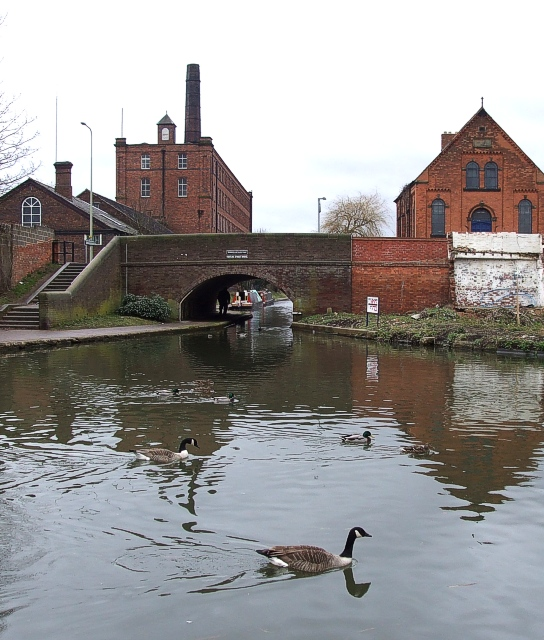
- Fazeley Junction

- Location within Staffordshire
- Population: 4,616 (2021 census)
- OS grid reference: SK2002
- Civil parish: Fazeley
- District: Lichfield
- Shire county: Staffordshire
- Region: West Midlands
- Country: England
- Sovereign state: United Kingdom
- Post town: TAMWORTH
- Postcode district: B78
- Dialling code: 01827
- Police: Staffordshire
- Fire: Staffordshire
- Ambulance: West Midlands
- UK Parliament: Tamworth

Fazeley is a small industrial town and civil parish in the Lichfield District of Staffordshire, England, slightly southwest of Tamworth. The civil parish includes Mile Oak and the hamlet of Bonehill, and at the 2021 census had a population of 4,616. Fazeley forms part of the Tamworth built-up area.

It sits astride the junction of the Birmingham and Fazeley Canal and Coventry Canal; at Fazeley Junction are a couple of multi storey mills. Fazeley is also adjacent to Drayton Manor, formerly the home of Robert Peel and now a theme park and zoo.

Fazeley is also the home of Coton Green Football Club, located on the border of the Drayton Bassett parish.

== History ==
The name Fazeley in its various spellings is found in documents dating back to 1135. The name Fazeley derives from the Old English fearrslēah meaning 'bull wood or clearing'.

The hamlet of Bonehill developed to support the home of Sir Robert Peel MP - Bonehill house. Bonehill originally consisted of farm buildings and horse breeding (stud farm) facilities to support the Peels interests.

In May 1861 a new library and reading room was opened when the “The Bold Hussar” beer shop was converted.

Children were originally educated in a small two-floor building in Mill Lane connected to St Paul’s Church. In 1862 a new school paid for by Robert Peel was erected at a cost of £1,400 (equivalent to £147,178 in 2025) opposite St Paul’s Church to the designs of the architect John Henry Chamberlain.

The First Annual Fazeley Festival and Mile Oak Mile Charity hop took place on 15 September 2007.

== Fazeley Town Hall ==
In the centre of the town, Fazeley Town Hall was originally named the Victoria Memorial Hall, commemorating the diamond jubilee of Queen Victoria. It was designed by the architect T.H. Thorpe of Derby. James Eadie paid for both the cost of its construction, £3,000 (equivalent to £337,132 in 2025), and the land on which it stands: it was completed in 1898.

Eadie intended that the Hall should benefit the inhabitants of Fazeley and help to promote their welfare. His vision was that the Hall would be used for public meetings, lectures and concerts and contain reading rooms and speculated that technical classes might some day be held "for the better training of workmen in their several crafts and industries." The vision became a reality; meetings of all descriptions took place and winter entertainments were regularly well attended. There was a library and a reading room, classes were held in gymnastics and cookery, and an Evening Continuation School in horticulture attracted over 40 youngsters. In later years, silent movies were presented here, too.

Originally the Town Hall contained a tower with a public clock. This was removed in 1985 when in a £51,000 (equivalent to £157,959 in 2025) scheme, the front of the hall was revamped and the roof lowered.

== Fazeley War Memorial ==
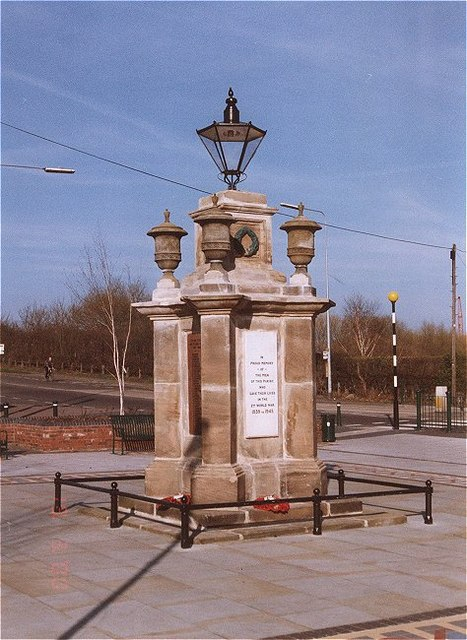
The memorial having been relocated in 1999

The war memorial in the square at Fazeley was dedicated on 25 July 1920 in a ceremony attended by the Tamworth Territorials and the band of the Oxford and Bucks Light Infantry. The contractor for the memorial was Charles Mitchell of Tamworth, with the lamp supplied by the Tamworth Gas Company. The memorial cost £417 10s. 5d. (equivalent to £16,134 in 2025) which was raised by public subscription.

The memorial took the form of a mass of Hollington stone in the form of a cenotaph, 22 feet 9 inches (6.93 m) high from the roadway to the top of the lamp, and stood on a bed of concrete 13 feet (4.0 m) square. The monument stood on a flight of three steps and was a square structure with angle buttresses, capped by a deeply projecting cornice. The buttresses terminated with four stone urns immediately over the cornice, and in the centre of the upper portion is an empanelled stone bearing four wreaths of laurel carved on each face. Surmounting the memorial was a wrought-iron scroll carrying the three light gas lamp. On the north and south faces, two polished Balmoral red granite tablets recorded the inscription and the names of 30 men fallen during the conflict.

In 1936 the war memorial was surrounded by a traffic island due to improvements made by public works contractors to improve traffic flow.

Following the Second World War two white marble plaques were placed on the memorial by stonemason R.T. Rollason.

In the 1950s it was moved to the St Paul’s Church yard and in 1999 moved back close to its original location in a new memorial square near the public hall.

== Religion ==
=== Church of England ===
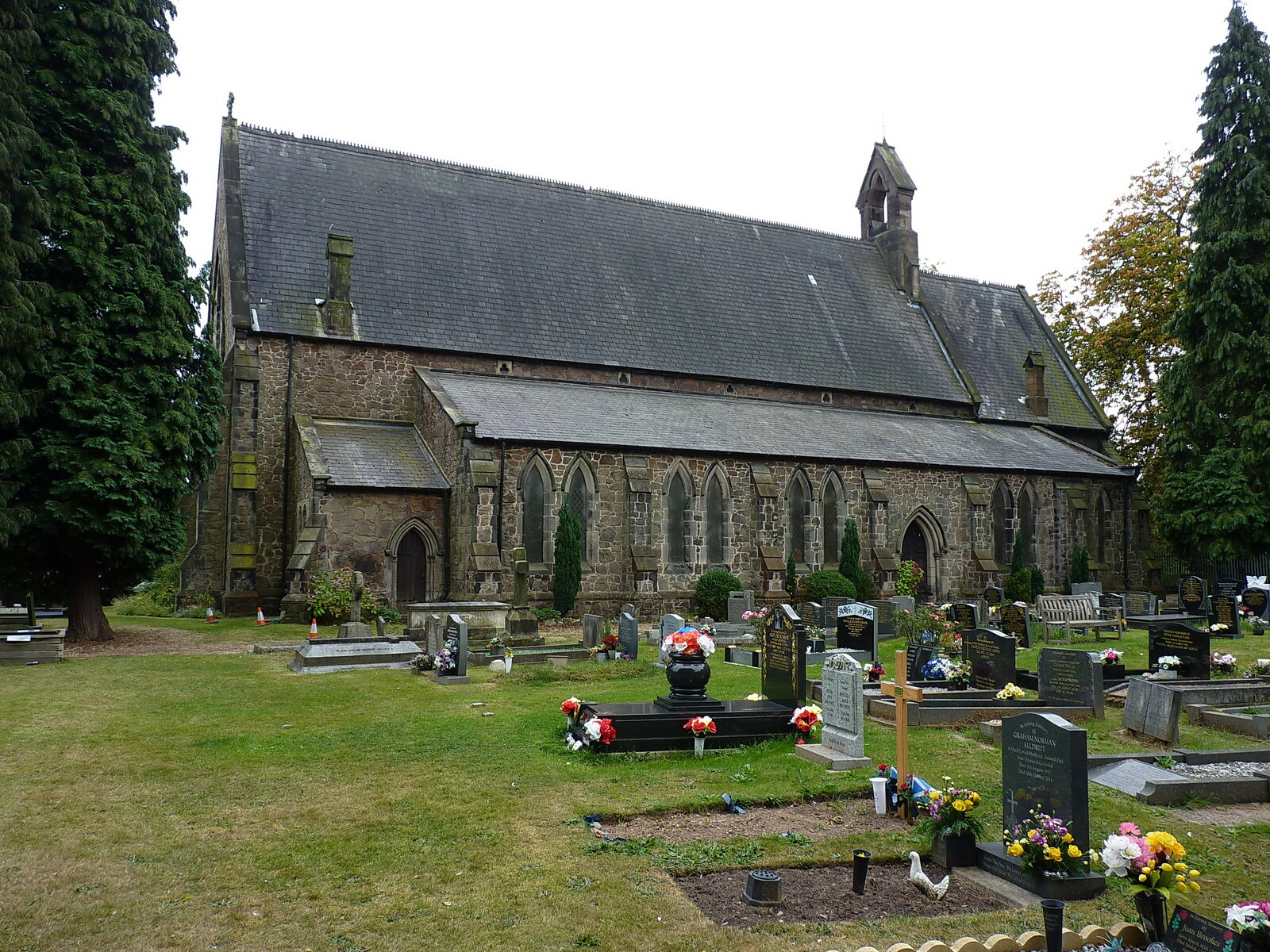
St Paul's Church, Fazeley

St Paul’s Church, Fazeley was built in 1810 as a chapel of ease for Tamworth constructed by Robert Peel.

It was rebuilt between 1853 and 1855 to the designs of the Derby architect Henry Isaac Stevens at a cost of £2,500 (equivalent to £232,782 in 2025). The contractors were Messrs Lilley of Measham, Leicestershire.

The church is 107 feet 3 inches (32.69 m) long, 54 feet 2 inches (16.51 m) broad and 50 feet (15 m) high to the parapet.

A pipe organ was installed in the nineteenth century and enlarged in 1869 by Harston’s of Newark. It was cleaned and overhauled in 1923 by Lloyd of Nottingham when it received new Gamba pipes.

A new instrument comprising two manuals and pedals with 13 speaking stops was installed by Conacher, Sheffield and Co., Ltd of Birmingham in memory of Mr. J. Harling Jones, schoolmaster of the village. It was dedicated by the Bishop of Lichfield on 11 January 1931. A specification of this organ can be found on the National Pipe Organ Register. This organ was destroyed and broken up in 1994.

=== Methodist ===
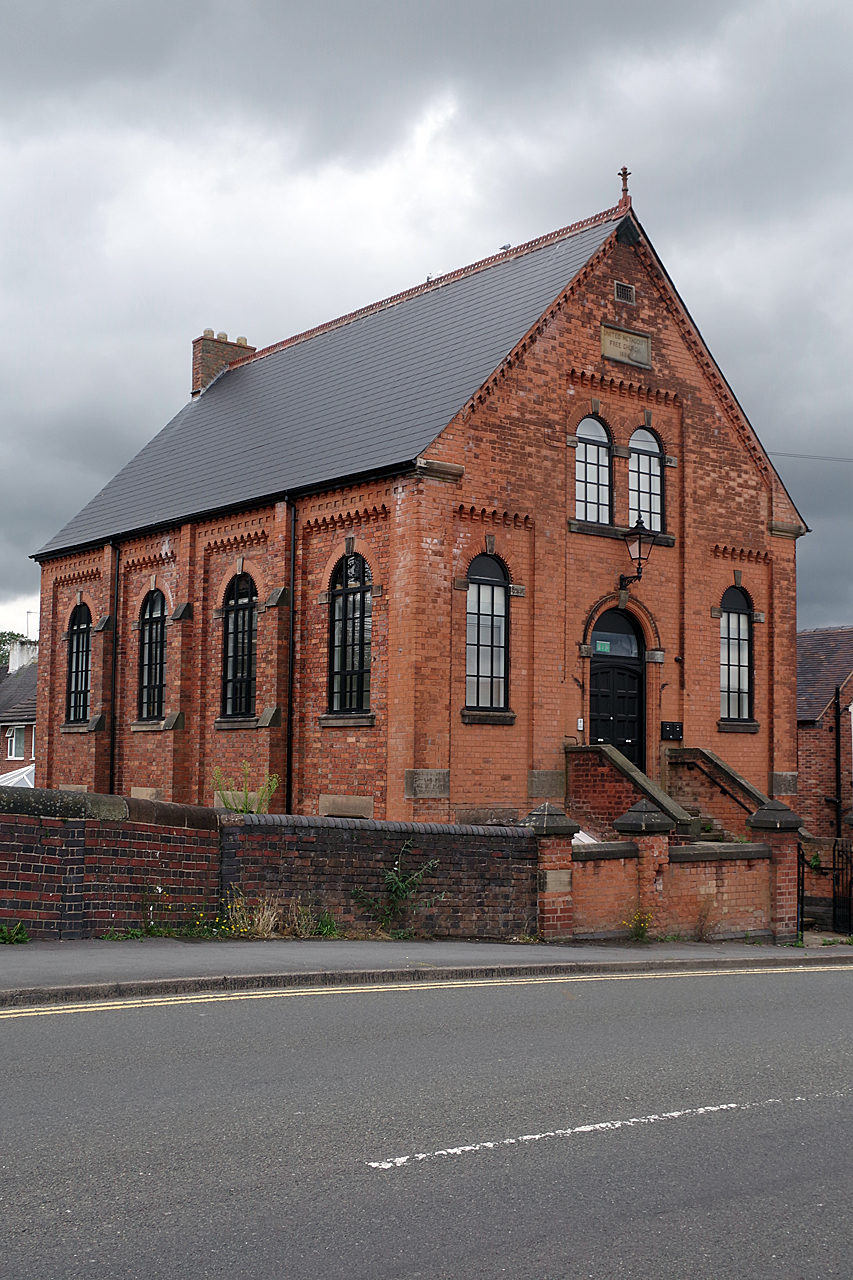
United Methodist Free Church, Fazeley

Replacing a previous building in Mile Lane which had become dilapidated, the United Methodist Free Church opened on 9 April 1884. The building occupies a pre-eminent site on Watling Street adjacent to the canal and was built for the sum of £1,200 (equivalent to £128,925 in 2025) by the Tamworth firm of Watton and Sons.

A new pipe organ was installed in 1909 at a cost of £100 (equivalent to £10,291 in 2025), obtained second-hand from St John’s Church, West Bromwich.

The church closed in 1991 when the congregation couldn't afford the repairs and maintenance necessary for the building.

=== Congregational ===
Fazeley Congregational Church was built by Joseph Wood on Atherstone Street in the Early English style and opened on 11 December 1856. For many years it was known as “Wood’s Chapel”.

It closed in 1932 owing to its insanitary and dilapidated condition, the members unable to find the resources to have a new building.

== Transport ==
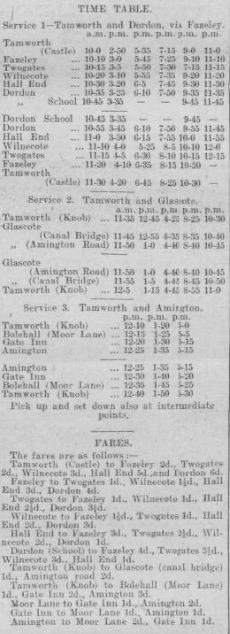
The initial bus service timetable and fares from the Tamworth Herald 5 July 1913

=== Canal ===
Fazeley became the junction of the Birmingham and Fazeley Canal and the Coventry Canal in 1789.

=== Road ===
Fazeley sits astride the old Roman road of Watling Street which was until 1882 a turnpike road.

The road is now much quieter following the rerouting of the A5 road to a new course between Fazeley and Tamworth. The road is now designated the B5404.

Fazeley Bridge crosses the River Tame and separates Two Gates from Fazeley. The Tame at this point is the boundary between the districts of Lichfield and Tamworth and was formerly the boundary between Staffordshire and Warwickshire. The bridge was built in 1796 to replace an earlier one destroyed by flooding. It is Grade II listed and has three segmental arches constructed of ashlar. The bridge was rebuilt in 1829-30.

The bridge was damaged in 1840 by someone pushing the capstones off. In 1843 it was reported that the flagged causeways on the bridge are so much worn that one side requires new flagging, and the other side repairing with the best of the old flags. The expense of the whole was estimated at £23 (equivalent to £2,527 in 2025). This work was completed by 1844.

=== Bus ===
The first bus service in Fazeley was introduced in July 1913 by John Thornburn of Tamworth who obtained a Daimler double-deck motor bus capable of carrying 34 passengers. His mill at Twogates was converted into a garage for storing and repairing the buses. He charged 2d (equivalent to £0.83 in 2025) for a trip from Tamworth Castle to Fazeley.

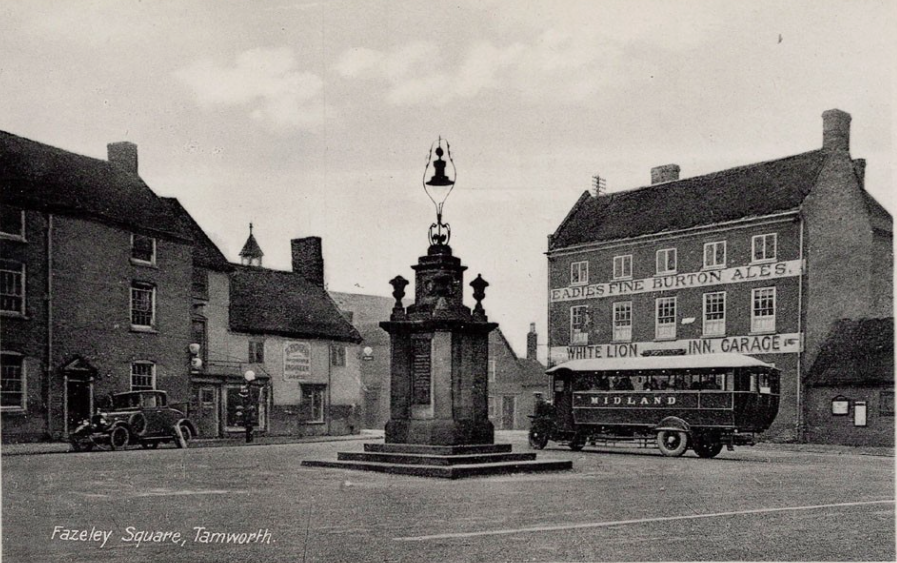
Fazeley Square

The North Warwickshire Motor Omnibus and Traction Company Limited was formed with a capital of £10,000 in 1913 to take over the public bus service business of John Thornburn at Tamworth and Nuneaton and to provide services in North Warwickshire, Staffordshire and Leicestershire, which included Fazeley. By December of that year a daily service of nine or ten buses ran between Tamworth and Dordon, Via Fazeley and Wilnecote.

The North Warwickshire Motor Omnibus was taken over in February 1918 by the Birmingham and Midland Motor Omnibus Company Limited which provided services until 1981. Midland Red North was created in 1981 and sold in 1988 to the Drawlane Transport Group. Later sold to British Bus, it became part of the Cowie Group. Today, it is part of Arriva Midlands.

Fazeley is served by regular Arriva bus service 110 from Tamworth to Birmingham.

=== Rail ===
From 1842 to 1904 Wilnecote Station in nearby Two Gates was known as Wilnecote and Fazeley.

== Governance ==
=== Fazeley Town Council ===
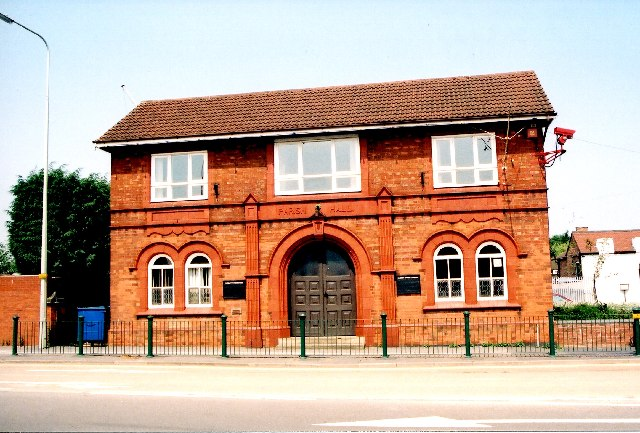
Fazeley Town Hall

Fazeley Town Council consists of eleven elected councillors. Of the eleven councillors, eight are from the Conservative Party and three from the Labour Party. In May 2012, at 21 years of age, Councillor Rebecca James became the youngest person ever to hold the post of The Worshipful The mayor of Fazeley and was Fazeley Town Council's youngest councillor at 18 years of age when she was elected in January 2009.

The current mayor of Fazeley is Cllr John Hill.

Fazeley Town Hall is used for both public and private events including, bingo, dancing, parties and carpet sales and Fazeley Town Council holds its meetings in the building.

=== Local authority ===
Despite bordering Tamworth, Fazeley is part of Lichfield District. Fazeley is also covered by Staffordshire County Council.

== Education ==
Fazeley has two primary schools, Millfield County Primary School and Longwood Primary School, in Mile Oak. Millfield was built in Victorian times and part of the original building remains.

== Sport ==
Fazeley is the home of Coton Green Football Club, who are located on New Mill Lane on the border of the Drayton Bassett parish. The club plays in the 10th tier of English Football, at Step 5 of the Non-League Pyramid.

== See also ==
- Listed buildings in Tamworth, Staffordshire
- Fazeley Mill
