= Catford Stadium =

Former greyhound racing venue in London

Coordinates: 51°26′56″N 0°1′28″W

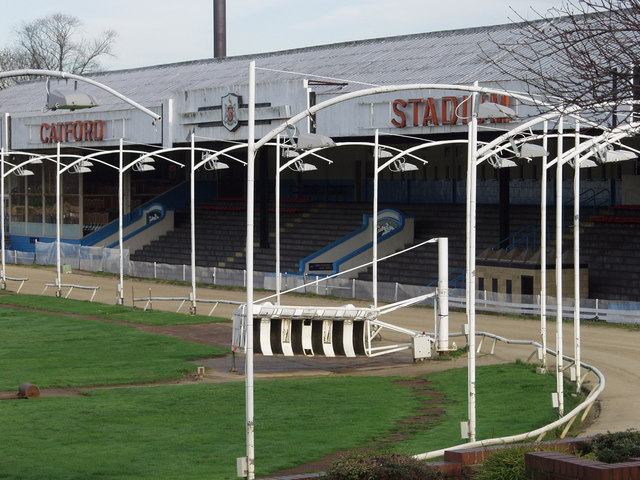
- Catford Stadium in 2003
- Interactive map of Catford Stadium
- Location: Catford, London

Construction
- Opened: 1932
- Closed: 2003

Catford Stadium was a historic greyhound racing stadium in Catford, a suburb of London.

== Origins ==
Charles Benstead and Frank Sutton founded the stadium on Southern Railway land between two commuter lines in 1932. The entrance was in Adenmore Road, west of Doggett Road.

== Greyhound racing ==
=== Opening ===
The inaugural meeting was held on Saturday 30 July 1932 and consisted of a seven race card; each event had four or five runners. Mick the Miller was paraded around the track before the fourth race. The first racing manager was Lt. Col. A J Vernon and there were no fewer than eighty bookmakers. A kennel complex was constructed at Layham's Farm, Keston, near Biggin Hill and six trainers were appointed.

The track was described as a tight 369 yard circumference circuit and the hare was an 'Outside Breco Silent' before being switched to a more conventional 'Outside McKee'. Buses originally dropped patrons off just outside the main gates and by the entrance gates were tote facilities and the South bank enclosure. The West forecourt had a covered grandstand with tote facilities, with the judges' box directly opposite the winning line. Behind this were the race day kennels. The East forecourt had a larger covered grandstand on the back straight. The track could also be accessed from behind this grandstand, as there were two bridges across the Southern Railway line. To use the bridges to the track an entrance fee was paid at the turnstiles on the other side of the railway line from the stadium itself; thus the bridges were actually part of the stadium complex. Finally opposite the main entrance on bends 3 and 4 was the famous tote board nestled between the uncovered north bank enclosure.

=== Pre War history ===
Early trainers at the track were Jock Hutchinson, H Hammond, Claude Champion, Albert Bedford, Harry Woolner, Dal Hawkesley and Ernie Pratt and a major event 'The Gold Collar' was introduced in 1933 which would gain classic status. Two other events called the Catford British Breeders Produce Stakes and Cobb Marathon Bowl were introduced; the former became very popular with the event being run twice during many years and the latter was sponsored by brewer Rupert Cobb and became a significant test for the leading staying stars, this race would continue until 1975.

=== Post War history ===
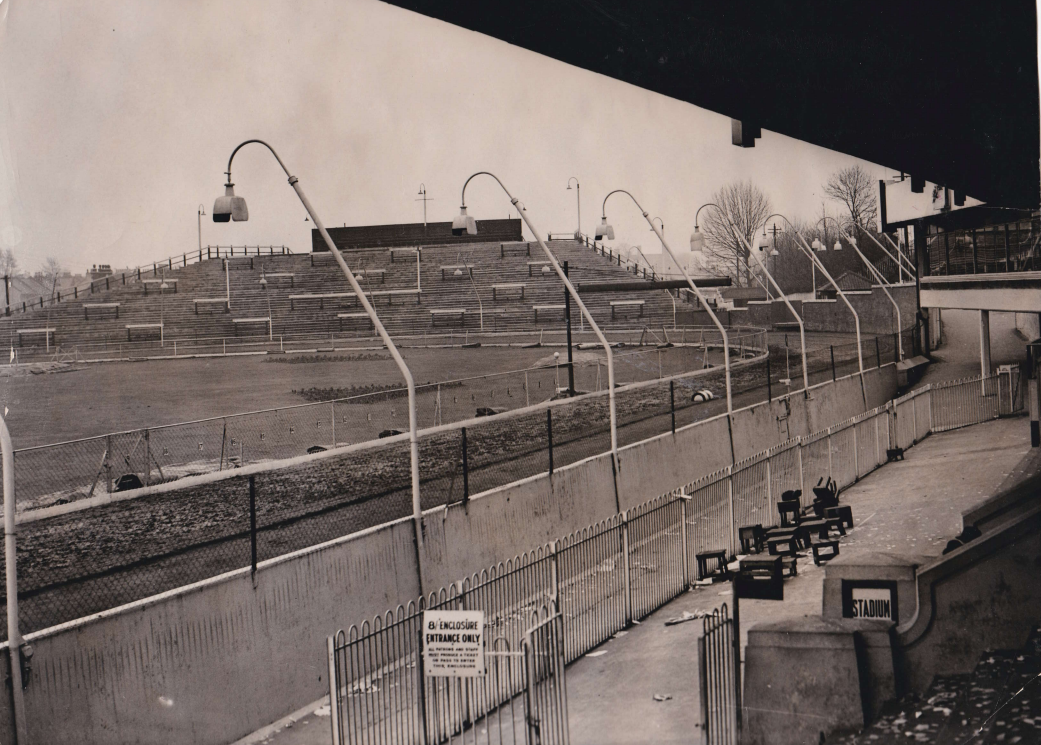
Catford Greyhound Stadium c.1950

Tote turnover after the war was extremely healthy and the seventh best in London and Great Britain just ahead of West Ham Stadium. On 20 September 1946 an express train from Victoria to Ramsgate derailed and five of the ten coaches fell down the 20 foot embankment landing in the stadium car park. The stadium employees were first on to the scene and remarkably only one person died as a result of the crash.

In 1952 the Managing Director Frank Sutton died; Sutton had introduced the British Breeders Produce Stakes. His son John would eventually take over from his father and take over the family business and introduced the very first jackpot pool in 1961, later to be copied by horse racing. In 1954 the Dave Barker trainer Ardskeagh Ville was the first and only hound from Catford to make the English Greyhound Derby final. Charles Benstead sold his share in the company in 1959 to Harold Clifton.

By 1963 the Greyhound Racing Association purchased the track and John Sutton eventually become their Managing Director. The GRA introduced under track heating system at Catford with electric cables sewn into the track eight inches under the turf. Sister track Charlton Stadium finished racing during 1971 resulting in the Greenwich Cup and Ben Truman Stakes finding a new home at Catford. One year later the track was the first London stadium to start eight dog racing and the circuit was substantially altered with steep banking on the bends.

During the 1970s trainers at the track would include Mike Smith, John Horsfall and Paddy Milligan. The legendary Scurlogue Champ set three track records over marathon distances of 718 and 888 metres from 1984-1986 and in 1987 the Scurry Gold Cup became another major event to be held at the track, the classic race arrived from Harringay Stadium after its closure.

The Cesarewitch was switched to from Belle Vue Stadium to Catford in 1995 before switching to Oxford Stadium later.

=== Controversy ===
During 2001–2002, a trainer Lennie Knell was caught on camera admitting overfeeding dogs to slow them down, and a greyhound died of heat exhaustion. Subsequently, the Greyhound Board of Great Britain brought in stringent rules that required every stadium and greyhound transporter to have cool air management systems and any trainer found deliberately overfeeding dogs would lose their licence. Knell was disqualified from all licensed greyhound tracks in May 2002 after an inquiry by the governing body.

=== Closure ===
On 6 November 2003, following years of rumours, the track closed overnight without warning, when it was announced the previous day's race meeting had been the last.

Trainers John Simpson, Tony Taylor, Maxine Locke and John Walsh moved to Wimbledon, Keston based Steve Gammon left for Crayford, Sonja Spiers and Kevin Connor went to Sittingbourne and Mark Lavender switched to Portsmouth. Racing Manager Derek Hope was able to take up the same position at Wimbledon soon after because Simon Harris had left for Coventry Stadium bookmaker John Humphreys who had stood in the main ring since 1966 and sponsored the Gold Collar for 18 years, retired.

== Speedway ==
In 1934 several speedway meetings were held on a track constructed inside the dog track. In 1949 permission was sought to operate speedway from the stadium again but permission was refused. Not to be confused with The Mount stadium, another stadium in Catford.

== Redevelopment ==
The local amateur football side, Catford Wanderers, were mooted to move into the stadium, though this dream was never realised. The stadium has since caught on fire and was subsequently demolished, along with the iconic tote board. The site has been redeveloped for housing by Barratt Homes as "Catford Green".

== Competitions ==
=== Gold Collar ===
(an original classic competition)

=== Scurry Gold Cup ===
(an original classic competition)

=== Cesarewitch ===
(an original classic competition)

== Track records ==
Pre-metric distances
Distance (yards)	Greyhound	Time	Date	Notes/refs
420	Cheathas Artist	23.88	25 September 1971	
440	South Tipperary	27.92	30 July 1932	
440	Jazz First	26.18	5 August 1932	
440	Wild Woolley	25.95	6 May 1933	Gold Collar heats
440	Jack's Joke	25.95	14 June 1935	
440	Fine Jubilee	25.82	26 May 1936	Gold Collar heats
440	Fine Jubilee	25.42	25 May 1937	
440	Monday's News	25.41	31 May 1947	Gold Collar semi-finals
440	Hectic Birthday	=25.41	31 May 1952	Gold Collar final
440	Polonius	25.40	16 March 1953	
440	Rusty Chain	25.26	19 May 1956	
440	Dangerous Customer	=25.26	5 July 1958	
440	Shanes Rocket	=25.26	1970	
570	I'm Dogmatic	32.99	15 April 1963	
600	Congleton Lord		17 April 1938	
600	Shadowlands Delight	35.20	1950	
610	The Phoenix	35.08	6 January 1972	
620	Music Guest	35.98	4 July 1964	
620	Discretions	35.83	1970	
700	May Hasty	40.03	1950	
745	Gorey Hill	44.97	3 July 1965	
745	Suir Peggy	44.43	1970	
790	Breachs Buzzard	45.91	18 December 1971	
810	Ilene Darling	53.70	31 January 1933	
810	Drintyre	51.46	7 March 1933	
810	Extra Smart	51.27	17 June 1933	
810	Master Ralph	50.90	7 August 1933	
810	Dapifir	50.35	29 March 1934	
810	Real Busy	50.04	12 July 1934	
810	English Warrior	49.10	16 August 1934	
810	Alvaston Lulu Belle	48.58	21 July 1945	
810	Tia Tina	48.48	27 September 1958	
810	Rapid Prospect	48.44	4 July 1959	
810	I'm Dogmatic	48.40	16 May 1964	
940	Chi Chi	58.10	10 March 1962	
970	Budget Surplus	58.87	1963	
978	Real Darkie	58.87	11 December 1971	
1156	Spots of Luck	70.94	25 September 1971	
1180	Trev's Carriers	79.80	23 January 1945	
1180	Western Dasher	74.42	1950	
1180	Lankey Lena	72.70	4 July 1959	
1180	Farma Zora	72.31	1969	
420 H	Sherrys Prince	24.39	2 November 1971	
440 H	Bright Board	26.19	1950	
440 H	Maggie From Cork	25.83	7 July 1962	
600 H	Derryboy Jubilee	36.31	1950	
610 H	Sherrys Prince	35.75	5 February 1972	
620 H	Knockshe Prince	37.93	13 February 1965	

Metric distances
Distance (metres)	Greyhound	Time	Date	Notes
222	Blinding Service	13.73	1988	
222	Kiltown Prior	13.68	1989	
222	I'm From Tallow	13.56	1990	
385	Tipper Tar	23.63	March 1973	Greenwich Cup
385	One To Note	23.54	11 May 1985	
385	I'm Gone	23.54	18 July 1987	
385	Farncombe Black	23.42	1988	
385	Bolt Home	23.35	1989	
385	Union Decree	23.20	4 July 1998	Scurry Gold Cup semi-final
517	Hello Blackie	32.03	1989	
555	Westmead Champ	34.65	1976	
555	Track Man	34.47	22 September 1984	
555	Rio Shadow	34.41	9 May 1998	Greenwich Cup semi-final
718	Scurlogue Champ	45.58	20 October 1984	
850	Proud To Run	55.25	1989	
888	Pitmans Brief	58.47	1976	
888	Scurlogue Champ	58.00	5 June 1985	
888	Scurlogue Champ	57.60	19 June 1986	
1050	Cregagh Prince	69.93	25 April 1987	
385 H	Ballaugh Echo	24.17	19 June 1986	
385 H	Parktown Ranger	24.03	1988	
385 H	Pantile	23.85	1989	
385 H	Kildare Slippy	23.73	18 May 1991	
517 H	Breeks Rocket	33.23	1990	
555 H	Autumn River	35.72	1977	
555 H	Off You Sail	35.35	18 July 1987	
555 H	Freewheel Kylo	35.34	1994	
555 H	El Tenor	35.15	27 May 1999	
718 H	Kanturk Cannon	48.43	2 May 2002	

- H = Hurdles
