= Rosedale East Side =

Civil parish in North Yorkshire, England

- Civil parish
- Calcining Kilns, East Rosedale Mine
- Interactive map of Rosedale East Side
- Coordinates: parish 54.377°N 0.900°W
- Country: England
- County: North Yorkshire

Area
  - Total: 3,221 ha (7,960 acres)

Population (2011)
  - Total: 318
  - Density: 9.87/km^{2} (25.6/sq mi)
- Time zone: UTC00:00
- Post Code: YO18
- ONS parish code: E04007620

Rosedale East Side is a civil parish in North Yorkshire, England. The parish is divided from Rosedale West Side civil parish by the River Seven, which meanders between the two parishes. The village of Rosedale Abbey is within the parish.

== History ==
Rosedale East Side was created as a civil parish in 1866, from the ancient parish of Middleton, which was in the wapentake of Pickering Lythe. Previous to this, both this parish and the civil parish of Rosedale West Side, were townships, with the River Seven dividing the two. In 1974, the parish was transferred from the old county of North Riding of Yorkshire, into North Yorkshire. The parish ONS code is E04007620, and the postcode is YO18, under the post town of Pickering. Besides bordering Rosedale West Side, the parish also shares a border with the civil parishes of Danby, Glaisdale, Hartoft, and Westerdale. Historically, the area was known for its alum, jet and most importantly, iron ore resources, which were important for the developing steel industry on Teesside. The settlement of Rosedale Abbey (a village), lies within the parish.

=== Population ===
Population of Rosedale East Side 1801–2015
Year	1801	1811	1821	1831	1841	1851	1861	1871	1881	1891	1901	1911	1921	1931	1951	1961	1971	2001	2011	2015
Population	287	308	339	376	387	373	446	2,041	393	815	882	774	677	426	297	203	173	292	318	210 (Note: Estimated)

The surge in population numbers between 1861 and 1871 is directly attributed to the iron ore mining ventures attracting miners into the parish.

== See also ==
- Listed buildings in Rosedale East Side
