= Rosedale, North Yorkshire =

Valley in North Yorkshire, England

Coordinates: 54.351°N 0.894°W

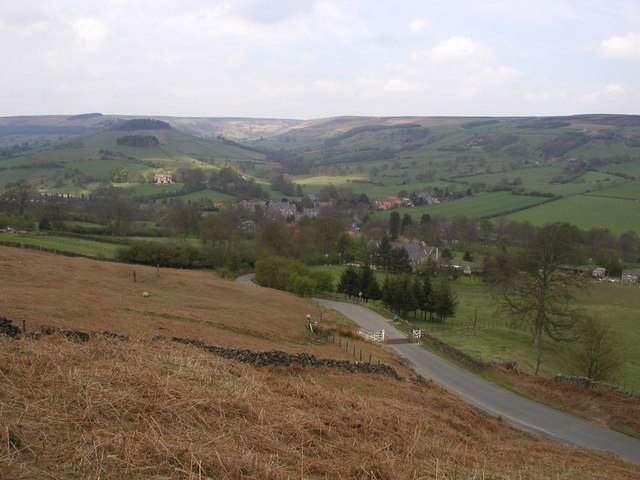
View towards Rosedale Abbey

Rosedale is a valley located almost in the centre of the North York Moors national park in North Yorkshire, England. The nearest town is Kirkbymoorside, 7 miles (11 km) to the south. Rosedale is surrounded by moorland. To the north-west sits Blakey Ridge at over 1,300 feet (400 m) above sea level. At Dale Head is the source of the River Seven, which flows down the valley to join the River Rye at Little Habton near Malton. At its southern end Rosedale is squeezed between Spaunton Moor and Hartoft Rigg, where the river flows out through Forestry Commission woodland before passing the village of Cropton to reach the plains of the Vale of Pickering.

The modern village of Rosedale Abbey, built around the site of a former Cistercian Priory is the main settlement in the valley. There is also a small hamlet at Thorgill.

Few inhabitants of Rosedale work in farming. The majority of houses are bought as second homes and as such the permanent local population has been significantly reduced.

In mid-August, Rosedale Show is held at Rosedale Abbey and attracts some 5,000 people from all parts of Britain. The show dates back to 1871 and is one of the oldest in North Yorkshire.

The Frank Elgee memorial was erected in 1953 at Blakey Ridge on The North York Moors, overlooking Loose Howe at Rosedale Head.

== Name ==
There was no mention of Rosedale in the Domesday Book of 1086 AD (Note: Parishes: Middleton (William Page ). . .No mention of ROSEDALE. . .is found in the Domesday Book. It must, however, have been in the king's hands together with Middleton and Cropton, for these places afterwards formed part of the honour of Rosedale. The first lord of this fee was Turgis Brundos, lord of Liddell, who is styled Turgis de Rosedale in a charter of about 1125. He died before 1130–1 and was succeeded by William his son, founder of Rosedale Priory for nuns of the Cistercian order. . .) However the name Rozebi (Note: The name element '-by' ("village") suggests Old Norse influence. (Note: Chapter Seven THE SCANDINAVIAN ELEMENT (P H Reaney) < -by > . . .The element '-by' is extremely common wherever the Scandinavian's settled in England, particularly in: Lincolnshire; Leicestershire; North Riding of Yorkshire. . .In England the usual meaning is " village " (Note: Note the different meanings: " homestead " from Norway (Old West Norse); " village " from Denmark (Old East Norse); " boundary "))) (Note: Note the spelling with a 'Z', suggesting a Cornish or Brittonic influence. (Note: See Roose , Cumbria > . . .Roose was pronounced with a hard S, as in goose; now it is locally pronounced 'Rooze', due to the Cornish accent.)) is shown in the paragraph for Pickering. (Note: Historically Rosedale was in the parish of Middleton and the wapentake of Pickering – Lythe. (Note: See Rosedale > History > Governance (19th century) > . . .Pickering – Lythe) The place name Rozebi is shown on line 10 of paragraph 4 on Page 3 Yorkshire in the Domesday Book. Middleton is shown on line 12 of the same paragraph.) The survey of English Place-Names records "Russedal(e)" in 1130, "Rossedal(e)" in 1186, "Rossdale" in 1328 and "Rosedale" and "Rosedall" in 1376.

The toponym might be "Russi's valley" or "Valley beside high but relatively level moorland promontory". (Note: Brittonic Language (Alan James) < rōs >. .Proto-Semitic root *ra'š: " headland, promontory ". . .Watson, CPNS p.116: " something forth-standing ". . .Sanskrit prastha: " something spread out "; " something that can be proceeded across ". . . so a broader sense: " high but relatively level ground "; " upland pasture, moorland ". . .)

The name element dale is from Old Norse dalr or Middle English dale. The name element rose is from Brittonic rōs and might be a reference to Blakey Ridge that defines the west side of the dale.

== Rosedale Head ==
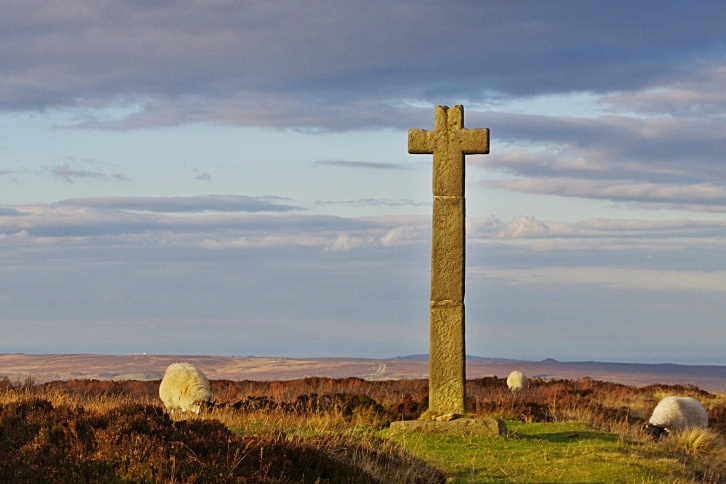
Young Ralph Cross – Emblem of North York Moors National Park.

Rosedale Head is at the top of the dale at the point where the River Seven rises from the ground. The surrounding moorland is typical of the heather moorland of the North York Moors National Park. In the 18th century the moorland belonged to the Helmsley Estate. (Note: The Megalithic Portal Old Ralphs Cross – Ancient Cross . . . " On the north face at the centre of the cross piece are the initials CD with the date 1708. This stands for Charles Duncombe owner of what was in 1708 the 40,000 acre Helmsley Estate on which Old Ralph stood. . .)

Rosedale Head separates Rosedale from its neighbouring dales to the north, Westerdale, Danby Dale and Great Fryup dale.

=== Old Ralph – Young Ralph ===
Old Ralph and Young Ralph are probably the best known of the many wayside crosses found in the North York Moors National Park. (Note: North York Moors National Park. . . " Young Ralph’s Cross, today the emblem of the National Park, can still be seen today located on the road between Castleton and The Lion Inn on Blakey Ridge. . .) The origin of the names Old Ralph and Young Ralph is not known, however the names might refer to members of the House of Neville: (Note: Rosedale priory closed in 1536, as a result of Henry VIII's dissolution of the monasteries. Following the closure the site was granted to Ralph Neville, 4th Earl of Westmorland. (Note: ROSEDALE, EAST-SIDE (Thomas Langdale). . .The site was granted. . .to Ralph Nevile, Earl of Westmorland. . .About the time of the dissolution. . .))

Old Ralph cross is a monolithic wayside cross of hard gritstone that stands about 6 feet tall, possibly 11th century. The cross is a Grade II* listed building. The cross is located on Ledging Hill the highest point on Blakey Ridge (OS ref: NZ 674 019). (Note: The Megalithic Portal Old Ralphs Cross – Ancient Cross. . . " It is located on Ledging Hill the highest point on Blakey Ridge. It originates from before 1200 and is probably 11th Century.. . .)

Young Ralph cross is a wayside cross of hard gritstone that stands about 10 feet (3.0 m) tall, possibly 11th century. The cross is located on Ledging Hill (OS ref: NZ 677 021). The distinctive profile of the cross is used as the emblem of the North York Moors National Park.

== History ==
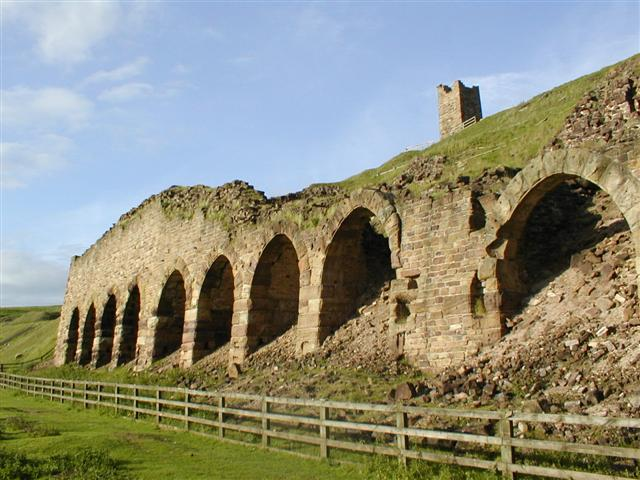
Ruins of calcining kilns near Rosedale East Ironstone Mine

=== Mining ===
The extraction of ironstone probably began during the Roman period. (Note: See Ironstone mining in Cleveland and North Yorkshire > History > References > . . .Wilson, P R (2016)) (Note: See also Mining in Roman Britain > Iron mining)

In the late 19th century the valley quickly became a major centre for iron-ore extraction. (Note: See Ironstone mining in Rosedale) (Note: Parishes: Middleton (William Page). . .there are ironstone mines on Rosedale Moor, a vein of great richness having been discovered some years ago, but being now nearly exhausted. Jet, alum shale, cement stones and excellent freestone are found in Rosedale, as well as coal, which, however, is no longer worked. . . .) Mining took place from 1857 to 1928. The ore was pre-processed by calcination, for which special kilns were built.

The mines were served by the freight-only Rosedale Branch railway line that ran round the head of the valley, serving mine workings on either side, and across the moors to reach what is now the Esk Valley Line at Battersby Junction. The railway line closed in 1929 after the last of the calcine dust extracted from the kiln waste had been sold.

Rosedale Chimney Bank, one of the steepest roads in the United Kingdom, provides a popular entrance point into the valley. A row of disused kilns and a former Royal Observer Corps Underground Monitoring Post are both situated yards from its summit. In the adjacent Farndale Valley wild daffodils bloom around Easter time.

== Governance ==
Historically the governance of Rosedale was split east–west by the River Seven. In the 19th century Rosedale East Side was in the parish of Middleton and the wapentake of Pickering – Lythe, (Note: ROSEDALE, EAST-SIDE (Thomas Langdale). . .in the parish of Middleton, wapentake of Pickering-Lytbe – Pop. 339. . . .) while Rosedale West Side was in the parish of Lastingham and the wapentake of Ryedale. (Note: ROSEDALE, WEST-SIDE (Thomas Langdale). . .in the parish of Lastingham, wapentake of Rydale – Pop. 179 . . .)

== See also ==
- Listed buildings in Rosedale East Side
- Listed buildings in Rosedale West Side
