= Rosedale West Side =

Civil parish in North Yorkshire, England

- Civil parish
- Cottages near to Rosedale Chimney
- Interactive map of Rosedale West Side
- Coordinates: parish 54.363°N 0.922°W
- Country: England
- County: North Yorkshire

Area
  - Total: 1,120 ha (2,800 acres)

Population (2001)
  - Total: 117
  - Density: 10.4/km^{2} (27.1/sq mi)
- Post Code: YO18; YO62
- ONS parish code: E04007621

Rosedale West Side (historically known as Rosedale Westside) is a civil parish in North Yorkshire, England. The parish is divided from Rosedale East Side civil parish by the River Seven, which meanders between the two parishes. The only settlement in the parish is the hamlet of Thorgill.

== History ==
Rosedale West Side, previously a township, was created as a civil parish in 1866, from the ancient parish of Lastingham, which was in the wapentake of Ryedale. The township was known as Rosedale Westside which was included in a grant of land of the Spaunton area, and the later parish included the undivided parts of Spaunton Moor until 1934. In 1974, the parish was transferred from the old county of the North Riding of Yorkshire, into North Yorkshire. The parish ONS code is E04007621, and the postcode is YO18, and YO62, under the post town of Pickering. The dividing line between the two parishes (Rosedale West Side and Rosedale East Side) is the River Seven.

Rosedale West Side contains the hamlet of Thorgill; the settlement had only a few houses until the ironstone mining boom, when more dwellings were built to cope with the influx of people. Thorgill lies on the western side of the parish and has a view across the valley towards the settlement of Rosedale Abbey itself. It is thought to be named after Thor, the god of thunder. Historically, the area was known for its alum, jet and most importantly, iron ore resources, which were important for the developing steel industry on Teesside.

=== Population ===
Population of Rosedale West Side 1801–2015
Year	1801	1811	1821	1831	1841	1851	1861	1871	1881	1891	1901	1911	1921	1931	1951	1961	1971	2001	2011	2015
Population	117	156	179	178	201	175	338	798	309	549	514	329	285	217	151	83	61	117	80 (Note: Estimated)	80 (Note: Estimated)

The surge in population numbers between 1851 and 1871 is directly attributed to the iron ore mining ventures attracting miners into the parish.

== See also ==
- Listed buildings in Rosedale West Side
