= Listed buildings in Rosedale East Side =

Rosedale East Side is a civil parish in the county of North Yorkshire, England. It contains 24 listed buildings that are recorded in the National Heritage List for England. All the listed buildings are designated at Grade II, the lowest of the three grades, which is applied to "buildings of national importance and special interest". Rosedale is a valley through which passes the River Seven, and this list contains the listed buildings in the valley to the east of the river. It includes the village of Rosedale Abbey, and the surrounding countryside and moorland. The listed buildings include houses, a church and items in the churchyard, the remains of a priory, a well, two bridges, a hotel, a mill and associated structures, a former smithy, a guidestone, and nine boundary stones.

== Buildings ==
Name and location	Photograph	Date	Notes
Priory remains 54.35373°N 0.88807°W		13th century	The remains of the priory are in sandstone, and consist of the angle of a wall with two buttresses, and a spiral staircase.
Waterhouse Well; 54.35511°N 0.89288°E	—	Medieval (probable)	The well, which was rebuilt in the 20th century, is in sandstone, and has a rectangular plan. Steps lead down to a doorway with a trapezoid lintel. Inside, there is a stone slab seat, a stone water channel and a drain hole.
Chest tomb 54.35392°N 0.88750°W	—	Early 18th century (probable)	The chest tomb is in the churchyard of St Mary and St Laurence's Church, to the northeast of the church. It consists of a plain chest constructed of single stone slabs, with a flat, overhanging cover. The chest is curved at one end, and has bevelled corners at the other end.
Guidestone; 54.39566°N 0.91978°W		Early 18th century	The guidestone by Knott Road is in sandstone and consists of a rectangular post about 1.3 metres (4 ft 3 in) in height. The west face is inscribed "ROSDALE", and the east face "WHITBY".
Watson chest tomb 54.35387°N 0.88757°W	—	c. 1740	The chest tomb is in the churchyard of St Mary and St Laurence's Church, to the northeast of the church, and commemorates members of the Watson family. It is in sandstone, and consists of a plain chest constructed of single stone slabs with a moulded cover. There are traces of lettering.
Page headstone 54.35411°N 0.88727°W	—	1773	The headstone is in the churchyard of St Mary and St Laurence's Church, to the northeast of the church. It commemorates John Page, and consists of a rectangular stone with a shaped head. On the east face are two putti holding an hourglass and blowing trumpets, on an inscribed panel with a moulded surround. The west face has a representation of a door of four raised and fielded panels.
Bow Bridge; 54.35230°N 0.88675°W		Late 18th century	The bridge carries Gill Lane over the River Seven. It is in sandstone and consists of a single segmental arch of voussoirs flanked by pilaster buttresses that rise into the parapet to form rectangular piers. The bridge has a continuous impost band under a plain parapet. The end piers have a square section, cambered coping and low pyramidal caps.
Larch Tree Cottage; 54.35392°N 0.88881°W	—	Late 18th century	The house, at one time a police house, has been altered and extended. It is in sandstone, and has a pantile roof with coped gables. There are two storeys, two bays, and a three-bay cell block extension to the left. The doorway has a chamfered surround, to its right is an initialled datestone, and the windows have top-opening lights. The cell block contains casement windows.
The Milburn Arms; 54.35422°N 0.88579°W		1776	The hotel, which has been extended, is in sandstone and has a pantile roof with coped gables and shaped kneelers. The original block has three storeys and four bays, an extension at right angles on the left has two storeys and three bays, and a later cross-wing has two storeys and an attic and three bays. The windows are a mix of sashes, some horizontally sliding, and casements, and one doorway has an inscribed and dated lintel.
Abbey Mill stable buildings 54.35275°N 0.88764°W	—	Early 19th century	The stable buildings, later used for other purposes, are in sandstone and have pantile roofs with coped gables, and a single storey. The front range has a central gabled bay, with three bays to the left, two to the right, and at the end a gabled cross-wing. The central bay has a round arch containing a doorway, above which is a clock face. In the cross-wing are two segmental coach arches, and a lifting door above with a fanlight in a round arch. The other bays contain horizontally sliding sash windows.
Blacksmith's Shop; 54.35421°N 0.88834°W	—	Early 19th century	The smithy is in sandstone, with eaves guttering on wrought iron brackets, and a pantile roof. There is one storey and eight bays. The original cart arches are blocked by a doorway and a window. The other openings are a doorway, horizontally sliding sash windows and fixed windows. By the doorway is a mounting block.
Boundary stone at NZ 69032 01525; 54.40450°N 0.93807°W		Early 19th century	The boundary stone is in sandstone, and consists of a rectangular stone post with a whitewashed top about 1.1 metres (3 ft 7 in) in height. Inscribed on the northeast face is "D", and on the southwest face "R".
Boundary stone at NZ 69766 01100; 54.40064°N 0.92687°W	—	Early 19th century	The boundary stone by Knott Road is in sandstone, and consists of a rectangular stone post with a whitewashed top about 1.1 metres (3 ft 7 in) in height. Inscribed on the northeast face is "D", and on the southwest face "R".
Boundary stone at NZ 68905 01596; 54.40521°N 0.94000°W		Early 19th century	The boundary stone is in sandstone, and consists of a roughly shaped stone post with a whitewashed top about 0.55 metres (1 ft 10 in) in height.Inscribed on the northeast face is "D", and on the southwest face "R".
Boundary stone at NZ 69131 01466; 54.40397°N 0.93655°W		Early 19th century	The boundary stone is in sandstone, and consisted of a rectangular post with a whitewashed top about 1.1 metres (3 ft 7 in) in height. Inscribed on the northeast face is "D".
Boundary stone at NZ 68786 01665; 54.40581°N 0.94183°W		Early 19th century	The boundary stone is in sandstone, and consists of a rectangular post with a whitewashed top about 1 metre (3 ft 3 in) in height. Inscribed on the northeast face is "D".
Boundary stone at NZ 69208 01665; 54.40354°N 0.93535°W	—	Early 19th century	The boundary stone by Knott Road is in sandstone, and consists of a rectangular post with a whitewashed top about 1.1 metres (3 ft 7 in) in height. Inscribed on the northeast face is "D", and on the southwest face "R".
Boundary stone at NZ 69450 01283; 54.40229°N 0.93167°W		Early 19th century	The boundary stone is in sandstone, and consists of a rectangular post with a whitewashed top about 1.3 metres (4 ft 3 in) in height. Inscribed on the northeast face is "D", and on the southwest face "R".
Boundary stone at NZ 68300 01948; 54.40841°N 0.94926°W	—	Early 19th century	The boundary stone by Knott Road is in sandstone, and consists of a rectangular post with a whitewashed top about 1.1 metres (3 ft 7 in) in height.
Boundary stone at NZ 68602 01774; 54.40679°N 0.94464°W		Early 19th century	The boundary stone is in sandstone, and consists of a roughly shaped stone with a whitewashed top about 0.85 metres (2 ft 9 in) in height. Inscribed on the southwest face is "R".
St Mary and St Laurence's Church; 54.35378°N 0.88776°W		1839–40	The church, designed by Lewis Vulliamy, is in sandstone with a slate roof, and incorporates a 14th-century window. It consists of a nave and a chancel in a single unit, and a south vestry. On the west gable is a gabled bellcote with a pointed bell opening. The windows are tall lancets.
20–22 Rosedale Abbey; 54.35398°N 0.88831°W		Mid-19th century	A terrace of three houses in sandstone with a slate roof and coped gables. There are two storeys and ten bays, including two two-bay gables flanking the centre containing blind cruciform slits, and smaller gables over the outer bays. The doorways have pointed heads, and the windows are sashes. All the openings have hood moulds.
Bridge over Northdale Beck; 54.35445°N 0.88699°W		1851	The bridge, which carries a road over a stream, is in rusticated stone, and consists of a single semicircular arch of voussoirs under a raised band. There is a raked-up parapet with cambered coping ending in rectangular piers. Over the centre of the arch is a datestone.
Abbey Mill and cottage 54.35294°N 0.88741°W	—	1853	The mill and adjacent cottage are in sandstone with pantile roofs and coped gables. The mill has two storeys and an attic, and two bays. There is a variety of openings including doorways, windows, an inspection hole, and at the rear is a blocked wheelchamber opening and a lifting door. Above the lintel of the main doorway is an inscribed and dated shaped panel, and above is a re-set datestone. The cottage has a single storey and four bays, and contains a doorway and horizontally sliding sash windows.
