= St Mary and St Laurence's Church =

St Mary and St Laurence's Church is the name of:

- St Mary and St Laurence's Church, Bolsover, Derbyshire, in England
- St Mary and St Laurence's Church, Rosedale Abbey, North Yorkshire, in England
