= The Milburn Arms =

Pub in Rosedale Abbey, Yorkshire, England

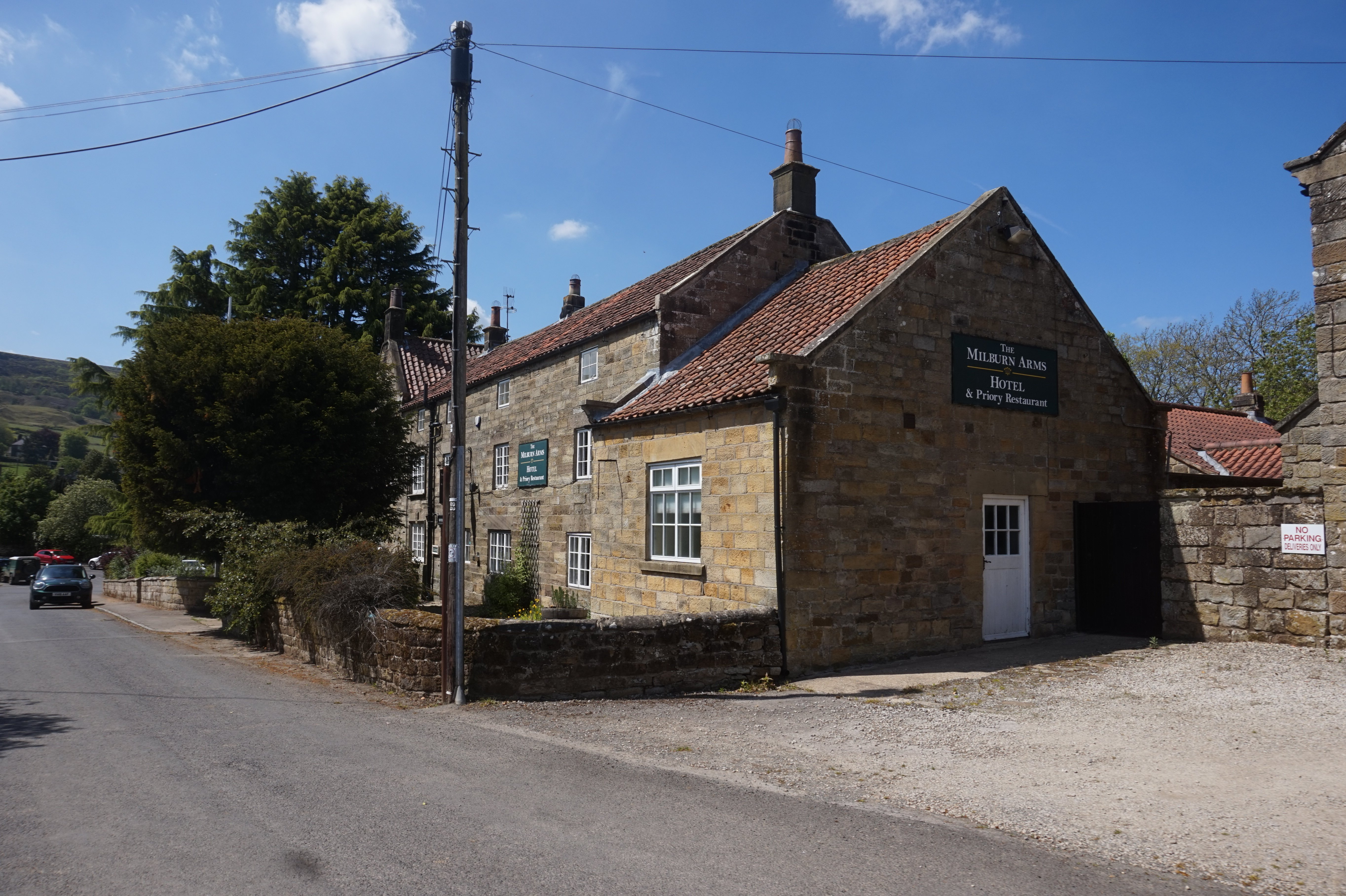
The hotel, in 2020

The Milburn Arms is a historic hotel in Rosedale Abbey, a village in North Yorkshire, in England.

The building was constructed in 1776, as the house of John Page, the bailiff of the manor. It was converted into a pub by the end of the century, initially named the "Crown Inn". An extension was added behind the left end in the early 19th century, and a further extension was added to it later in the century. By the 21st century, it was operating as a hotel, with 12 bedrooms, a restaurant and a bar. The hotel closed in 2008, and in 2010 there were plans to convert it into an outdoor activity centre for the Havelock Academy. In 2014, it was instead purchased by Danby Castle and reopened as a hotel, but it closed again in 2018 and was marketed for sale for £595,000 in 2022. The building has been grade II listed since 1987.

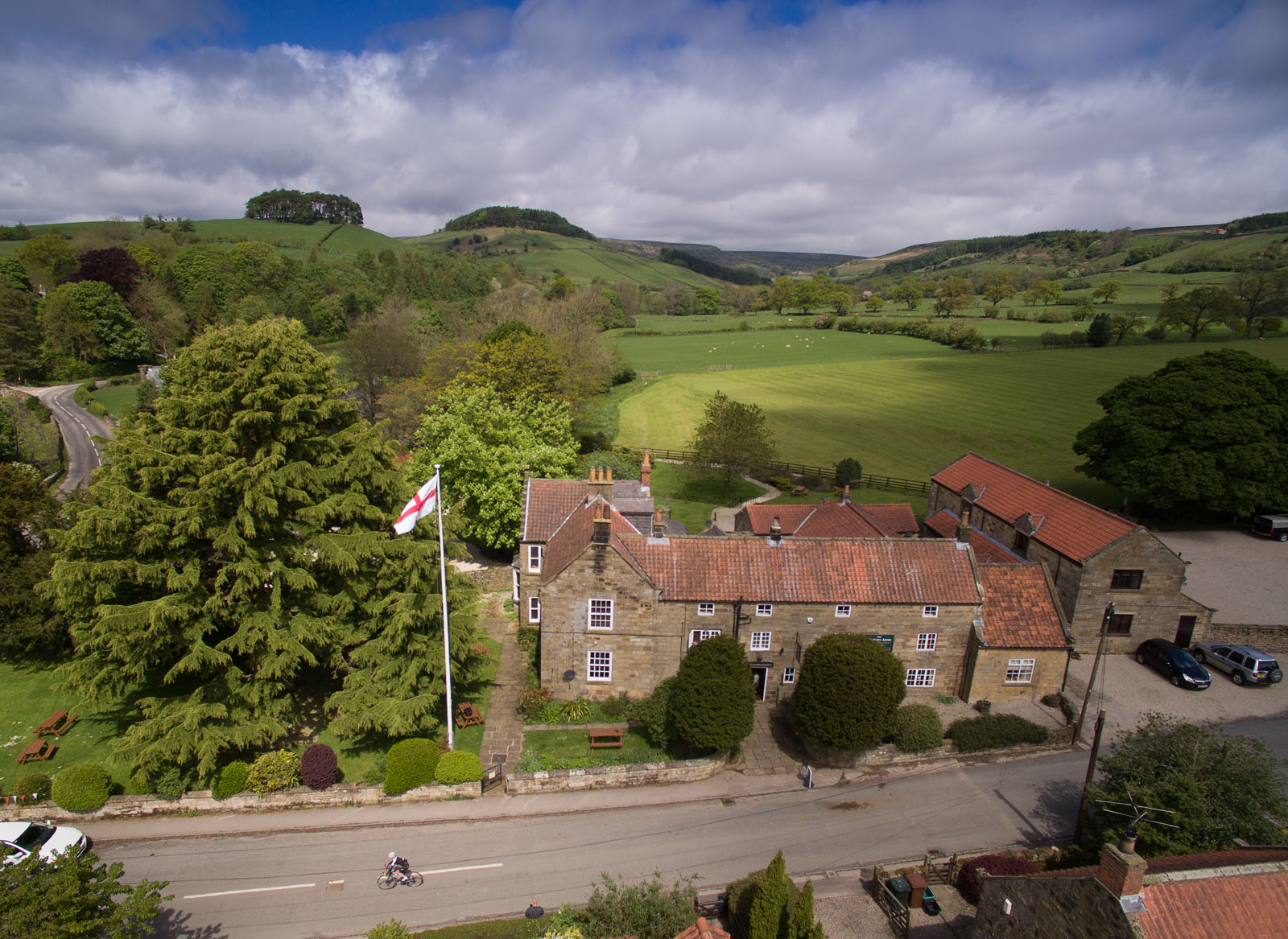
Aerial view of the hotel

The hotel is built of sandstone and has a pantile roof with coped gables and shaped kneelers. The original block has three storeys and four bays, an extension at right angles on the left has two storeys and three bays, and a later cross-wing has two storeys and an attic and three bays. The windows are a mix of sashes, some horizontally sliding, and casements, and one doorway has an inscribed and dated lintel.

== See also ==
- Listed buildings in Rosedale East Side
