= Listed buildings in Appleton-le-Moors =

Appleton-le-Moors is a civil parish in the county of North Yorkshire, England. It contains 24 listed buildings that are recorded in the National Heritage List for England. Of these, one is listed at Grade I, the highest of the three grades, and the others are at Grade II, the lowest grade. The parish contains the village of Appleton-le-Moors and the surrounding area. Most of the listed buildings are houses and cottages in the village, and the others include a church, its former parsonage, two wayside crosses, public houses, a farmhouse, a former mill and mill house, a former school and schoolmaster's house, a war memorial and a telephone kiosk.

== Key ==
Grade	Criteria
I	Buildings of exceptional interest, sometimes considered to be internationally important
II	Buildings of national importance and special interest

== Buildings ==
Name and location	Photograph	Date	Notes	Grade
High Cross; 54.28741°N 0.87451°W		Medieval	The wayside cross is in sandstone. It consists of a portion of a shaft about 0.75 metres (2 ft 6 in) high, on a base, on an octagonal cobbled pavement.	II
Low Cross; 54.28417°N 0.87377°W		Medieval	The wayside cross is in sandstone and is about 1.25 metres (4 ft 1 in) high. It consists of a roughly shaped monolith with a circular hole drilled through it, standing on a cobbled octagonal pavement.	II
Pear Tree Cottage; 54.28117°N 0.87249°W	—	Early 18th century	A house with an outbuilding incorporated, it is in limestone with sandstone dressings, quoins and a pantile roof. There is a single storey and attics, and three bays. In the centre are double doors, most of the windows are horizontally-sliding sashes, and all the openings have lintels with keystones.	II
Woodlands; 54.28079°N 0.87162°W	—	Early 18th century	The house, which has earlier origins, is in limestone with a pantile roof. There are two storeys and three bays. On the front is a timber gabled porch, there is one casement window, and the other windows are horizontally-sliding sashes.	II
New Inn House; 54.28160°N 0.87272°W		1733	A public house later divided into two private houses, it is in limestone, with quoins, a coved eaves course, and a pantile roof with coped gables and kneelers. There are two storeys and four bays. The two doorways and the windows, which are sashes, have lintels with keystones, the keystone above the left door inscribed with initials and the date.	II
Hazelwood; 54.27967°N 0.87074°W	—	c. 1750	The house is in limestone, with sandstone dressings, and a slate roof with coped gables and kneelers. There are two storeys and three bays. The central doorway has a rectangular fanlight, and the windows are sashes. The window above the doorway has a pediment containing a carved swag with initials and a date, and a sill on consoles.	II
Hardings; 54.28066°N 0.87164°W	—	18th century	A limestone house with quoins, a string course, and a pantile roof with coped gables and kneelers. There are two storeys and three bays. On the front are pivoted windows with raised surrounds and triple keystones, and the entrance is at the rear.	II
Manor Farmhouse and outbuildings 54.27938°N 0.87127°W		Mid 18th century	The farmhouse is in limestone with sandstone dressings, quoins, and a pantile roof with coped gables and moulded kneelers. There are two storeys and two bays. The central doorway has a triple-grooved keystone, and the windows are sashes. Attached are a barn with a cruck framed core, and a dairy to the right, and other outbuildings at the rear.	II
Moorfield; 54.28138°N 0.87205°W	—	Mid 18th century	The house is in sandstone with limestone dressings, quoins, a floor band, a moulded eaves cornice, and a slate roof with coped gables and kneelers. There are two storeys and three bays. The central doorway has a quoined surrounded and a keystone, and the windows are sashes in architraves.	II
House south of Orchard Cottage; 54.28209°N 0.87263°W	—	18th century	Two cottages, later combined into a house, it is in limestone, with sandstone quoins, and a pantile roof with coped gables and shaped kneelers. The windows are sashes, those in the lower floor horizontally-sliding. All the ground floor openings have segmental arches, including a blocked doorway.	II
Rose Marie Lodge; 54.28067°N 0.87209°W		18th century	The house, which has earlier origins, has a cruck-framed core, and is encased in limestone, with sandstone quoins, and a pantile roof with coped gables and kneelers. There are two storeys and four bays. The windows are horizontally-sliding sashes, those in the ground floor with cambered arches.	II
The Firs; 54.28054°N 0.87203°W	—	Mid 18th century	The house is in limestone with sandstone dressings, chamfered quoins, a floor band, a moulded eaves cornice, and a pantile roof with coped gables and kneelers. There are two storeys and an attic, and three bays. The doorway has Tuscan pilasters, a fanlight, a moulded archivolt with a keystone, and an open pediment. The windows on the front are sashes in moulded eared architraves with triple keystones, and at the rear are horizontally-sliding sashes and a tall staircase window.	II
Town End Farmhouse; 54.27930°N 0.87115°W	—	Mid 18th century	The farmhouse is in limestone, with sandstone quoins, a floor band, a moulded eaves course, and a pantile roof with coped gables and moulded kneelers. There are two storeys, three bays, and a two-storey rear extension. The central doorway has a rusticated surround, a channelled keystone and a detached lintel. The windows are sashes, the window above the doorway with a grooved triple keystone.	II
Appleton Mill Farmhouse and outbuildings 54.28096°N 0.85592°W		c. 1760	Originally a mill and a mill house, later a farmhouse and attached buildings, they are in sandstone with pantile roofs, coped gables and kneelers. The farmhouse has a stone plinth, chamfered quoins, a floor band, and a moulded eaves course. There are two storeys and three bays. The windows are sashes in raised surrounds with keystones. The outbuildings are attached to the right and at the rear.	II
East View; 54.27955°N 0.87131°W	—	Mid to late 18th century	The house is in limestone with chamfered sandstone quoins, and a pantile roof with coped gables. There are two storeys and three bays. The central doorway has a rectangular fanlight, the windows are sashes, and all the openings have raised surrounds and triple keystones.	II
The Moors Inn; 54.28177°N 0.87286°W		Late 18th century	The public house is in limestone with sandstone quoins and a pantile roof. There are two storeys and three bays. The windows are sashes, those in the upper floor horizontally-sliding.	II
West View; 54.27997°N 0.87116°W	—	Late 18th century	The house, at one time a post office, is in limestone, with quoins, a moulded eaves cornice, and a pantile roof with coped gables and kneelers. There are two storeys and three bays. The doorway is in the centre, the windows are sashes, and all the openings have painted wedge lintels with keystones.	II
Sellars House; 54.28139°N 0.87256°W	—	Early 19th century	A limestone house, rendered on the side, with a pantile roof and a coped gable on the right. There are two storeys and two bays. In the centre is a lattice gabled porch with scalloped bargeboards and a doorway with a rectangular fanlight, and the windows are sashes.	II
Ivy Dene; 54.28208°N 0.87305°W	—	Early to mid 19th century	A limestone house with sandstone dressings, and a pantile roof with coped gables and kneelers. There are two storeys and three bays. The central doorway has a rectangular fanlight, and the windows are sashes, the window above the doorway narrower.	II
Christ Church; 54.28322°N 0.87291°W		1863–65	The church, designed by J. Loughborough Pearson, is built in limestone with slate roofs. It consists of a nave with a narthex, north and south aisles, a chancel with an apse and a north chapel, and a southeast steeple. The steeple has a tower with two-light bell openings, shafts and lucarnes, and a spire. At the west end, the narthex projects between buttresses, and the entrance arch has three orders, shafts and foliate capitals. Above it, in the gable, is a rose window, and the windows elsewhere are lancets.	I
Appleton House and Mullion Court; 54.28347°N 0.87322°W	—	1865	Originally the parsonage, later divided into two houses, it was designed by J. Loughborough Pearson, and is in limestone with decorative banding and coped gables. There are two storeys, a range of four bays, a projecting gabled bay to the right, and a later gabled wing further to the right. In the projecting bay is a doorway with a pointed arch, the windows are mullioned, some with pointed-arched heads, and all the openings have quoined jambs.	II
School House and Village Hall; 54.27980°N 0.87177°W		1865	The schoolmaster's house and village school were designed by J. Loughborough Pearson, and later used as a village hall and a private house. They are in limestone, with some timber framing on the house, and have slate roofs. The hall to the right has the gable end facing the street, with buttresses, a three-light window, and a bellcote on the gable, set diagonally, with an octagonal spire, and on the right return is a porch. The house has two storeys and a cross-wing, the upper storey jettied and timber framed with a half-hipped gable, containing a four-light mullioned and transomed window.	II
War memorial 54.28304°N 0.87312°W		c. 1865	The war memorial, which is set into the churchyard wall of Christ Church, originated as a well-head. It is in sandstone, and consists of an arch with a gabled parapet. After the First World War, a tablet inscribed with the names of those lost in the war was set within the arch. Later the rear of the arch was walled, and a replacement tablet was inserted. The front of the arch has been filled by a grill.	II
Telephone kiosk 54.28154°N 0.87237°W		1935	The K6 type telephone kiosk outside Ryecroft was designed by Giles Gilbert Scott. Constructed in cast iron with a square plan and a dome, it has three unperforated crowns in the top panels.	II
