= Aislaby, Ryedale =

Hamlet in North Yorkshire, England

Coordinates: 54°15′40″N 0°48′37″W

Aislaby
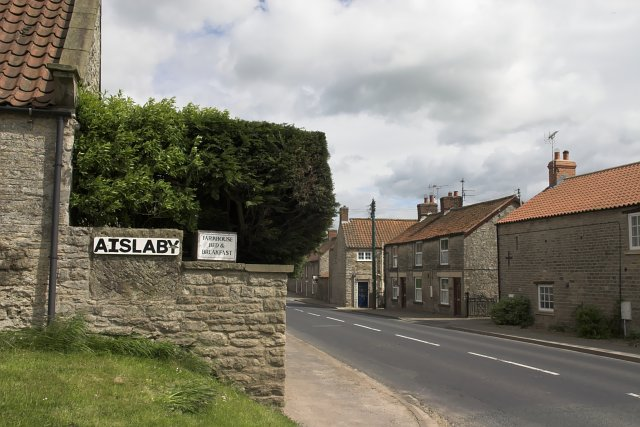
- Aislaby

- Location within North Yorkshire
- OS grid reference: SE747870
- Unitary authority: North Yorkshire
- Ceremonial county: North Yorkshire
- Region: Yorkshire and the Humber
- Country: England
- Sovereign state: United Kingdom
- Post town: PICKERING
- Postcode district: YO18
- Police: North Yorkshire
- Fire: North Yorkshire
- Ambulance: Yorkshire
- UK Parliament: Thirsk and Malton

Aislaby is a hamlet and civil parish near the English town of Pickering, North Yorkshire. It lies on the A170 to the west of Pickering between Wrelton and Middleton.

== History ==
The hamlet is mentioned in the Domesday Book and was known as Aslachesbi. In 1066 the land was owned by Gospatric and had 2 ploughlands.

The etymology of the name comes from Old Norse bȳ (farm or village) added to the name of the ownerAslakr.

Aislaby Hall was built in the village in 1742, and is now grade II* listed.

== Demographics ==
The population of the civil parish was less than 100 at the 2011 Census. Details are included in the civil parish of Cropton.

Historical population

Year	Pop.	±%
1881	134	—
1891	112	−16.4%
1901	108	−3.6%
1911	94	−13.0%
1921	82	−12.8%

Year	Pop.	±%
1931	90	+9.8%
1941	no census	—
1951	93	—
1961	66	−29.0%

Source: GB Historical GIS / University of Portsmouth

== Governance ==
The hamlet is within the Thirsk and Malton Parliamentary constituency and the Kirkbymoorside and Dales Electoral Ward of North Yorkshire Council. The hamlet is part of the civil parish of Aislaby, Middleton and Wrelton. From 1974 to 2023 it was part of the district of Ryedale, it is now administered by the unitary North Yorkshire Council.

== Community ==
The hamlet lies within the Primary Education catchment area for Pickering Junior School and the Secondary Education catchment area for Lady Lumley's School in Pickering.

== See also ==
- Listed buildings in Aislaby, Ryedale
