= Rosedale Priory =

Former priory in Yorkshire

Coordinates: 54.3537°N 0.8880°W

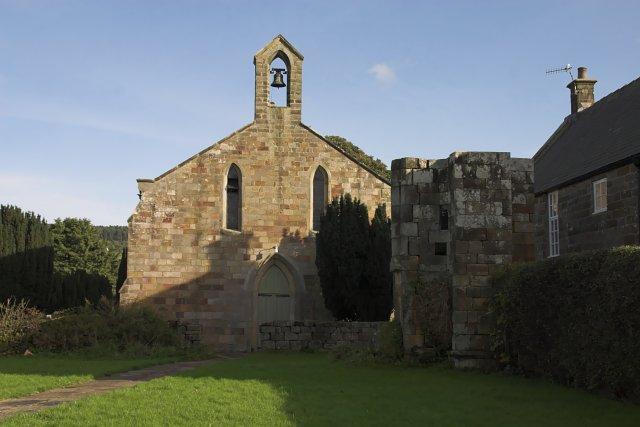
Remains of Rosedale Abbey with the Church of St Mary and St Laurence behind

Rosedale Priory was a priory in the village of Rosedale Abbey, North Yorkshire, England that was founded c. 1150–1199, probably by William of Rosedale in 1154. By the time the priory was suppressed in 1535, it had one prioress and eight nuns. The religious house in Rosedale was a priory and not an abbey, despite the village being given the name Rosedale Abbey, and it is unclear why this came about.

== History ==
The priory was founded during the reign of Henry II and finished during the reign of Richard the Lionheart. The land was donated by Robert de Stuteville, so that nuns from the Benedictine order could worship and farm the surrounding land.

After the dissolution of the monasteries during the reign of King Henry VIII, the priory was abandoned in 1536. Much of the fabric remained until the mid 19th century, when it is thought that most of the stones were re-used in the construction of the village buildings, including the adjacent church of St Mary and St Lawrence. Identifiable fragments can be found. Window jambs have been used as gate posts in the lane next to The Milburn Arms pub and a winding stair tread has been used as roof coping in a nearby cottage. The only ruin left standing is a 13th-century turret which rises to 20 feet (6.1 m) high and is just to the west of the present church. The turret was grade II listed in 1953. It probably led from the nave of the chapel up to a dormitory. The present school and playground occupy part of what would have been the cloister.

== See also ==
- Listed buildings in Rosedale East Side
