= Aislaby =

Aislaby may refer to:

- Aislaby, County Durham, in the borough of Stockton-on-Tees and ceremonial county of County Durham
- Aislaby, Ryedale, near Pickering, North Yorkshire
- Aislaby, Scarborough, near Whitby, North Yorkshire
