= St Gregory's Church, Cropton =

Church in Cropton, North Yorkshire, England

Coordinates: 54°17′37″N 0°50′22″W

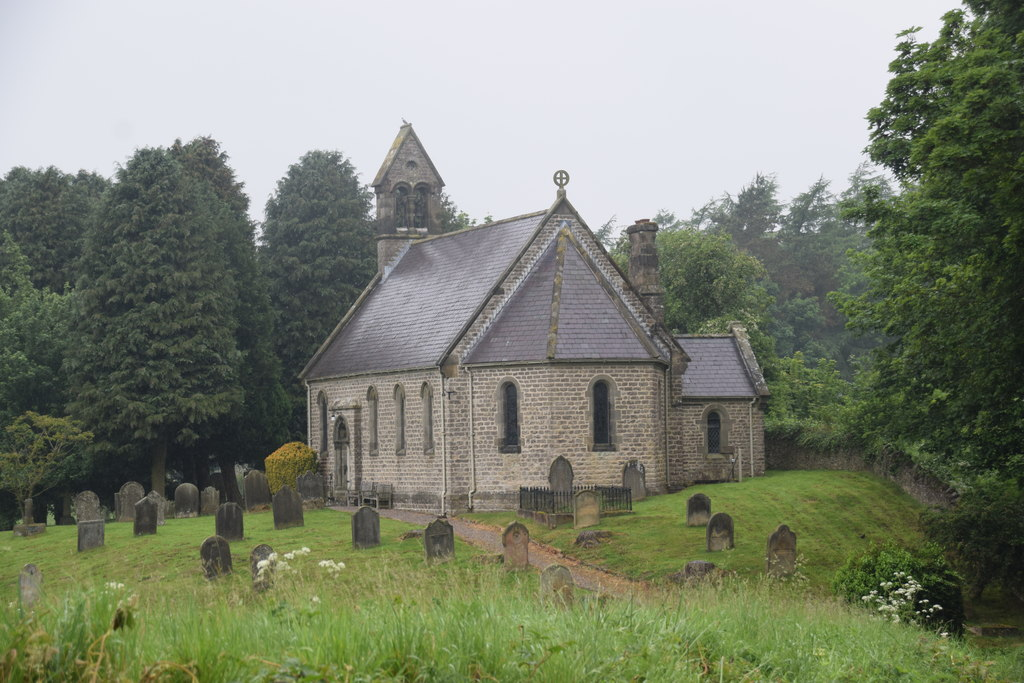
The church, in 2018

St Gregory's Church is the parish church of Cropton, a village in North Yorkshire, in England.

This was a mediaeval church in Cropton, which burned down in about 1840. Rebuilding took place between 1844 and 1855, to a design by J. B. and W. Atkinson, in the Norman Revival style. It was long a chapel of ease to St Andrew's Church, Middleton, but in 1986 it was given its own parish. The church has been grade II listed since 1953.

The church is built of limestone on a plinth, with a slate roof. It consists of a nave and a chancel with a polygonal apse in one unit, a south porch and a north vestry. On the west gable is a gabled bellcote containing two round-arched openings with moulded surrounds, a centre shaft with a scalloped capital, and a coved hood mould. The windows have round-arched heads, quoins, and coved hood moulds. Inside the church is a 12th-century font.

== See also ==
- Listed buildings in Cropton
