= Listed buildings in Marton, Ryedale =

Marton is a civil parish in the county of North Yorkshire, England. It contains nine listed buildings that are recorded in the National Heritage List for England. All the listed buildings are designated at Grade II, the lowest of the three grades, which is applied to "buildings of national importance and special interest". The parish contains the village of Marton and the surrounding area. All the listed buildings are in the village, and consist of houses and associated structures, a bridge, a church hall, and a telephone kiosk.

== Buildings ==
Name and location	Photograph	Date	Notes
The Aspens; 54.23957°N 0.87540°W	—	1728	A house with an outbuilding to the left, they are in limestone with quoins and a pantile roof. There are two storeys, the house has three bays, and the outbuilding has two. On the front of the house is a doorway and horizontally-sliding sash windows, and the outbuilding has a stable door and a casement window.
Marton Bridge; 54.23923°N 0.87688°W		Late 18th century	The bridge carries Marton Road over the River Seven. It is in sandstone, and consists of a single semicircular arch. It has moulding on the downstream side, and a chamfered band under a plain parapet, which is raked in the centre.
The Croft and outbuildings 54.23974°N 0.87455°W	—	Late 18th century	A house and an attached outbuilding converted for residential use, in limestone with a pantile roof. There are two storeys and four bays. On the front are two doorways, and the windows are horizontally-sliding sashes.
West Garth; 54.23826°N 0.87898°W	—	Late 18th century	The house is in limestone with a pantile roof. There are two storeys and three bays. The doorway has a divided fanlight, and the windows are horizontally-sliding sashes. The ground floor openings have painted lintels.
Outbuilding west of West Garth; 54.23829°N 0.87916°W	—	Late 18th century	A range of stables in limestone, extended in red brick, with a pantile roof. There is a single storey and three bays, and it contains three stable doors with lintels.
Rosedene; 54.23934°N 0.87502°W	—	1784	A house with a shop added in the 19th century, later combined into one house. Both have two storeys, the shop lower, two bays, quoins and pantile roofs, the house with coped gables and shaped kneelers. The house is in limestone with sandstone quoins, and a moulded eaves course. The central doorway is round-arched, with a fanlight, imposts, and a rusticated keystone, above which is an initialled datestone. The windows are sashes with triple keystones and wedge lintels. The former shop is in whitewashed brick, and contains sash windows, with a continuous lintel over the ground floor windows.
Fairview House; 54.23937°N 0.87466°W	—	Early 19th century	The house is in limestone with sandstone quoins, and a pantile roof. There are two storeys and three bays. The central doorway has a divided fanlight, and above it is a round-arched sash window with imposts and a painted archivolt. The other windows are sashes with painted lintels.
Church Hall; 54.23952°N 0.87603°W		1851	A school, later a church hall, in limestone, with an extension in red brick and a slate roof, the gable end facing the street. Steps with railings lead up to a doorway with a plain surround, a pointed arch, and a moulded hood mould. To the right is a segmental-headed window with a moulded surround containing three cusped pointed lights with chamfered mullions, a moulded hood mould, and a moulded impost band. To its right is a war memorial panel. The gable has bargeboards, and is surmounted by a pedimented bellcote. In the right return are two square-headed three-light windows.
Telephone kiosk 54.23959°N 0.87501°W		1935	The K6 type telephone kiosk was designed by Giles Gilbert Scott. Constructed in cast iron with a square plan and a dome, it has three unperforated crowns in the top panels.
