= Ironstone mining in Rosedale =

Ironstone mining in Rosedale, North Yorkshire, England

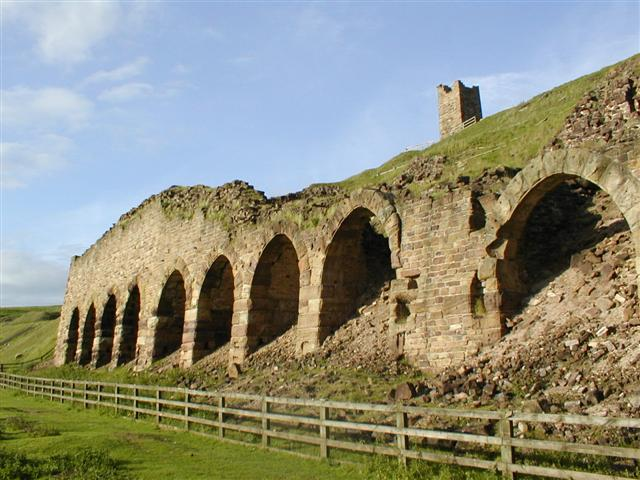
- Calcining Kilns, Rosedale East Ironstone Mine

- Location within North Yorkshire
- Location: Rosedale, North Yorkshire, England; 54.357°N 0.928°W
- Products: Ironstone
- Production: 560,000 tonnes (620,000 tons)
- Financial year: 1873
- Type: See list
- Opened: 1856
- Closed: 1929

The Ironstone mining in Rosedale, was a major mining concern, in Rosedale, North Yorkshire, England. It flourished in the 19th century and ceased in the early 20th, though smaller scale iron workings were in use through the Middle Ages. The ironstone from Rosedale was typically rated at a higher iron ore concentration in the rock than other mines in the Cleveland and North Yorkshire area.

The first exports from the dale were by horse and cart, but by 1861, the standard gauge Rosedale Railway was built, 12 miles (19 km) across the moors to the north to connect the mines with the smelters on Teesside, Tyneside or in County Durham. As the industrialisation of the dale increased, many people moved in to get jobs in the mines, changing the dale from one predominantly dedicated to agriculture, to one geared up to mining. This rush led the local population to refer to the new mining venture as the Yorkshire Klondyke.

The mines closed down from the 1880s onwards, and all mining activity had ceased by 1929, which led to the closure of the railway.

== History ==
The valley and moorland at Rosedale, some 10 miles (16 km) north west of Pickering, was known to have been worked for iron for hundreds of years (at least 600 years before the 19th century ironstone mining boom); in 1209, Robert de Stuteville granted the use of his meadow in Rosedale to the nuns of Rosedale Abbey. However, the grant stipulated that the forge remain in his ownership. Stone from the quarries on the east side of Rosedale were used in the repair of roads in 1851. This led to an appraisal of the stone and it was found to have a higher concentration of iron ore within the stone than that of the main Cleveland Seam (worked around Eston, Brotton etc.), typically 45-50% over 30-35%. This led to the ironstone being known as Magnetic, and the mines at Rosedale were sometimes referred to as the Magnetic Mines.

The discovery of thick seams of ironstone outcropping near the surface in Rosedale, caused a large increase in the population. In 1851, 548 people lived in Rosedale Abbey, which by 1871, had increased to 2,839. This in turn, developed the village of Rosedale Abbey beyond what it had before; more schools, chapels, and shops, even a resident police officer. This upsurge in employment, and the influx of people from outside the dale to work in the ironstone industry, led to it being called the Yorkshire Klondyke, and locally, it is still referred to that in the modern era. In 1856, the Rosedale Mining Company started operations at the Hollins and Low Works drift mines on the west side of the dale, and had expanded their operation into the east side of the valley (Rosedale East) by 1860, and changed their name to the Rosedale & Ferryhill Iron Company. Although the ore needed roasting to drive off the carbonate, the seam on the east side was 13 feet (4 m) thick.

The kilns at Rosedale West (Bank Top) were built in 1856 and took 18 months to construct. The kilns allowed the mined and quarries ore to be roasted (calcined) with coal which drove off the impurities and increased the percentage of iron and thus, made it cheaper to be transported in bulk via the railway. This was partly due to the nature of how the railway was built. Instead of purchasing the land outright, the landowners were granted wayleaves, which meant they were entitled to a payment for every tonne of mineral carried, so the ore was roasted to prevent waste material being carried and levied upon. The kilns at Rosedale East were located at Low Baring.

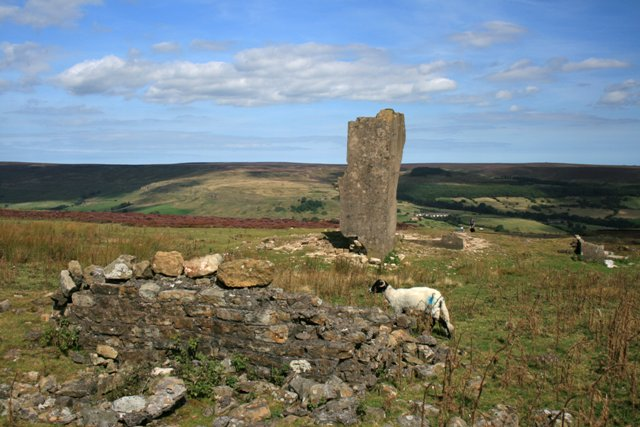
Sherriff's Pit ruins

The railway was opened up in 1861 via the steep incline at Ingleby Greenhow, which connected the line with the North Eastern Railway line at Battersby Junction railway station. The railway was extended into East Rosedale in 1865. Prior to the arrival of the railway, ore was taken to Pickering by horse and cart and was railed via Malton and Pilmoor to the Derwent Ironworks in Consett. The use of horse and cart to transport ore (nearly 40,000 tonnes (44,000 tons) in 1860–1861), was the last large-scale use of this type of transport in the area, though some smaller concerns did still use horse transport. Before the railway's arrival, production was limited to between 300 tonnes (330 tons) and 4,000 tonnes (4,400 tons) per year, but in January 1861, a tramway was built connecting Hollins Farm mine to Bank Top (Rosedale West), that enabled production to vastly increase its output to over 200,000 tonnes (220,000 tons) in 1862. Initially, coal mined at Rosedale Head was used to roast the ore, but later, coal from County Durham with a higher calorific value was used.

The Kitchen's and Garbutt's workings, both named after the farms they were discovered on, operated between 1853 and 1880. It is estimated that in their 23-year operating life, they produced 3,000,000 tonnes (3,300,000 tons) of ore. The steep hill from the village of Rosedale Abbey to the site of the kilns at Rosedale West became known as Chimney Bank, due to the presence of the 100-foot (30 m) high chimney at the top of the hill. The chimney, which actually vented fumes from the stationary winding house boiler room, was demolished in 1972.

The combined output from the mines reached a peak in 1873, when 560,000 tonnes (620,000 tons) was shipped down the incline for onward transportation to the ironworks. In the 68 years that the railway was open, it has been estimated that it transported over 11,000,000 tonnes (12,000,000 tons) of ironstone for the smelters on Teesside and the North East. The Rosedale & Ferryhill Iron Company collapsed in 1879 after a slump in the iron market, and all the mines ceased activity, with 1880 showing no tonnage moved. Some of the mines were re-opened in 1881 under the control of the Carlton Iron Company. In 1885, the Rosedale West mines (Low Works, Lane Head, Hollins Farm) were officially closed, but the kilns were kept open roasting the ore from other mines (Sheriff's Pit). The Magnetic Mines workings at Kitchen's and Garbutt's had ceased operations in 1880. A study of employment at Rosedale West found that in 1896, of the 121 people working there, 110 were listed as 'working underground', with 77 in 1899 and 80 in 1900.

Several proposals for light railways into Rosedale were proposed, but none came to fruition. The last one put forward was in 1900, when a line extending from Sinnington railway station on the Gilling and Pickering line with an aim to get within 1.5 miles (2.4 km) of the village of Rosedale Abbey.

The mines closed progressively until final use of the kilns at Rosedale East came in 1926. This led to the closure of the railway and the abandonment of the kilns. However, a small reprieve came for the railway as dust from the calcination process (calcine), was exported from the kilns sporadically until 1929. The closure of the industry was partly due to the loss of available ore, but also in part to the General Strike of 1926, where iron prices were very low, so places like Rosedale became unprofitable.

== Post-closure ==
The various buildings and structures were demolished; the community that had built up around Blakey Junction (where the railway line diverged to Rosedale West and East), had its last house taken down in 1955. The kilns at Rosedale East are now scheduled monuments.

== Locations ==
Ironstone Mines in Rosedale
Name	Type	Dates	Location	Notes	Ref
Farndale	Drift	1873–1881	54.369°N 0.952°W	Not strictly in Rosedale, but was located quite close to Blakey Junction, high on the moorland watershed that separates Rosedale in the east, with Farndale, in the west. The mine was grouped with the other Rosedale mines on account of it working the same seams and being linked via the Rosedale Railway for its output.	
Hollins	Drift	1856–1885	54.341°N 0.881°W	Connected to Rosedale West via an inclined tramway that ran for 3,000 feet (900 m) with a winding house set back 260 feet (80 m) from the incline head.	
Lane Head	Drift	1873–1881	54.347°N 0.889°W	The exact location is unknown, but the site was recorded in a mineral statistics publication between 1873 and 1881.	
Rosedale East	Drift/Kilns	1864–1926	54.380°N 0.915°W	Modern-day surveys have estimated that Rosedale east covered nearly 2.5 miles (4 km) of hillside.	
Rosedale West	Drift/Kilns	1853–1885	54.343°N 0.890°W	Known as the Magnetic Mines, the first mining operation was in 1853, pre-dating the railway. At Rosedale West, two areas of mining were in operation, Kitchen (or Kitching's) and Garbutt's deposits.	
Sheriff's Pit (Note: Sometimes referred to as Sherrif's Pit or Sheriff's Mine.)	Shaft	1857–1911	54.357°N 0.928°W	Named after one of the NERs promoters, the shaft was 270 feet (82 m) deep and the seam averaged almost 6 feet (1.8 m) thick. The first ironstone mining here was a drift to the north east directly into the hill, labelled on mapping as West Mines. The headgear for the shaft was demolished upon closure in 1911.	

== See also ==
- Ironstone mining in Cleveland and North Yorkshire
