= Christ Church, Appleton-le-Moors =

Parish church in North Yorkshire, England

Coordinates: 54.2832°N 0.8729°W

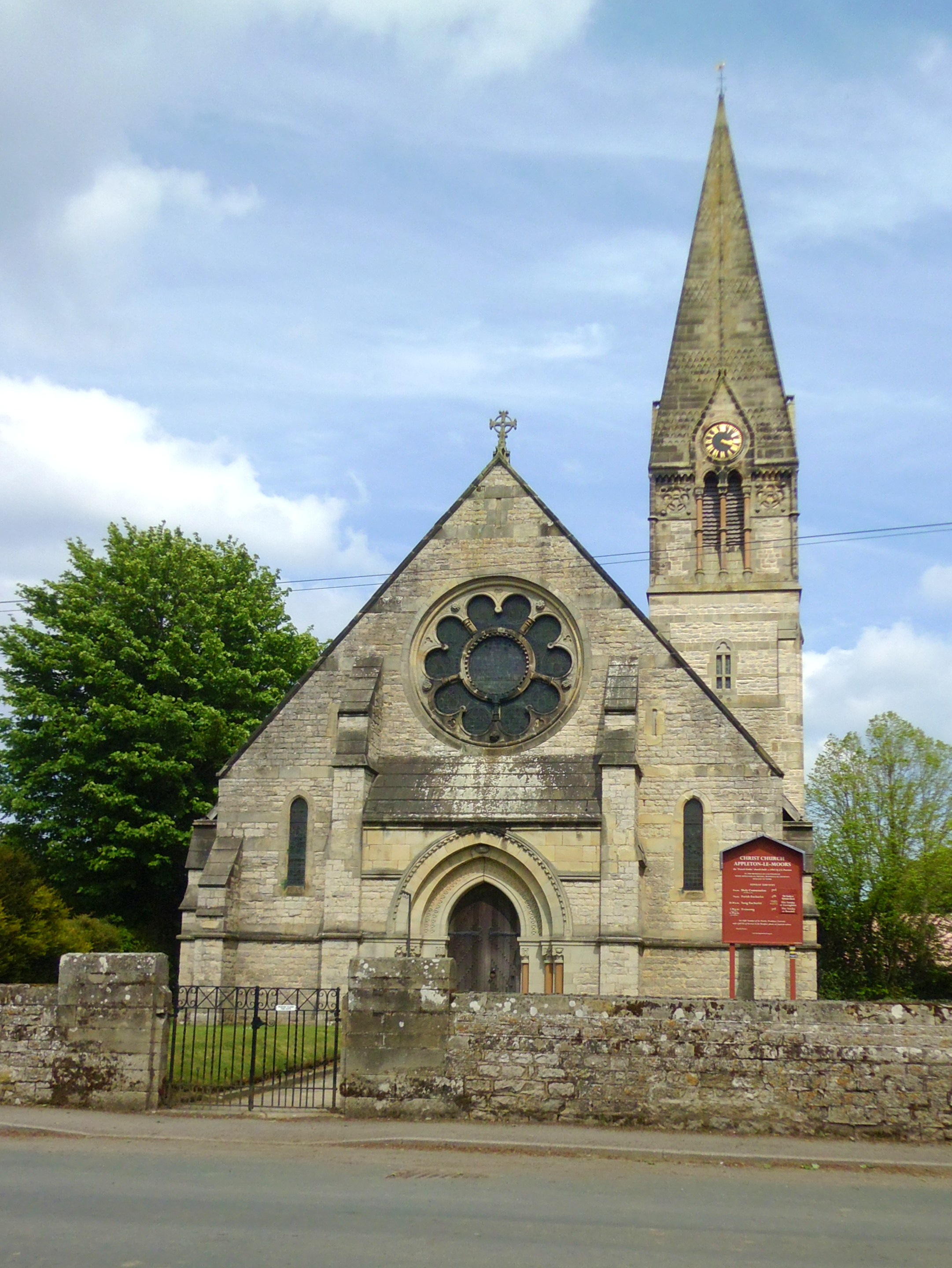
The church, in 2013

Christ Church is the parish church of Appleton-le-Moors, a village in North Yorkshire, in England.

Appleton-le-Moors was historically in the parish of Lastingham. In the 1860s, Mrs J. Shepherd commissioned a church as a memorial to her husband. It was constructed from 1863 to 1866, to a design by John Loughborough Pearson. It is in the early French Gothic style, and was Grade I listed in 1985.

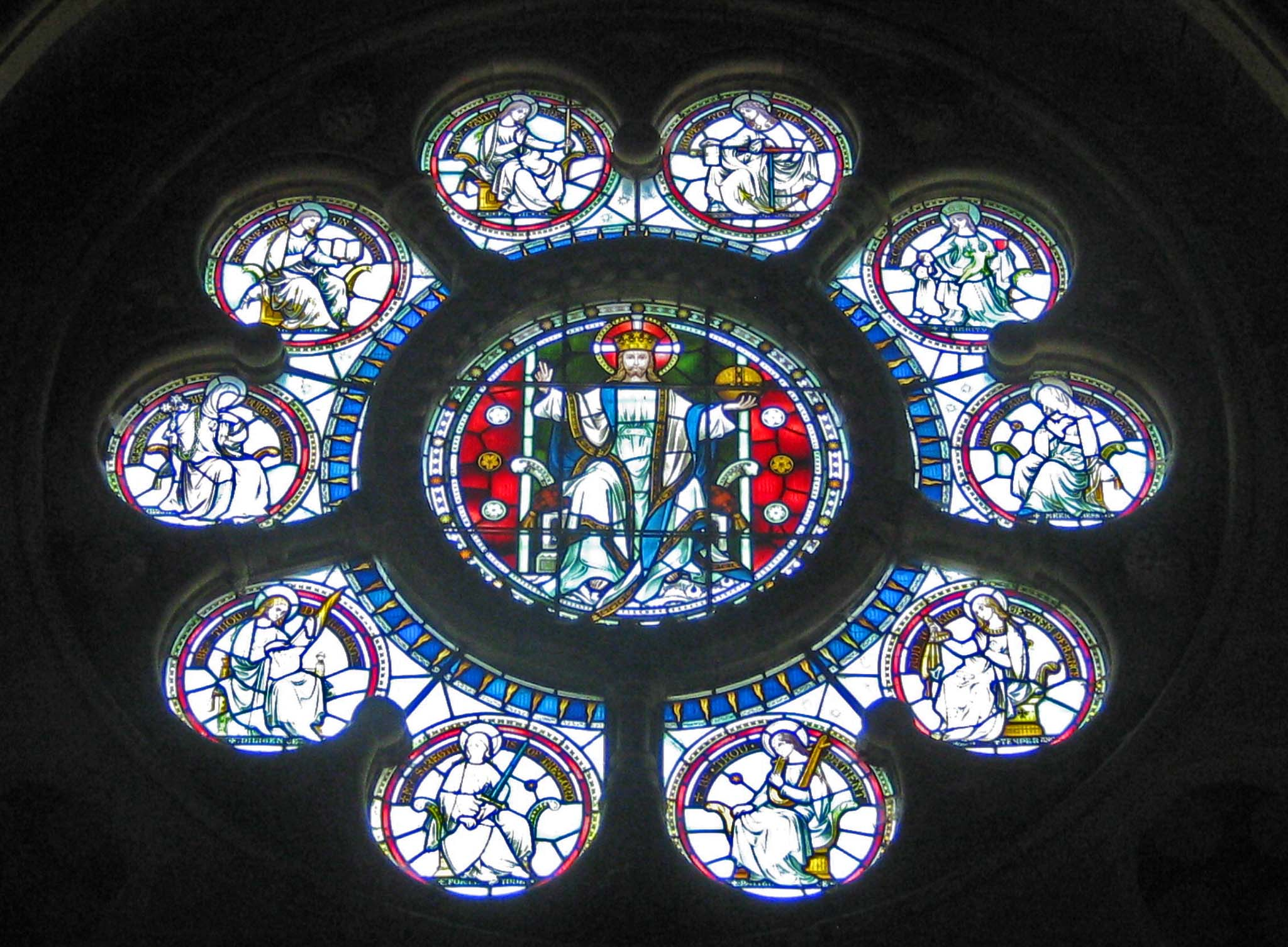
The rose window

The church is built in limestone with slate roofs, and some of its interior details are in Rosedale ironstone. It consists of a nave with a narthex, north and south aisles, a chancel with an apse and a north chapel, and a southeast steeple. The steeple has a tower with two-light bell openings, shafts and lucarnes, and a pyramidal spire. At the west end, the narthex projects between buttresses, and the entrance arch has three orders, shafts and foliate capitals. Above it, in the gable, is a large rose window, with a botanical theme, filled with stained glass by Clayton and Bell which depicts Christian virtues. The windows elsewhere are lancets. A west porch shelters two doors into the church, between which sits the font. Inside, there is a hammerbeam roof, and pink sgraffito decoration in a Classical style, by Clayton & Bell, who also designed the stained glass.
