= Listed buildings in Middleton, east North Yorkshire =

Middleton is a civil parish in the county of North Yorkshire, England. It contains nine listed buildings that are recorded in the National Heritage List for England. Of these, one is listed at Grade I, the highest of the three grades, and the others are at Grade II, the lowest grade. The parish contains the village of Middleton and the surrounding countryside. The listed buildings consist of a church, houses, farmhouses and associated structures.

== Key ==
Grade	Criteria
I	Buildings of exceptional interest, sometimes considered to be internationally important
II	Buildings of national importance and special interest

== Buildings ==
Name and location	Photograph	Date	Notes	Grade
St Andrew's Church; 54.25876°N 0.80090°W		11th century	The church has been altered and extended through the centuries, including a restoration and alterations in 1886 by C. Hodgson Fowler. It is built in sandstone, the nave has a lead roof, the chancel has a slate roof, and the roof of the porch is in stone slate. The church consists of a nave with a clerestory, north and south aisles, a south porch, a chancel, and a west tower. In the west front of the tower is a blocked round-arched doorway with imposts, and the crown of the arch broken by vesica-shaped window. The bell openings are paired, in recessed pointed arches with shafts, and above is a corbel table and an embattled parapet. The porch is gabled and has a round-arched entrance, above which is a sundial. Inside the church is a collection of 10th-century sculpture.	I
Church Farmhouse; 54.25889°N 0.80028°W	—	Early 17th century	Two attached houses, later converted for other uses, in sandstone, partly on a chamfered plinth, with a pantile roof. There are two storeys and four bays. The openings have been altered. On the front is a doorway with a fanlight, a stable door, slit vents and a lifting door. The rear contains a blocked doorway, mullioned windows, and a horizontally-sliding sash window.	II
Beech View; 54.25790°N 0.80154°W		Early 18th century	The house is in limestone on a rendered plinth and has a pantile roof. There are two storeys and four bays. The main doorway has a painted stone lintel, and at the right end is a doorway with a timber lintel. In the left two bays are bow windows, and the other windows are horizontally-sliding sashes.	II
Middleton Hall; 54.25790°N 0.80027°W		Early to mid-18th century	The house is in sandstone at the front, the rear and sides are in pink and cream brick, the wing is in red brick, and the roofs are slated. The main block has chamfered quoins, a moulded eaves cornice, a balustraded parapet with a central pediment containing a roundel, and a mansard roof. There are two storeys and five bays, the middle bay projecting. Steps lead up to a central round-arched doorway with engaged fluted Doric columns, a fanlight, a keystone, and an open pediment. The windows are sash window in architraves, the window above the doorway also with a keystone and a pediment, and all with sills on grooved consoles. At the rear is a Venetian stair window. The wing has two storeys and two bays, it contains a modillion cornice, and has a hipped roof.	II
Green Farmhouse; 54.25756°N 0.79979°W	—	Mid-18th century	A farmhouse and an outbuilding, later incorporated into the farmhouse, in limestone on a sandstone plinth, with quoins, and a roof of pantile and slate with coped gables and shaped kneelers. There are two storeys, two bays, and a lower bay to the right. In the right bay is a doorway with a fanlight and horizontally-sliding sash windows, the lower floor openings with wedge lintels. The left two bays contain sash windows with wedge lintels and keystones.	II
High Nova Farmhouse and barn 54.28514°N 0.79682°W		18th century	The farmhouse and attached barn are in sandstone, with a moulded eaves cornice and gutter, and a pantile roof with a coped gable and shaped kneeler on the right. There are two storeys, an L-shaped plan, three bays, and a lower single bay on the left, the two right bays forming the barn. The barn contains a sable door, and external steps lead up to a loft door. The house has a doorway and sash windows.	II
Manor House; 54.25718°N 0.79892°W	—	Mid-18th century	The house is in limestone. with a moulded eaves cornice, and a pantile roof with coped gables and shaped kneelers. There are two storeys, three bays and a rear wing. In the centre is a doorway with a fanlight, flanked by canted bay windows. The upper floor contains sash windows with heavy lintels.	II
The Willows; 54.25674°N 0.79884°W	—	Late 18th century	The house is in limestone on a plinth, with chamfered quoins, a floor band, a moulded eaves cornice, and pantile roof with coped gables and shaped kneelers. There are two storeys and three bays. In the centre is a gabled porch, and the windows are sashes with keystones.	II
Middleton House and garage 54.25815°N 0.80217°W	—	Early 19th century	The house and attached coach house, later converted into a garage, is in sandstone, with chamfered quoins, sill bands, and a slate roof. The house has two storeys and an attic and three bays, a two-storey two-bay wing to the right, and the garage further to the right. In the centre of the main block is a doorway with a fanlight, and a bracketed cornice hood, flanked by canted bay windows. On the middle floor are sash windows, the outer ones with wedge lintels and keystones, and the top floor contains casement windows. The wing contains a doorway with a fanlight and sash windows, all with wedge lintels and keystones. In the garage is a chamfered segmental arch.	II
