= St Mary and St Laurence's Church, Rosedale Abbey =

Church in Rosedale Abbey, North Yorkshire, England

Coordinates: 54°21′14″N 0°53′16″W

The church, in 2026

St Mary and St Laurence's Church (also sometimes referred to as St Lawrence's) is the parish church of Rosedale Abbey, a village in North Yorkshire, in England.

Rosedale Priory was founded in the 12th century, and its chapel was rebuilt in the 14th century. After the Dissolution of the Monasteries, it was retained as a place of worship for the village, becoming a chapel of ease to St Andrew's Church, Middleton. In 1839, the chapel was demolished, and a new church was built, to a design by Lewis Vulliamy, incorporating one window from the old building. The cost of £665 was met by public subscription. Every subscription is recorded on the panels of the wall beneath the gallery. In 1876 (although other sources say 1879), the church was given its own parish, and perhaps at this time, a gallery was installed inside. The building was grade II listed in 1987.

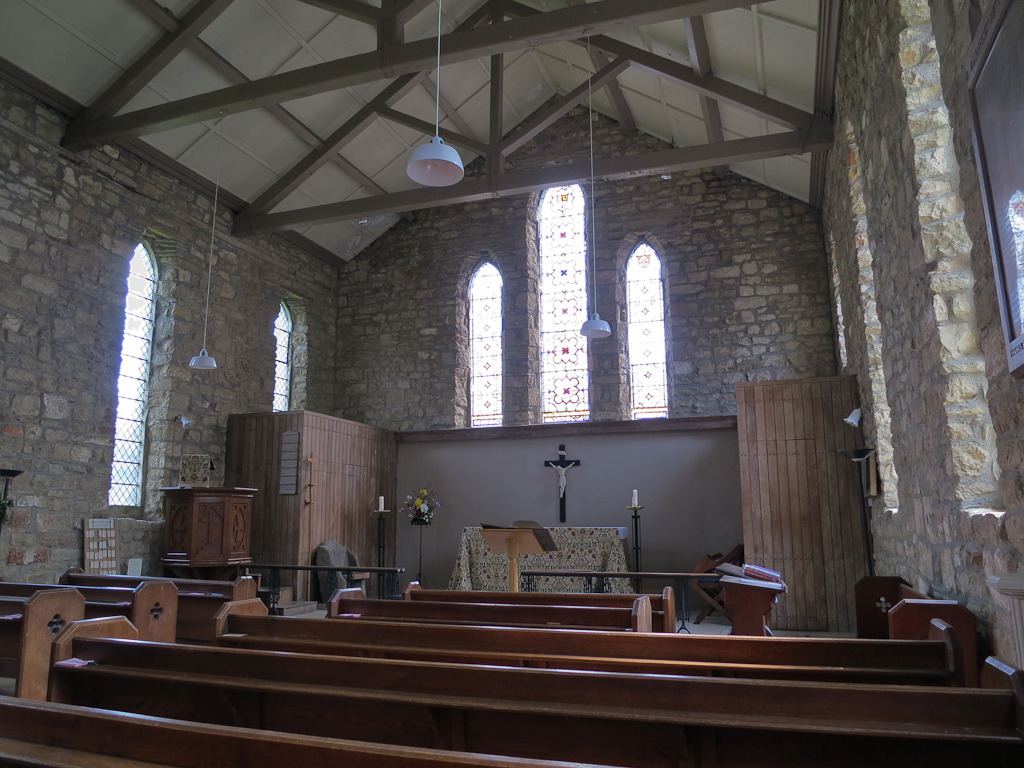
View east inside the church

The church is built of sandstone with a slate roof. It consists of a nave and a chancel in a single unit, and a south vestry. On the west gable is a gabled bellcote with a pointed bell opening. The windows are tall lancets, the 14th-century window having two lights. Inside, the pews were made in 1907 by Robert Thompson, while the oak lectern is 19th century and was made in the Netherlands. There is a "bishop's chair" made of stones from the priory, and an old gravestone with a cross.

In the 1970s the sanctuary was extended, and two side vestries created. Pews, by Mousey Thompson, were repositioned to create the central aisle and in the 1980s a screen was placed to divide the church and create space for meetings and Sunday School. In 1984, Rosedale became part of the United Benefice of Lastingham, but remains its own parish.

== See also ==
- Listed buildings in Rosedale East Side
