= Listed buildings in Cropton =

Cropton is a civil parish in the county of North Yorkshire, England. It contains 22 listed buildings that are recorded in the National Heritage List for England. All the listed buildings are designated at Grade II, the lowest of the three grades, which is applied to "buildings of national importance and special interest". The parish contains the village of Cropton and the surrounding countryside. Most of the listed buildings are houses, cottages and associated structures, farmhouses and farm buildings, and the others include a church, the remains of a churchyard cross, a bridge, a cornmill, a guidestone and two hydrants.

== Buildings ==
Name and location	Photograph	Date	Notes
Stump of churchyard cross 54.29357°N 0.83956°W		Medieval	The remains of the cross are in the churchyard of St Gregory's Church, and are in stone. They consist of a circular base about 0.3 metres (1 ft 0 in) high, and a chamfered shaft about 0.8 metres (2 ft 7 in) high.
The Green; 54.29086°N 0.83886°W	—	Early 17th century (probable)	The end of a longhouse converted into a cottage, it has a cruck framed core, encased in stone, and a pantile roof. There are two storeys and two bays, the right bay partly obscured by a building projecting forward. The doorway has a quoined surround. To its right is a casement window and a three-light chamfered mullioned window, and the upper floor contains a horizontally-sliding sash window.
Court House; 54.29273°N 0.83848°W		17th century (probable)	The house is in sandstone, and has a pantile roof with a coped gable and kneeler on the right. There are two storeys and three bays. The windows are casements, with painted lintels, and the entrance is through a porch at the rear. Between the upper floor windows is an inscribed datestone.
The Old Cottage; 54.29220°N 0.83800°W	—	17th century	The house has a cruck framed core, and was raised in the 18th century. It is mainly in sandstone and was raised in limestone, the front range has a thatched roof, hipped on the left, and elsewhere there is a pantile roof. There are two storeys and an L-shaped plan, with a front range of two bays. In the right gable end is a porch, and the windows are casements. Inside the house is an inglenook fireplace and cruck trusses.
Cruck Cottage; 54.29105°N 0.83875°W	—	Early 18th century	The house has a cruck frame, encased in limestone and rendered, and has a pantile roof with coped gables and kneelers. There are two storeys and two bays, a single-storey rear outshut, and later rear outbuildings. The entrance is in the right gable end, and the windows are horizontally-sliding sashes. Inside, there is an inglenook fireplace, and a single cruck truss.
Nutholme; 54.28059°N 0.85806°W	—	Mid 18th century	A house in whitewashed sandstone, with a pantile roof and a coped gable on the right. There are two storeys and four bays. The house contains doorways with timber lintels, fixed fire windows, and sash windows, some of which are horizontally-sliding. At the rear is an initialled datestone with the date of remodelling.
Old Manor House; 54.29260°N 0.83850°W	—	Mid to late 18th century	A pair of cottages combined into one house and refronted in 1878. It is in sandstone with a pantile roof, two storeys and four bays. On the front is a doorway, cross windows in the ground floor, and inserted dormers above. The windows have diamond lattice glazing, and the ground floor openings have painted lintels and keystones. In the centre of the upper floor is a datestone with the date of alterations.
Corner Cottage; 54.29057°N 0.84141°W		Late 18th century	A house and a cottage in sandstone, with a pantile roof, coped gables and shaped kneelers. There are two storeys, three bays, and a rear outshut. On the front are two doorways with gabled trellis porches, and the windows are horizontally-sliding sashes, those in the ground floor with painted wedge lintels.
Rose Cottage; 54.29280°N 0.83781°W		Late 18th century	The house incorporates a 1695 building. It is in limestone, with quoins, and a pantile roof with coped gables and shaped kneelers. There are two storeys and three bays. On the front is a doorway with a painted quoined surround, a fanlight, and an inscribed and painted lintel. The windows are sashes with painted lintels, and in the upper floor is a triangular sunk panel inscribed "ROSE".
Seven Bridge; 54.29887°N 0.85563°W		Late 18th to early 19th century	The bridge carries Bent Lane over a stream. It is in stone, and consists of a single elliptical arch. The bridge has voussoirs, moulded pilaster buttresses, a raised band, and a raked parapet with flat coping. The buttresses rise to form piers with shallow hipped caps.
Cropton Mill; 54.29081°N 0.85416°W	—	Early 19th century	A corn watermill and an attached house in sandstone, with quoins, and a hipped pantile roof with a weathercock. There are two storeys and an attic, the house has two bays, with a two-storey two-bay extension to the right, and the mill forms a cross-wing on the left. The windows are sashes, in the attic is a horizontally-sliding sash window, and the extension contains a canted bay window.
Holme House; 54.29139°N 0.83859°W	—	Early 19th century	The house is in limestone, with sandstone quoins, and a pantile roof with coped gables and shaped kneelers. There are two storeys and two bays. On the front is a porch and a doorway with a divided fanlight, and the windows are sashes with painted sills and lintels.
Kirby Balk; 54.28759°N 0.84370°W		Early 19th century	A house in limestone, with quoins, and a pantile roof with coped gables. There are two storeys, two bays, a single-storey outbuilding to the left, and a lean-to on the right. In the centre is a timber porch, and the windows are sash windows, those in the right bay are horizontally-sliding.
Loand House Farmhouse; 54.27285°N 0.83602°W		Early 19th century	The farmhouse is in limestone, with quoins, and a slate roof with coped gables. There are two storeys, three bays, and a lower two-storey one-bay wing on the left. The central doorway has a divided fanlight, and the windows in the main block are sashes. The wing contains casement windows.
Westfield Farmhouse; 54.27943°N 0.84068°W		Early 19th century	The farmhouse is in limestone, with quoins, and a pantile roof with coped gables and shaped kneelers. There are two storeys and three bays. On the front is a gabled porch, and the windows are sashes.
Whitehorn Farmhouse; 54.28952°N 0.82681°W		Early 19th century	The farmhouse is in sandstone on a plinth, with quoins, and a pantile roof with coped gables. There are two storeys, three bays, and a rear service wing. On the front is a doorway with a fanlight, the windows are sashes, and all the openings have painted lintels.
Cart shed, Whitehorn Farm; 54.28952°N 0.82599°W	—	Early 19th century	The cart shed is in sandstone, with quoins, and a pantile roof with coped gables. There is a single storey and three bays. On the front are three semicircular arches with voussoirs on chamfered piers, and in the right return is a shuttered pitching window.
Eastfield House Farmhouse; 54.27854°N 0.83851°W	—	19th century	The farmhouse incorporates part of an 18th-century house. The older part is in sandstone with quoins, the later part is in limestone, and the roof is in pantile with coped gables. There are two storeys, two bays, and a recessed single-bay wing on the left. The windows in the later part are sashes, and in the earlier part is a doorway and a horizontally-sliding sash window under a continuous painted lintel.
St Gregory's Church; 54.29369°N 0.83949°W		1854–55	The church is in limestone on a plinth, with a slate roof. It consists of a nave and a chancel with a polygonal apse in one unit, a south porch and a north vestry. On the west gable is a gabled bellcote containing two round-arched openings with moulded surrounds, a centre shaft with a scalloped capital, and a coved hood mould. The windows have round-arched heads, quoins, and coved hood moulds.
Guidestone; 54.32876°N 0.80792°W		1867	The guidestone in Cropton Forest is a monolith in sandstone, about 0.5 metres (1 ft 8 in) high. It is inscribed on the west face with "S", on the east face with "L", and on the south face with the date.
Hydrant, High Street; 54.29253°N 0.83810°W		1889	The hydrant is in cast iron, and consists of a fluted cylinder on an octagonal base, about 1.15 metres (3 ft 9 in) high. It has fluted domed cap with a rolled edge and a finial.
Hydrant, Village Green; 54.29100°N 0.84073°W		1889	The hydrant is in cast iron, and consists of a fluted cylinder on an octagonal base, about 1.15 metres (3 ft 9 in) high. It has a partly damaged fluted domed cap and a finial.
