= Aislaby Hall =

Building in Aislaby, North Yorkshire, England

Coordinates: 54°15′39″N 0°48′37″W

Aislaby Hall is a historic building in the village of Aislaby, near Pickering, North Yorkshire, in England.

The house was built in 1742 on behalf of Thomas Hayes. Its roof was rebuilt in the 19th century, and in 1896, a new service wing was added, incorporating part of an earlier house. In 1906, the wing was extended, and a garden porch was added. The house was Grade II* listed in 1953, along with its front wall and gate piers. Its gazebo and garden walls, contemporary with the house, are separately Grade II* listed.

The building is constructed of sandstone, with part of the service wing rendered. The main body of the building is two rooms deep, and it has a central stairhall. It is two storeys high, and the front is five bays wide. It has a central front door, with a Gothick fanlight and a doorcase with Doric order pilasters. The windows are sashes, and in the garden is a large lead water butt, dated 1714. The Georgian interior survives largely intact, including the cantilevered dogleg staircase, and assorted plasterwork and panelling.

The gazebo has three sides of brick and one of sandstone. It is one storey high, with a semi-basement, and is of a single bay. Its door, up a stone staircase, is partly panelled and partly glazed, and surrounded by a Doric doorcase. It has a pyramidal roof, with a finial, and a weathervane in the form of a dragon. Inside, there is an original chimneypiece with carved fretwork, shutters and window seats, and a ceiling painting.

== See also ==
- Listed buildings in Aislaby, Ryedale
