= Listed buildings in Aislaby, Ryedale =

Aislaby is a civil parish in the county of North Yorkshire, England. It contains eight listed buildings that are recorded in the National Heritage List for England. Of these, two are listed at Grade II*, the middle of the three grades, and the others are at Grade II, the lowest grade. The parish contains the village of Aislaby and the surrounding countryside, and the listed buildings consist of houses, cottages and associated structures, farmhouses and farm buildings, a former smithy and inn converted for other uses, and a watermill.

== Key ==
Grade	Criteria
II*	Particularly important buildings of more than special interest
II	Buildings of national importance and special interest

== Buildings ==
Name and location	Photograph	Date	Notes	Grade
Gazebo and walls, Aislaby Hall; 54.26077°N 0.80909°W	—	Early 18th century	The gazebo is in sandstone on the front, in brick in the other walls, and has chamfered quoins, a moulded eaves cornice, and a pyramidal stone slate roof with a wrought iron finial and dragon weathervane. There is a single storey and a semi-basement, a square plan, and a single bay. Steps lead up to a Doric doorcase with fluted pilaster jambs and a pediment. On the sides are sash windows with imposts, archivolts, and triple keystones. The garden walls attached to the gazebo are in red brick and sandstone, with piers and flat coping. In the west wall is a doorway with a rusticated Gibbs surround flanked by pilaster buttresses., and the south wall is banded with brick flues.	II*
The Blacksmith's Arms; 54.26084°N 0.80783°W		Early 18th century	Originally a smithy, with an inn added later in the 18th century, and subsequently converted for other uses. The building is in limestone, and has roofs of pantile and slate with coped gables and shaped kneelers. The former inn has two storeys and three bays, the lower former smithy to the left has two storeys and two bays, and further to the left is a single-storey outbuilding. On the front are three bow windows, and the other windows are horizontally-sliding sashes.	II
Aislaby Hall, wall and gate piers 54.26096°N 0.81025°W	—	Mid 18th century	The house is in sandstone on a plinth, with chamfered quoins, a floor band, an eaves band, a panelled parapet with moulded coping, and a blue pantile roof. There are two storeys, a double-depth plan, a front of five bays, and a recessed two-bay extension on the right. In the centre is a doorway with fluted Doric pilasters, a fanlight with Gothic glazing, and an open pediment. The windows are sashes in architraves. At the rear is a porch with a rusticated arch, a keystone and Doric pilasters, above which is a Venetian window. In front of the house is a wall containing a pair of gate piers, each with a cruciform plan, chamfered rusticated bands, a moulded cornice, and a pyramidal cap.	II*
Lane End Cottage; 54.26079°N 0.80755°W		Mid 18th century	The house is in limestone with a pantile roof. There are two storeys and three bays, and an outshut. The doorway is in the left bay, and the windows are small-pane casements.	II
High Costa Mill and cottage 54.24518°N 0.80873°W	—	18th century	The cottage is the older part, with the mill dated 1819. The cottage is cruck-framed, encased in limestone, and has a pantile roof. There are two storeys, four bays, the left bay projecting, and an outshut. The windows are horizontally-sliding sashes, and inside there is a full cruck truss. The mill is in sandstone with a pantile roof, coping gables and shaped kneelers. There are two storeys and an attic, and two wide bays. The mill contains a stable door with a tripartite lintel and a keystone with a shield inscribed with initials and the date, and to the right is a semicircular wheel-arch.	II
Wythe Syke Farmhouse and barn 54.24700°N 0.81484°W	—	Mid to late 18th century	The farmhouse and barn are in red brick on a sandstone plinth, with sandstone dressings, quoins, sill bands, dentilled eaves cornices, and pantile roofs with coped gables and shaped kneelers. The house has two storeys, three bays and a rear wing. The doorway has a fanlight, the windows are horizontally-sliding sashes, and all the openings have tripartite lintels and triple keystones. The barn to the left has a single storey and a loft, three bays divided by buttresses, and it contains square loft openings.	II
Manor Farmhouse; 54.26182°N 0.81275°W	—	Late 18th century	The farmhouse is in sandstone, with a sill band, a moulded eaves cornice, and a pantile roof with coped gables and shaped kneelers. There are two storeys, three bays and an outshut on the left. The central doorway has a fanlight, the windows are sashes, and all the openings have painted lintels with triple keystones.	II
Garden shelter southeast of Aislaby Hall; 54.26029°N 0.80962°W	—	19th century	The shelter is in sandstone, partly rendered, partly plastered, with a tile roof. The front is in open and in timber, with an entablature on fluted Roman Doric columns. Inside are two carved wooden figures, probably dating from the 17th century, formerly on a jettied structure.	II
