= Marton, Ryedale =

Village and civil parish in North Yorkshire, England

Coordinates: 54°14′22″N 0°52′32″W

Marton
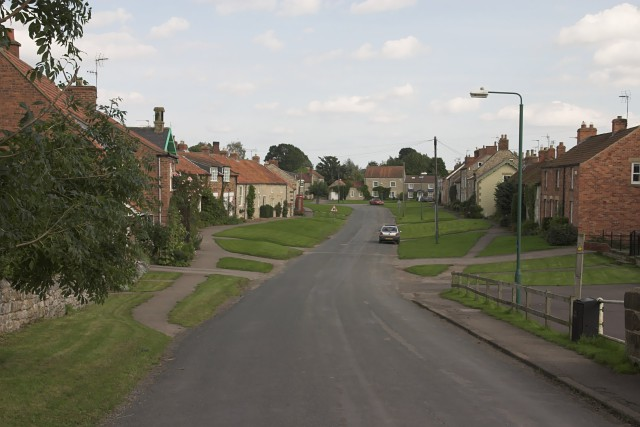
- Village street

- Location within North Yorkshire
- Population: 196 (2011)
- OS grid reference: SE734832
- Civil parish: Marton
- Unitary authority: North Yorkshire
- Ceremonial county: North Yorkshire
- Region: Yorkshire and the Humber
- Country: England
- Sovereign state: United Kingdom
- Post town: YORK
- Postcode district: YO62
- Police: North Yorkshire
- Fire: North Yorkshire
- Ambulance: Yorkshire
- UK Parliament: Thirsk and Malton

Marton is a village and civil parish in North Yorkshire, England. It is situated approximately 4.5 miles (7.2 km) west of the market town of Pickering on the River Seven.

Marton is a rare case in the Royal Mail address book that involves two dependent localities from the post town. The addresses in Marton follow the format "Marton, Sinnington, York". Sinnington is a village slightly north of Marton, which is itself dependent on the post town of York.

Religious services in the village are held in the Marton Mission Room.

The village was part of the Ryedale district between 1974 and 2023. It is now administered by North Yorkshire Council.

== See also ==
- Listed buildings in Marton, Ryedale
