= Marton Mission Room =

Chapel in Marton, North Yorkshire, England

Coordinates: 54°14′22″N 0°52′34″W

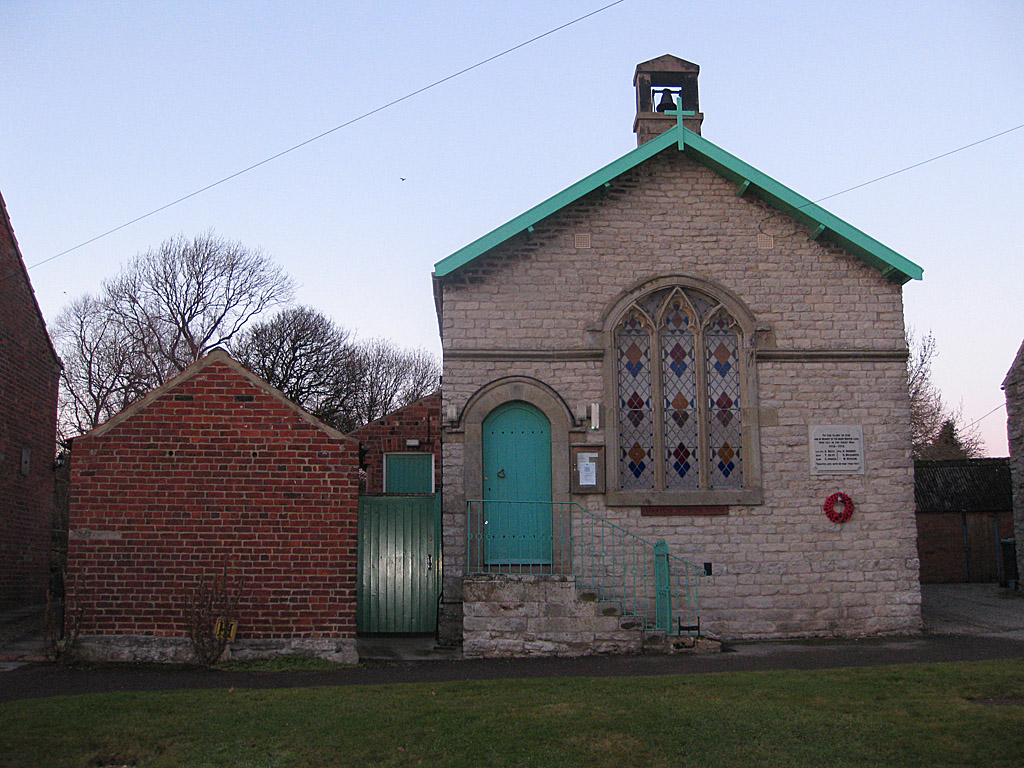
The building, in 2011

The Marton Mission Room is a chapel in Marton, a village near Kirkbymoorside, in North Yorkshire, England.

Until the mid-19th century, Marton did not have a place of worship, with Anglicans attending All Saints' Church, Sinnington. Methodism proved highly popular in the village, with a Primitive Methodist chapel being constructed in the 1810s and a new building replacing it in 1870.

In 1849, a school was built in Marton, and in 1853 it was licensed for Anglican worship. The school closed in 1969, and the room became a mission room. It became a grade II listed building on 6 October 1987 as "Church Hall". The mission room has since 1996 hosted non-denominational services, while the Methodist chapel closed in the 2010s. The mission room hosts a wide variety of community activities and was refurbished in 2023.

The church is built of limestone, with an extension in red brick and a slate roof, the gable end facing the street. Steps with railings lead up to a doorway with a plain surround, a pointed arch, and a moulded hood mould. To the right is a segmental-headed window with a moulded surround containing three cusped pointed lights with chamfered mullions, a moulded hood mould, and a moulded impost band. To its right is a war memorial panel. The gable has bargeboards, and is surmounted by a pedimented bellcote. In the right return are two square-headed three-light windows.

== See also ==
- Listed buildings in Marton, Ryedale
