= The Megalithic Portal =

The Megalithic Portal is a web resource dedicated to prehistoric archaeology and closely related subjects. The Megalithic Portal's mission is to document, publicise and protect ancient sites and help to ensure their preservation for future generations.

== History ==
Founded by chartered engineer Andy Burnham, the site database began in 1997 as Megalithic Mysteries, and the Prehistoric Web Index, from a database he originally compiled. The Megalithic Portal has existed in its current form since February 2001. The information is maintained by a team of voluntary editors and administrators and has become the centre of a keen user group. Contributors have been known to give up their jobs to travel, researching little-known ancient sites to add to the database. In 2002, Archaeology Magazine reviewed the Megalithic Portal, describing it as 'useful, fun, and accurate'. As of January 2010 the Megalithic Portal has been constituted as a non profit making membership society

The information contributed by thousands of visitors from all over the world covers types of prehistoric monument from chambered tombs and standing stones to hillforts and settlements, and much in between. There are many tens of thousands of listings, and over the years the site has extended beyond prehistoric megaliths, extending to, for example Pictish symbol stones in Scotland. While the site still calls itself the Megalithic Portal, it has also become the biggest online repository of data on related areas of interest such as holy wells and ancient crosses in the UK. Its listings are often referenced by noted web sites and in recent books on megaliths and Holy Wells.

A recent project (April 2010) has involved contributors finding over 1000 ancient sites pictured on Google Street View in the UK and elsewhere

== Features ==
Site features include:

- Comprehensive listing of prehistoric and related sites in the UK, Europe and worldwide searchable by name, type, location, grid reference, quality of remains and ease of access. Entries contain descriptions, on-page maps, comments and photographs from visitors, with links to local weather, accommodation, aerial views and further websites (over 20,000). Over 60 site types include stone and timber circles, rows, barrows and tombs of all sorts, surviving and destroyed
- The interactive Megalith Map covers the whole of Europe. Tens of thousands of sites are plotted, arranged as layers that can be turned on and off, zoomed and browsed according to site type and area. The map leads to live database entries containing, where possible, details of what remains today, what has been found in the past, and information on access, photographs, visitors' comments and a list of other nearby sites.
- The egallery contains over 50,000 photographs of ancient sites from around the UK and worldwide. Photographs are divided by location, with specialist galleries such as the Spirit of Place (best pictures of ancient sites) the Art Gallery (visitors’ drawings and paintings) and the History Gallery (places of interest outside the definition of prehistory).
- News stories from the world of prehistory, updated daily, with original articles and book reviews. The Megalithic Portal's news feeds are often referenced from other archaeological web sites.
- A Forum for the exchange of ideas and thoughts on stones, prehistory, sacred sites and mysteries
- A facility allowing visitors to submit their own articles and photographs.
- Downloads of data suitable for use with Google Earth, GeoRSS feeds, GPS and third-party mapping tools, links to download e-books, articles, audio and other resources.
