= Appleton-le-Moors =

Village and civil parish in North Yorkshire, England

Coordinates: 54°16′54″N 0°52′21″W

- Location within North Yorkshire
- Population: 164 (2011 census)
- OS grid reference: SE734880
- Civil parish: Appleton-le-Moors
- Unitary authority: North Yorkshire
- Ceremonial county: North Yorkshire
- Region: Yorkshire and the Humber
- Country: England
- Sovereign state: United Kingdom
- Post town: YORK
- Postcode district: YO62
- Police: North Yorkshire
- Fire: North Yorkshire
- Ambulance: Yorkshire
- UK Parliament: Thirsk and Malton

Appleton-le-Moors is a village and civil parish in North Yorkshire, England. According to the 2001 census it had a population of 183, reducing to 164 in the 2011 census. The village is in the North York Moors National Park, and is near to Pickering and Kirkbymoorside.

Historically part of the North Riding of Yorkshire, from 1974 to 2023 it was part of the district of Ryedale, it is now administered by the unitary North Yorkshire Council.

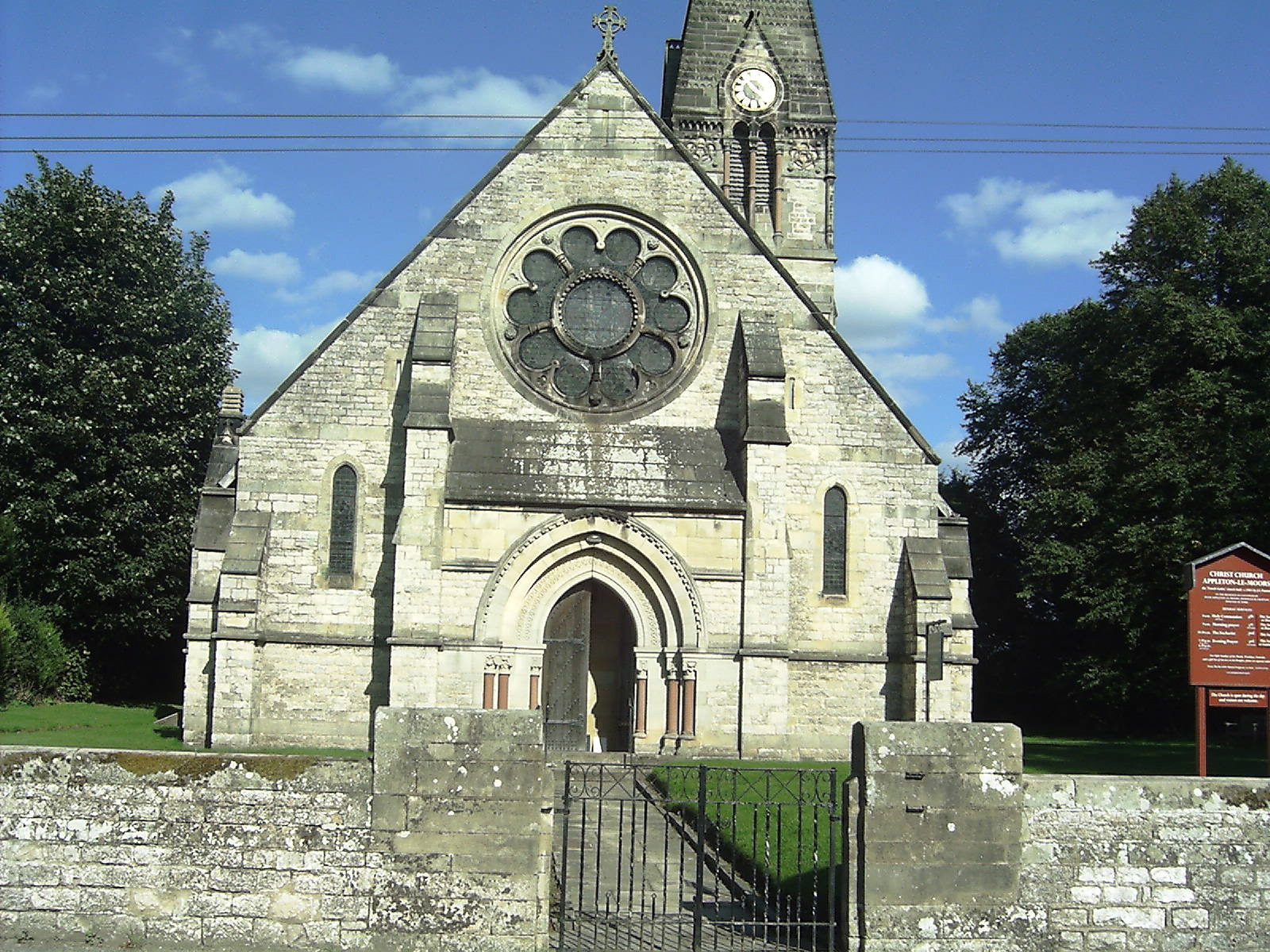
Christ Church, Appleton-le-Moors

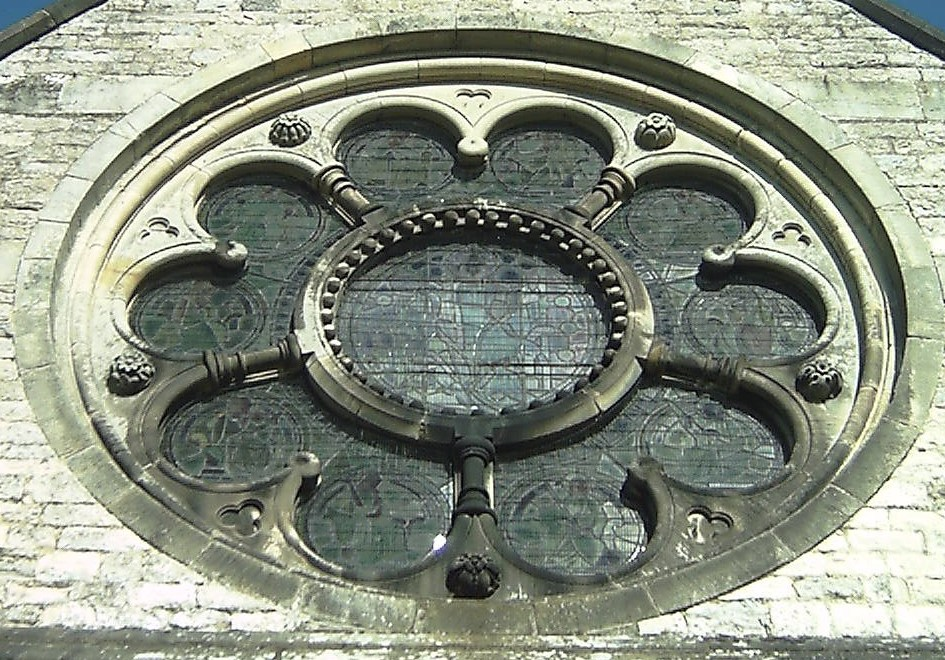
The rose window

The name Appleton derives from the Old English æppeltūn meaning 'apple orchard'.

This ancient village is recorded in the Domesday Book and retains its classic mediaeval layout. It is a site of archaeological interest, being a rich source of finds such as flint tools, Roman coins and a mediaeval oven. It is particularly noted for Christ Church, its exceptionally fine 19th century church which has earned the description "the little gem of moorland churches" and is Grade I listed. It was designed by the architect J.L. Pearson in French Gothic style with elaborate decoration, a tower surmounted with a spire, and a beautiful west-facing rose window of the 10-part (i.e. botanical) design similar to the White Rose of York, with stained-glass panels depicting Christian virtues such as Faith, Hope and Charity. The church and the village hall (formerly a school) were built by Mary Shepherd, widow of Joseph Shepherd (1804–62) who was born in Appleton-le-Moors, went to sea, and became a shipowner and a very rich man. Joseph and Mary are buried in Lastingham churchyard.

Joseph built a house in the village, opposite to where the church now stands. In the 1980s and 1990s the house was turned into a country hotel, but it has since returned to being a private residence. For a brief time in the 1840s Joseph employed a teacher to teach the village children but this ceased after his sister Ann Shepherd (who married her cousin Robert Shepherd) and her family, including 12 children, migrated to South Australia in 1843.

== See also ==
- Listed buildings in Appleton-le-Moors
