= Listed buildings in Rosedale West Side =

Rosedale West Side is a civil parish in the county of North Yorkshire, England. It contains seven listed buildings that are recorded in the National Heritage List for England. All the listed buildings are designated at Grade II, the lowest of the three grades, which is applied to "buildings of national importance and special interest". The parish is entirely rural, consisting of countryside and moorland, and it contains no settlements. The listed buildings consist of a farmhouse, a house and associated stables, and four standing stones acting as boundary stones or guidestones.

== Buildings ==
| Name and location | Photograph | Date | Notes |
|---|---|---|---|
| Margery Bradley; 54.40251°N 0.96142°W | | Medieval (probable) | A standing stone acting as a boundary stone and a waymarker, it is in sandstone, roughly hewn, and about 2 metres (6 ft 7 in) in height. The west face is inscribed "TD". |
| Boundary stone at NZ 67553 01140; 54.40128°N 0.96090°W | | 1714 | The boundary stone is roughly shaped, and is about 1.2 metres (3 ft 11 in) in height. The west face is inscribed "TD 1714". |
| Hall Farmhouse; 54.36935°N 0.92970°W | | 1716 | The farmhouse is in sandstone, with quoins, and a pantile roof with coped gables and shaped kneelers. There are two storeys, four bays, a lower three-bay extension recessed on the right, and a rear outshut. The doorway has a shallow arch, and a quoined and chamfered surround, and a dated and initialled lintel. The windows are sashes. In front of the extension is a pair of dog kennels. |
| Boundary stone at NZ 67706 00468; 54.39515°N 0.95838°W | — | Early 18th century | The boundary stone is roughly shaped, and is about 1.4 metres (4 ft 7 in) in height. The west face is inscribed "TD". |
| Guidestone; 54.38993°N 0.95625°W | | Early 18th century | The guidestone is roughly rectangular and is about 1.2 metres (3 ft 11 in) in height. The east side is inscribed "ROSEDALE RODE NORTH". |
| Woodlands; 54.36367°N 0.92440°W | — | Late 18th century | The house is in sandstone, and has a pantile roof with coped gables and shaped kneelers. There are two storeys and two bays, and a single-bay extension recessed on the left with a single storey and an attic. The doorway is in the extension, and the windows in both parts are horizontally sliding sashes. |
| Stable block, Woodlands; 54.36376°N 0.92426°W | — | Late 18th century | The stable block is in sandstone, and has a pantile roof with coped gables and shaped kneelers. There is one storey and a loft, and two bays. It contains paired stable doors, and a pitching door above. On the right return, a flight of stone steps leads up to a loft door. |
