= St Andrew's Church, Middleton =

Church in North Yorkshire, England

Coordinates: 54°15′32″N 0°48′03″W

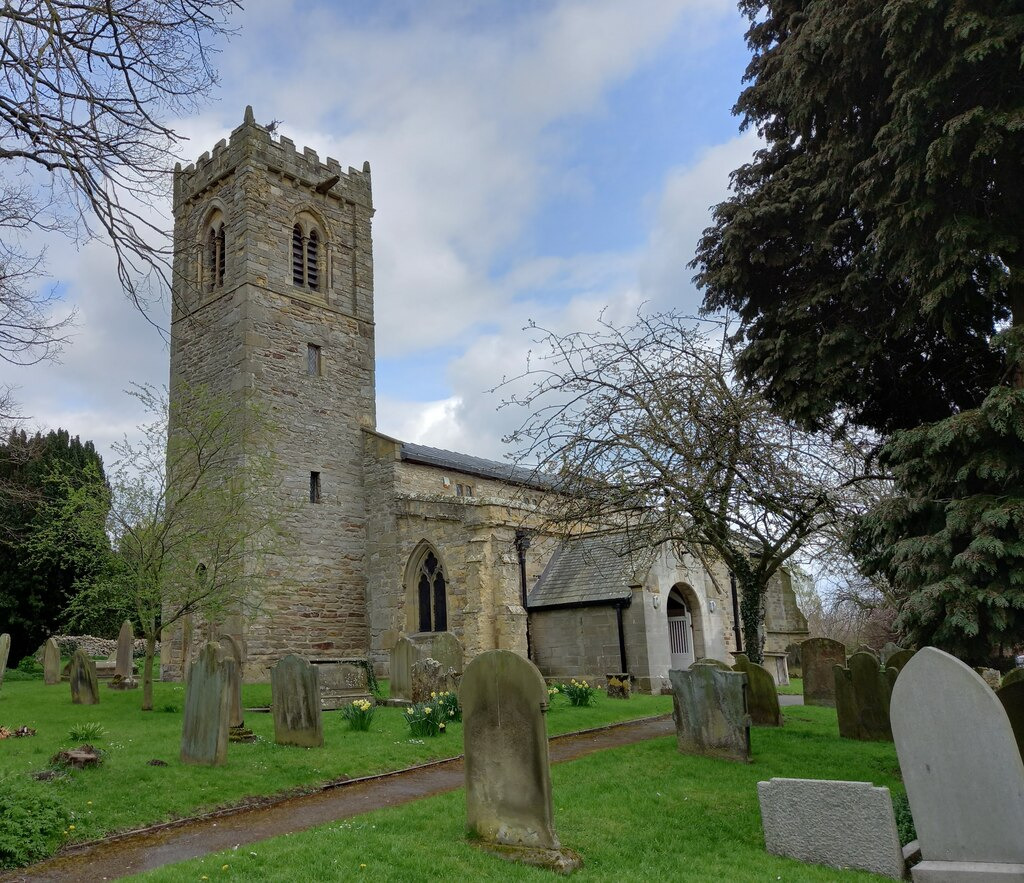
The church, in 2023

St Andrew's Church is the parish church of Middleton, a village near Pickering, North Yorkshire, in England.

The church was constructed in the 11th century, from which period the lower part of the tower survives. The north arcade was constructed in about 1130, followed later in the century by the south aisle. The tower and chancel arches were rebuilt in the 13th century and the top stage was added to the tower. In the 15th century, a clerestory was constructed, and the nave roof was rebuilt. The south porch was added in 1782, then in 1886 the nave was restored and the chancel largely rebuilt by C. Hodgson Fowler. Part of the church was reroofed in 1938. In 1953, the building was grade I listed.

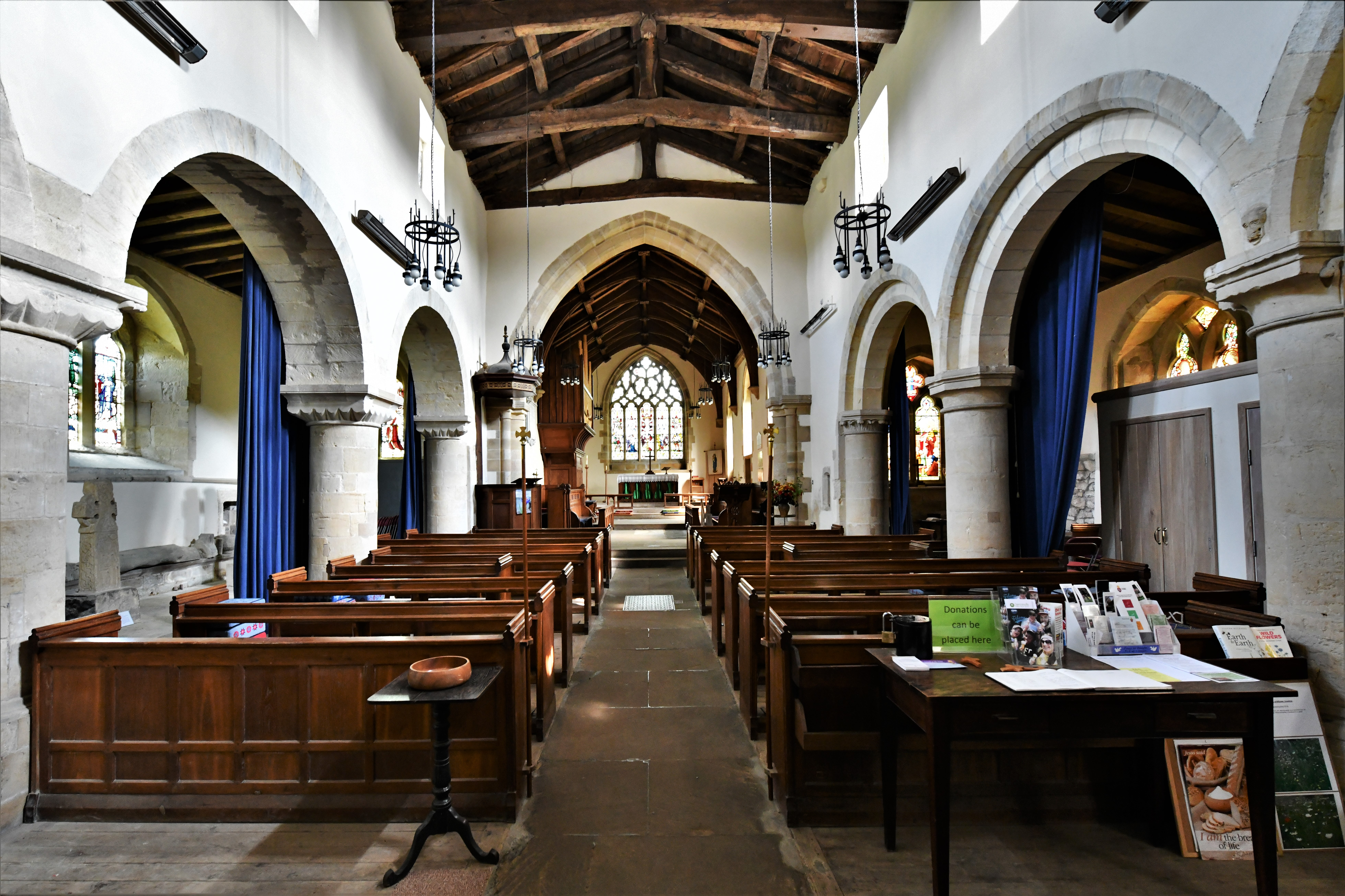
View from the nave into the chancel

The church is built of sandstone, the nave has a lead roof, the chancel has a slate roof, and the roof of the porch is in stone slate. The church consists of a nave with a clerestory, north and south aisles, a south porch, a chancel, and a west tower. In the west front of the tower is a blocked round-arched doorway with imposts, and the crown of the arch broken by vesica-shaped window. The bell openings are paired, in recessed pointed arches with shafts, and above is a corbel table and an embattled parapet. The porch is gabled and has a round-arched entrance, above which is a sundial. Inside the church is a font with a 16th century cover, 15th-century stalls, two with misericords, and an 18th-century pulpit. The nave roof has seven king post trusses.

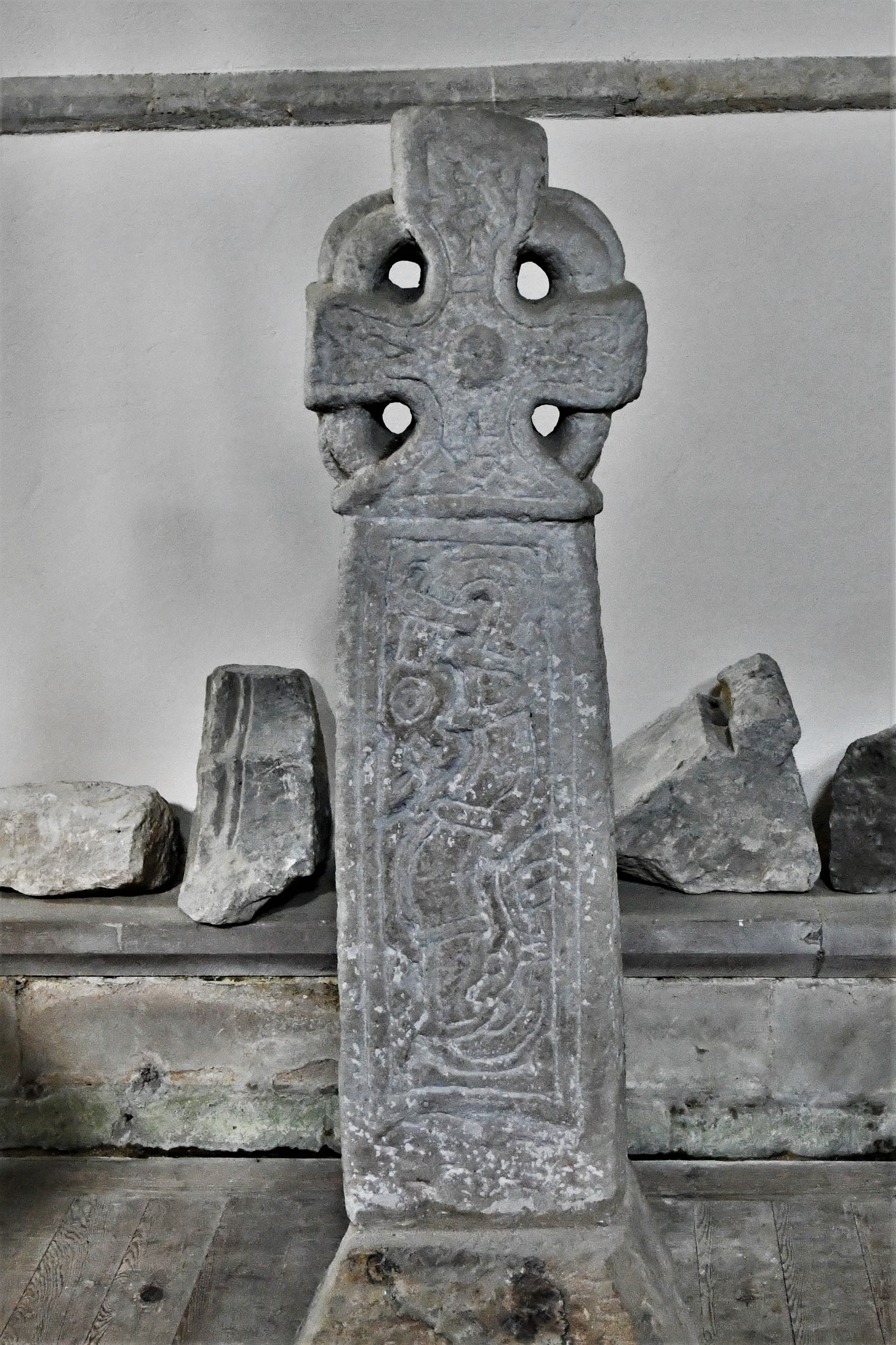
Saxon cross

The north aisle has a collection of 10th-century sculpture. This includes two crosses which were discovered built into the top stage of the tower, from which they were removed in 1911. The first is complete and is a monolith, with carvings including a hunt scene, a beast, and knotwork. The second is missing the base of its shaft and one cross-arm, with carvings including a human, a beast, and a variety of decoration. A third cross is also complete and monolithic.

== See also ==
- Grade I listed buildings in North Yorkshire (district)
- Listed buildings in Middleton, east North Yorkshire
