= Rosedale Chimney Bank =

Steep valley pass road in North Yorkshire, England

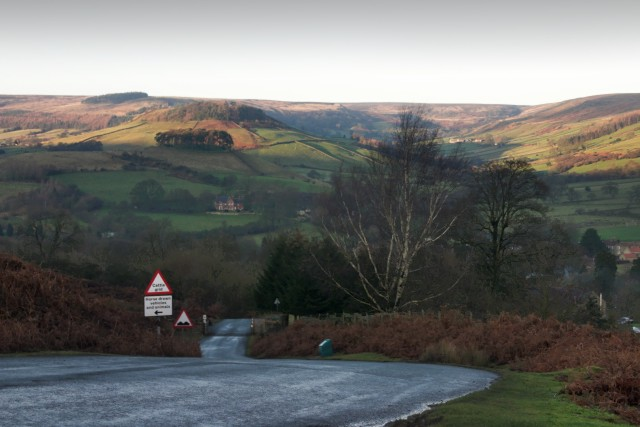
- Chimney Bank view looking north over Rosedale Abbey
- Interactive map of Rosedale Chimney Bank
- Elevation: 925 ft (282 m)
- Traversed by: Rosedale Abbey - Hutton-le-Hole road

Third Approach
- Location: North York Moors National Park, North Yorkshire
- Range: North York Moors
- Coordinates: 54.346043°N 0.890365°W

Rosedale Chimney Bank or just Chimney Bank is a hill pass that carries a minor road between Rosedale Abbey and Hutton-le-Hole in the North York Moors National Park, North Yorkshire, England. The tarmacked highway shares the title of steepest road in England (the other is Hardknott Pass in Cumbria).

The pass has an average gradient of 13%, with a maximum gradient of 1 in 3 (about 33%) and climbs 568 feet (173 m) on its 0.81-mile (1.3 km) route. It is colloquially known by cyclists as The Chain Breaker.

In 1987 it was used as the venue for the National Hill Climb Championship.

It takes its name from a 100-foot (30 m) high chimney which was built to support an ironstone mine which was in that area. The mine closed in 1929, but its chimney remained until it was demolished on 28 July 1972.
