= Middleton, Ryedale =

Village and civil parish in North Yorkshire, England

Coordinates: 54°15′27″N 0°48′00″W

Middleton
- Location within North Yorkshire
- Population: 348 (2011 Census)
- OS grid reference: SE782854
- Civil parish: Middleton
- Unitary authority: North Yorkshire
- Ceremonial county: North Yorkshire
- Region: Yorkshire and the Humber
- Country: England
- Sovereign state: United Kingdom
- Post town: PICKERING
- Postcode district: YO18
- Police: North Yorkshire
- Fire: North Yorkshire
- Ambulance: Yorkshire
- UK Parliament: Thirsk and Malton

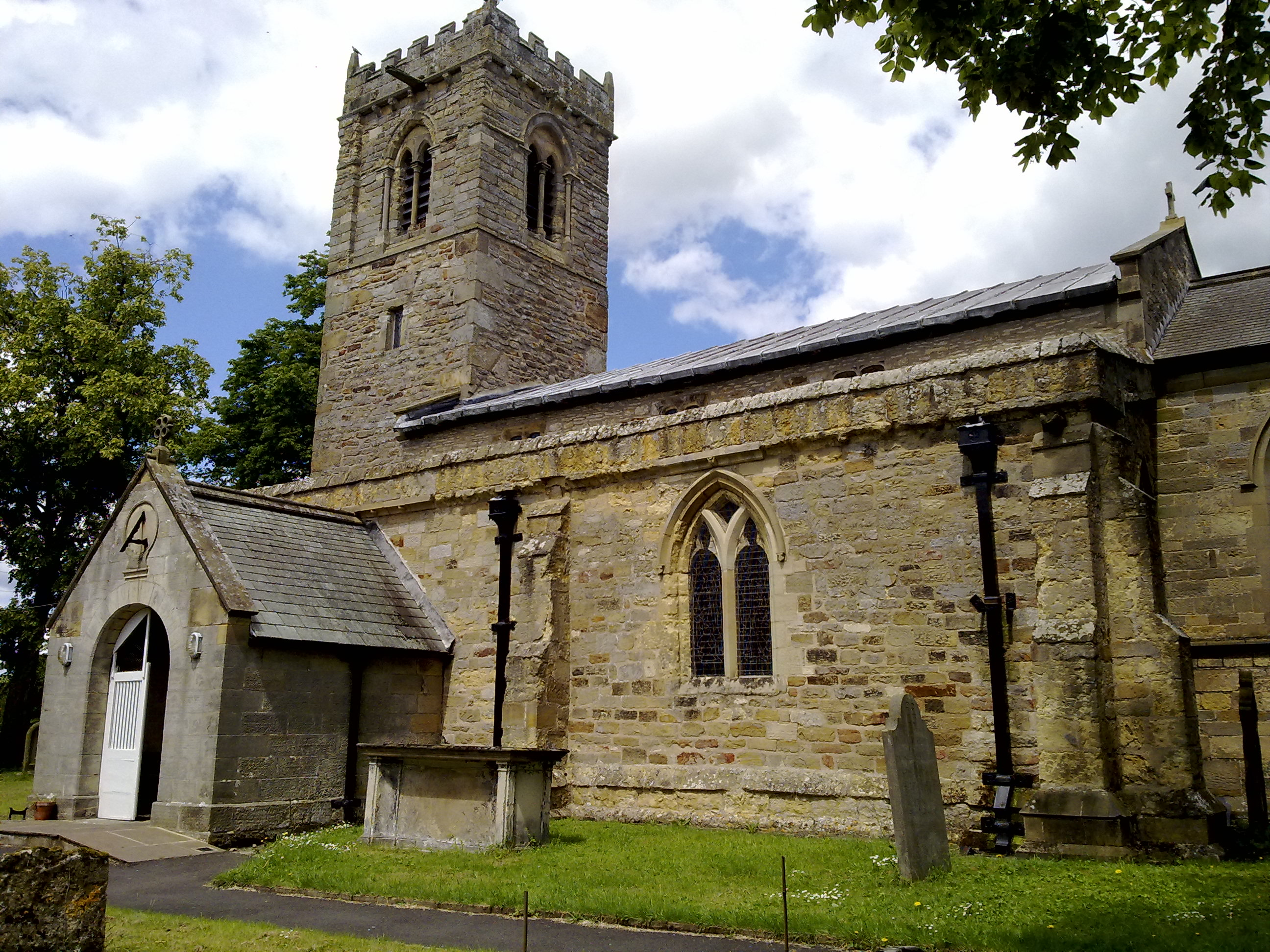
St Andrew's Church. Sundial can be seen on the porch entrance

Middleton is a small village and civil parish in North Yorkshire, England. It is situated on the A170 road to the west of Pickering.

St Andrew's Church, Middleton is Grade I listed. Above the entrance to the Church is a sundial that dates back to 1782.

Middleton Hall, next to the church, is a Grade II Listed house dating from the mid 18th century.

The village was part of the Ryedale district between 1974 and 2023. It is now administered by North Yorkshire Council.

== See also ==
- Listed buildings in Middleton, east North Yorkshire
