= Cropton =

Village and civil parish in North Yorkshire, England

Coordinates: 54°17′32″N 0°50′18″W

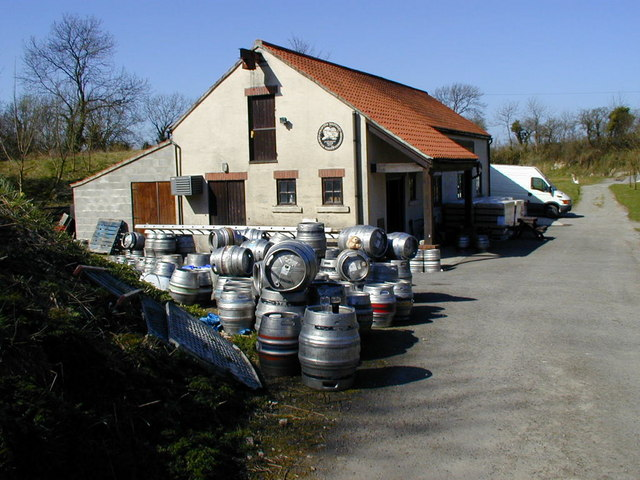
- Cropton Brewery in 2002

- Location within North Yorkshire
- Population: 321 (2011 Census)
- OS grid reference: SE757891
- Unitary authority: North Yorkshire
- Ceremonial county: North Yorkshire
- Region: Yorkshire and the Humber
- Country: England
- Sovereign state: United Kingdom
- Post town: PICKERING
- Postcode district: YO18
- Police: North Yorkshire
- Fire: North Yorkshire
- Ambulance: Yorkshire
- UK Parliament: Thirsk and Malton

Cropton is a village and civil parish in the county of North Yorkshire, England. It is on the border of the North York Moors National Park, 3 miles (5 km) north-west of Pickering.

== History ==
The village is mentioned in the Domesday Book of 1086 as having three ploughlands, but it does not list any inhabitants. The name of the village derives from Old English (cropp tūn), which means a swelling, mound or hill with a farmstead, settlement or village. At the 2001 census, the parish (including Aislaby) had a population of 354, decreasing to 321 (including Stape) at the 2011 Census.

Just outside the village and to the north, is the site of a set of Roman practice marching camps at Cawthorne, excavated by universities in recent years. The camps are thought to be there as the village was on the route of a Roman Road between York and Dunsley Bay (Sandsend), on the Yorkshire Coast near to Whitby. These have been registered as ancient monuments. The site of a former motte-and-bailey castle, known as the Round Hill, is now a scheduled ancient monument.

== Facilities and services ==
The Great Yorkshire Brewery, a microbrewery, is located to the rear of the New Inn on the edge of the village. The owners of the pub started brewing their own beer in 1984, although beer had been brewed in the village as far back as 1613.

To the north of the village lies Cropton Forest, a 9,050-acre (3,660 ha) woodland that has a caravan park within it. The forest is also noted for a programme to reintroduce beavers, which was successful in producing kits (baby beavers) in 2021.

St Gregory's Church, Cropton is a grade II listed structure, and whilst there is no accurate record of its building date, it was rebuilt in 1844. In the churchyard is the base of a medieval cross. There is a poem and tradition associated with taking a drink and leaving money at the cross.

Peat Rigg Outdoor Centre is also located near Cropton.

== Governance ==
An electoral ward in the same name exists. This ward stretches south to Normanby, with a total population taken at the 2011 Census of 1,542.

From 1974 to 2023 it was part of the district of Ryedale. It is now administered by the unitary North Yorkshire Council.

== Notable people ==
- William Scoresby, Arctic whaler and navigator who sailed out of Whitby

== See also ==
- Listed buildings in Cropton
