= Rosedale Abbey =

Village in North Yorkshire, England

Coordinates: 54°21′15″N 0°53′15″W

- Main square in Rosedale Abbey

- Location within North Yorkshire
- OS grid reference: SE726955
  - London: 200 mi (320 km) S
- Unitary authority: North Yorkshire
- Ceremonial county: North Yorkshire
- Region: Yorkshire and the Humber
- Country: England
- Sovereign state: United Kingdom
- Post town: PICKERING
- Postcode district: YO18
- Dialling code: 01751
- Police: North Yorkshire
- Fire: North Yorkshire
- Ambulance: Yorkshire
- UK Parliament: Thirsk and Malton

Rosedale Abbey is a village in North Yorkshire, England. It is approximately 8 miles (13 km) north-west of Pickering, 8 miles south-east of Castleton and within Rosedale, part of the North York Moors National Park, taking its name from the priory of nuns which existed there before the Reformation.

From 1974 to 2023 it was part of the district of Ryedale. It is now administered by the unitary North Yorkshire Council.

== History ==
A priory for Cistercian nuns and a monastic grange both existed in Rosedale before the Reformation.

=== Rosedale Priory ===
The priory was established by 1158 for nuns of the Cistercian order. (Note: The priory was established with endowments from William of Rosedale, before 1158, (Note: Parishes: Middleton ( William Page ). . . .No mention of ROSEDALE. . .is found in the Domesday Book. It must, however, have been in the king's hands together with Middleton and Cropton, for these places afterwards formed part of the honour of Rosedale. The first lord of this fee was Turgis Brundos, lord of Liddell, who is styled Turgis de Rosedale in a charter of about 1125. He died before 1130–1 and was succeeded by William his son, founder of Rosedale Priory for nuns of the Cistercian order . . .) and Robert de Stuteville (c.1190). (Note: ROSEDALE, EAST-SIDE ( Thomas Langdale ). . . .This church (Note: The Parish Church of St Mary and St Lawrence, Rosedale Abbey.) is part of the ruins of a priory founded in the time of Richard I 1190, for Benedictines or Cistercians, by Robert de Stuteville, and dedicated to St. Lawrence and St. Mary . . .)) (Note: See also Keldholme Priory > . . .It was established by one of the Robert de Stutvilles in either the reign of Henry I of England or Henry II of England.) It was one of twenty four nunneries in Yorkshire. (Note: As of 1999 only four of the twenty four nunneries were still in use: (Note: At least part of the remaining structure was in use as a church or for another purpose.): Marrick Priory; Nun Monkton (Note: See Nun Monkton > Benedictine nunnery); Swine Priory; Wilberfoss Priory; See also List of monastic houses in North Yorkshire)

Sheep farming was the main source of the priory's income. (Note: Chapter 10 THE HOLY WOMEN ( Bernard Jennings ). . . .sheep farming was just as important to some of the nunneries. . .as it was to Cistercian abbeys such as Fountains and Rievaulx. . .At the top of the list is Keldholme with 12 sacks, followed by Arden, Rosedale and Ellerton-in-swaledale with 10 sacks. . .) Little is known of the priory. Unlike their male counterparts in nearby Fountains Abbey and Rievaulx Abbey, the nuns were probably not fluent writers. Furthermore, the Cistercians were famed for their hostility to women, leaving nuns wishing to follow the Cistercian life in an awkward, unofficial position only partially connected to the rest of the Order. Moreover, a house for nuns could not be founded, as a party of monks could be sent out from an existing Cistercian abbey to trace its filiation all the way to the mother-house at Cîteaux Abbey in France.

Thus we do not know what the Priory looked like (in contrast to Cistercian abbeys which are highly formulaic). What stone remains is well finished and laid, but it is unclear where in the church it would have been and what ancillary buildings might have surrounded that church. Indeed, this whole chapter of the valley's history is little understood, with only a handful of references remaining. There are records suggesting that the nuns at one point had to be moved following a raid by Scots. Another record reprimands the nuns for financial mismanagement and urges them not to give away so much in aid to the poor that they bankrupt themselves. Another reprimand tells them not to allow visitors into their dormitory, and another warns them against allowing puppies into the church lest they disturb the service. (Note: Chapter 10 THE HOLY WOMEN ( Bernard Jennings ). . . .In the 14th century Archbishop Greenfield told the nuns of Keldholme and Rosedale to stop taking their puppies into church. . .) It seems from these records that there was probably a steady population of between six and twelve nuns.

The priory closed in 1536 as a result of Henry VIII's dissolution of the monasteries. (Note: ROSEDALE, EAST-SIDE ( Thomas Langdale ). . .The site was granted 30th Henry VIII to Ralph Nevile, Earl of Westmorland. . .About the time of the dissolution, a prioress and 8 or 9 religious belonged to this house. . .Of the ruins that remain is the square of the cloister, which is almost entire; the buildings having been converted into dwelling houses. . .In this square, are some of the tomb stones that have been placed over the nuns, with crosses, &c. carved on them. . .) The buildings were left to decay, and what remained was eventually dismantled in the 19th century. (Note: Parishes: Middleton (William Page). . .West Gill and North Gill rise over 1,300 ft. above the ordnance datum, unite to form Northdale Beck, and join the River Seven at Rosedale Abbey; within the triangle thus formed lie the conventual ruins, now converted into barns and cottages, the abbey church, rebuilt in 1894, and the mill in the grounds. . .The capital messuage, priory or mansion-house, known as the manor-house of Rosedale had in 1649 " several lower and upper rooms very ancient and decayed " . . .) The stone was reused all around the village, including for a new church close to the priory church; but there are also suspiciously well-carved lintels built into garden walls, and sheds with well-cut ashlar stone. Many of the buildings now in the village have distinctly Gothic windows, and two of the churches at least have circular windows (a common feature of Cistercian churches, which were all dedicated to the Virgin Mary, of whom circular windows were a sign). It is unlikely that many (if any) of these stylistic details are remnants of the priory. They speak more of the Victorian sensibilities prevalent at the time that the population of the village soared, but may well have mimicked traditions set out by the priory.

Church of St Mary and St Lawrence

The Parish Church of St Mary and St Lawrence was built c. 1894 on the foundations of the priory chapel. (Note: Chapter 10 THE HOLY WOMEN ( Bernard Jennings ) . . .Present church (Note: The Parish Church of St Mary and St Lawrence, Rosedale Abbey.) built c.1839 on site of chancel of priory church. . .)

All that remains of the original building structure is a stair turret, (Note: PRIORY REMAINS (Historic England). List Entry Summary: Heritage Category: Listed building; Grade: II; County: North Yorkshire; District: Ryedale (District Authority); Parish: Rosedale East Side; National Grid Reference: SE 72373 95927) a sundial and a single stone pillar. Some headstones that seem to belong to nuns have been reported, though it is unclear whether they are in situ. Founded in 1158 or earlier, the priory was inhabited by a small group of nuns credited with being the first people to farm sheep commercially in the region – a quintessentially Cistercian practice driven by the order's desire to live "far from the concourse of men".

There is also evidence that the local water-courses have been carefully managed: another common feature of Cistercian landscapes.

=== Mining ===
In the 19th century an iron ore mining industry was established. The population of the valley expanded rapidly until the demise of the mines in the 1920s.

== Modern village life ==
Holiday cottages in Rosedale Abbey

Rosedale Abbey now consists of a collection of stone houses and public houses, St Mary and St Laurence's Church, an art gallery, a tea room, a sandwich shop, a glass studio, a cheesemaker and a village green.

Tourism in the area has developed into a major industry, with many smaller properties renovated for private holiday homes or as self-catering accommodation. Hotels, larger properties and farms provide bed and breakfast accommodation.

Recently a parish council election attracted candidates opposed to the construction of affordable housing close to their properties.

A farm near the village

Rosedale Show is held in the village each August and attracts some 5,000 visitors. The show dates back to 1871 and is one of the oldest agricultural shows in North Yorkshire.

The notoriously steep hill pass road known as Chimney Bank connects the village with Hutton-le-Hole, though the chimney that gave it its name was demolished in 1972.

Rosedale has both a football and a cricket team. The football team competes in the Ryedale Beckett League Division 1 and the cricket team competes in the Feversham League.

== See also ==
- North York Moors
- List of monastic houses in North Yorkshire
- North Yorkshire
- North Yorkshire Council
