= Horsbere Brook =

Tributary of the River Severn

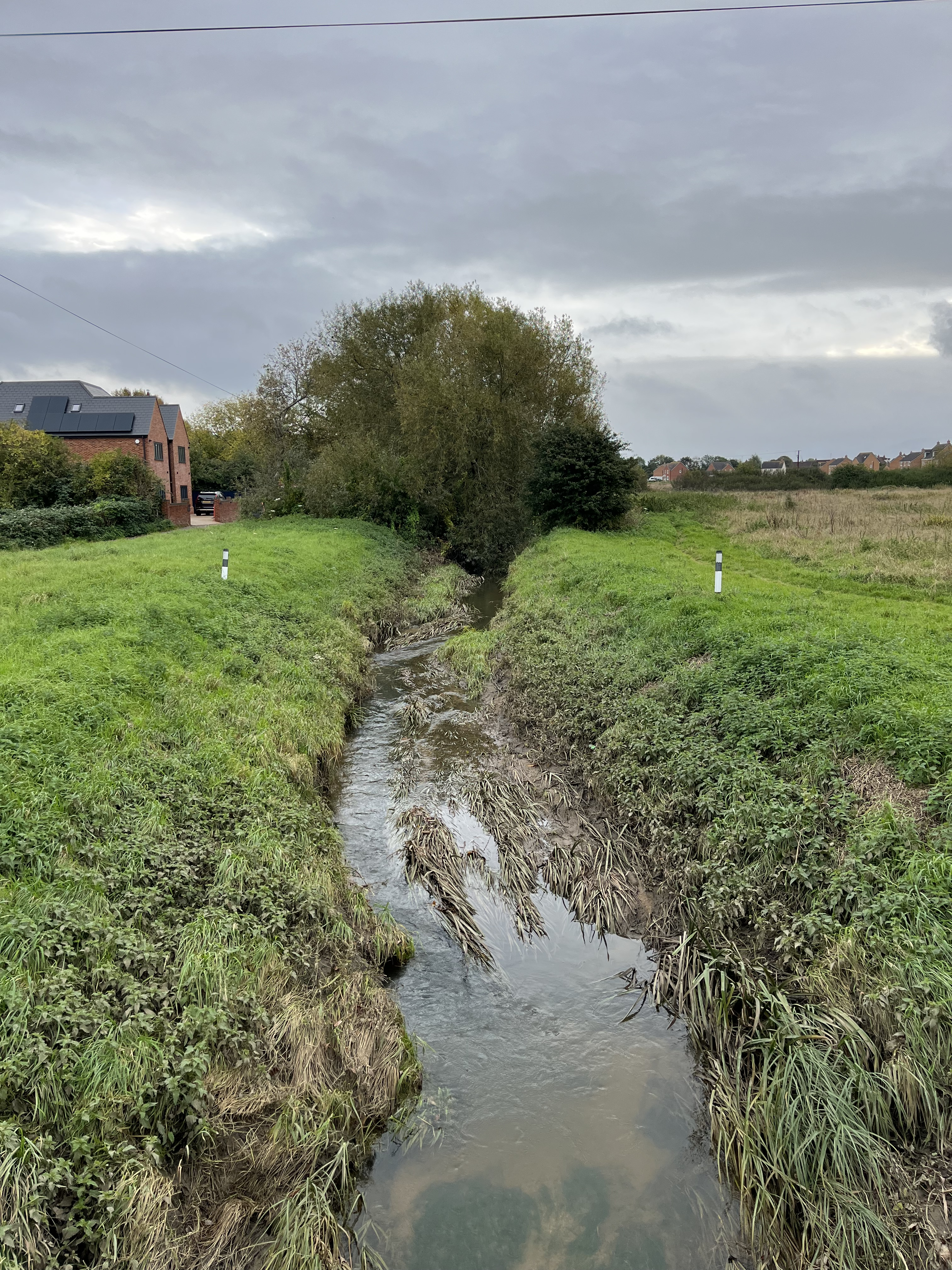
- Horsbere Brook at Longford

Location
- Country: England
- County: Gloucestershire
- Settlements: Longford, Innsworth, Hucclecote, Brockworth, Great Witcombe

Physical characteristics
- Source
  - location: Great Witcombe
- Mouth
  - location: River Severn, Longford
  - coordinates: 51.8859323°N 2.2512863°W

Horsbere Brook is a tributary of the River Severn. It begins at Great Witcombe and flows in a northwesterly direction towards Longford, Gloucestershire, it's mouth being the Severn.

Part of the brook forms a section of the boundary between the villages of Longford and Longlevens. Horsbere is culverted as it passes under the A40, A38, A417, and A46 roads.

== Course ==
Course of Horsbere Brook

Starting in Great Witcombe, the Brook takes an almost straight northwesterly-flowing direction, passing through the centre of Brockworth before entering Gloucester. As Horsbere Brook moves northwest, it begins to interact more with human settlements and infrastructure. It flows through the areas of Hucclecote and Barnwood, where its banks are sometimes reinforced to accommodate urban development. At this stage, the brook passes through the Horsbere Brook Flood Storage Area.

Continuing its journey westward, Horsbere Brook enters Longlevens, a suburban area of Gloucester. Here, the brook meanders gently through open spaces, parks, and residential neighborhoods, with several footbridges and pathways providing public access. Horsbere Brook eventually flows into the River Severn East Channel. In this low-lying area, the brook widens slightly and slows down, carrying sediment and nutrients toward its final destination. The exact point where Horsbere Brook enters the Severn depends on water levels and any small-scale modifications to the local hydrology.

== Flood Alleviation Scheme ==
In response to significant flooding in 2007, the Environment Agency constructed the Horsbere Brook Flood Alleviation Scheme, completed in 2011. This project involved excavating 120,000 cubic meters of earth to create a large flood storage area adjacent to the A417 Barnwood Link Road.

The scheme is designed to protect over 350 homes in Elmbridge and Longlevens from flooding events with a 1 in 100 chance of occurring in any given year. When the flow in Horsbere Brook increases, excess water flows into the storage area and is gradually released back into the Brook when the river flow decreases. The site has a total storage capacity of 170,000 cubic meters.

== See also ==
- Hatherley Brook
- River Severn
