= Up Hatherley =

Suburb of Cheltenham, Gloucestershire, England

Coordinates: 51.8853°N 2.1245°W

- Location within Gloucestershire
- Population: 6,072 (2011)
- OS grid reference: SO914204
- Civil parish: Up Hatherley
- Shire county: Gloucestershire
- Region: South West
- Country: England
- Sovereign state: United Kingdom
- Post town: CHELTENHAM
- Postcode district: GL51
- Dialling code: 01242
- Police: Gloucestershire
- Fire: Gloucestershire
- Ambulance: South Western
- UK Parliament: Cheltenham

Up Hatherley is a civil parish and a suburb of the spa town of Cheltenham, Gloucestershire, England. Formerly a hamlet in the parish of Shurdington, it became a parish in 1887 and became a part of Cheltenham in 1991.

== History ==
The village was recorded (combined with Down Hatherley) as Hegberleo in 1022. It was listed as Athelai in the Domesday Book of 1086. In 1273 it was known as Dunheytherleye and in 1221, Hupheberleg. The name derived from the Old English hagu-thorn + lēah meaning "hawthorn clearing". the distinguishing affixes "Up" and "Down" derived from the Old English upp meaning "higher upstream" and dūne meaning "lower downstream". Down Hatherley is a separate parish three miles (5 km) downstream on the Hatherley Brook.

The parish of Up Hatherley was formed from a small settlement of scattered farms in 1887 and remained little changed until 1945. Prior to that it had been considered a hamlet in the parish of Shurdington. Along with Swindon Village, Leckhampton and Prestbury, the parish was added to the borough of Cheltenham in 1991. Part of the parish was transferred to the parish of Shurdington.

== Governance ==
Up Hatherley, with a small part of the parish of Leckhampton, forms the ward of Up Hatherley, represented by two councillors on Cheltenham Borough Council. It is part of the Cheltenham constituency and is represented in parliament by Liberal Democrat MP Max Wilkinson.

== Church ==
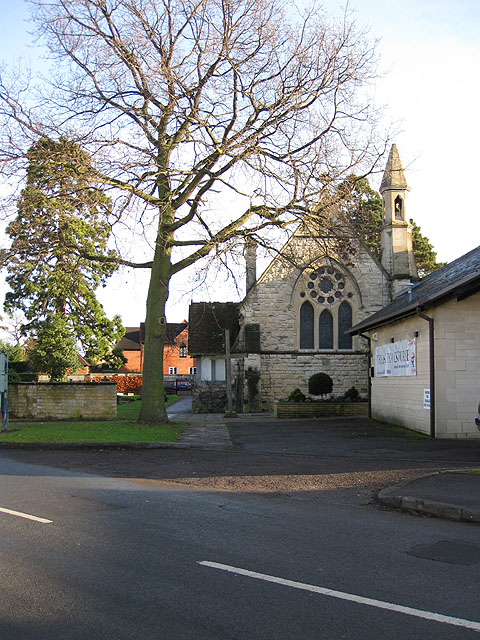
Up Hatherley church of Saint Philip and Saint James

There was a church at Up Hatherley from at least 1022. The original church was destroyed in a fire in about 1640 and Up Hatherley parishioners had to use the north aisle of the church of the nearby village of Shurdington. The church of St. Philip and St. James was built between 1885 and 1886. It cost £2,000 and was paid for by Rev. W. H. Gretton and Mrs Gretton. The late Rev. Gretton had donated the land and his widow had intended to have a chapel built since her failing health made it difficult for her to travel as far as Badgeworth to attend church. When residents asked her if they could attend the proposed chapel, she decided to have a village church built. The new church, seating approximately 150 parishioners, was consecrated in 1886 by the Lord Bishop of Gloucester. The first vicar of the new parish was Rev. E. L. Jennings.

== Notable residents ==
- Brian Jones (1942–1969), musician and a founding member of The Rolling Stones
- Eric Dier (1994), Tottenham Hotspur Defender
- Mike Summerbee (1942), Manchester City Winger
- Leon Taylor (1977), Olympic Diver
- Michael "Eddie the Eagle" Edwards (1963), Olympic Ski Jumper
- Zac Purchase (1986), Olympic Rower
- Edward Adrian Wilson (1872-1912), formed part of Captain Scott's Antarctic Expedition as Chief of the Scientific Staff
- Sir Arthur "Bomber" Harris, 1st Baronet (1892–1984), Marshal of the Royal Air Force, AOC-in-C RAF Bomber Command
