= Gloucester & Cheltenham Stadium =

Gloucestershire greyhound racing

Gloucester and Cheltenham Stadium
- Location: Longlevens, north-east Gloucester
- Coordinates: 51°52′40″N 2°12′19″W
- Opened: 1933
- Closed: 1983

The Gloucester and Cheltenham Stadium was a greyhound racing stadium situated in Longlevens, some 7 miles from Cheltenham and 3 miles from Gloucester, England.

== History ==
=== Origins ===
The site chosen for the construction of the stadium was on the north side of the Cheltenham Road near the Elm Bridge and on the opposite side of the road to the newly built football ground used by Gloucester City A.F.C.

=== Opening ===
The stadium opened several years after an unsuccessful attempt to start racing at nearby Elmbridge. It had looked unlikely that racing would start at Longlevens because in January 1933 plans had been refused by the council due to concerns over noise and disruption. The opening night was on Saturday 22 July 1933 and the track dimensions consisted of a 432-yard circumference with distances of 500 and 650 yards. There were kennel facilities for 200 greyhounds within the stadium grounds.

On the first night, gates opened at 6.30pm with racing starting at 7.30pm, seven races were organised and the first greyhound to pass the winning line was Valiant Rufus who beat Uskside Winner by a short head in 29.87sec. Valiant Rufus trained by Leslie Carpenter went on to win the Welsh Greyhound Derby the following year.

=== Pre World War II history ===
Bully Ring trained by Robert Linney won the Welsh Derby for the track again in July 1936. Black Peter trained by Stan Raymond made it to the 1939 English Greyhound Derby final. Unfortunately he was withdrawn from the final following an injury sustained during training, this was the only time Gloucester would ever have a finalist in this event.

=== 1944 scandal ===
The stadium was rocked by a scandal in 1944 when six men were charged with conspiracy to administer drugs to a greyhound and they were put on trial, four were found guilty and two were acquitted.

=== Post War history ===
Trainers Ronnie Mills, Arthur Shelton and Stan Raymond dominated racing in the west region and in 1947 the tote turnover reached £748,859, providing a sizeable profit for Gloucester and Cheltenham Greyhounds Ltd.

Gloucester won the 1956 News of the World Intertrack Cup Final and in 1960 Leicester Racing Manager Harold Richards took control. In the 1960s the resident trainers were Ron Mills, Leslie Carpenter, Ian Ray and John Wheeler.

Plans to move to a modern stadium began to surface but did not come to fruition because a new greyhound track opened nearby in Gloucester around the Horton Road Stadium in 1975. Despite the competition the track managed to outstay their neighbours and Horton Road closed to greyhounds in 1979.

New track metric measurements resulted in distances of 462, 647 & 860 metres and the Thursday and Saturday night racing schedule continued until 1983, the year in which the track celebrated a fifty-year anniversary.

=== Closure ===
After failing to secure new premises at Oxleaze and Churchdown, the decision was made by the company to make 22 October 1983 the last race meeting. A statement by the Chairman W V Eggleton cited increased costs but soon after Westbury Estates revealed that they had gained permission for a redevelopment programme including the stadium.

The Greyhound Inn which was built in 1985 and the Greyhound Gardens road mark the site today.

== Track records ==
Distance	Greyhound	Time	Date
500y	Spring Shower	28.01	07.10.1948
500y	Square Gift	27.79	23.04.1962
650y	Bundle of Fun	37.25	08.07.1948
700y	Old Berry Jewel	39.75	27.09.1962
500yH	Joy's Heartbreak	29.24	24.07.1948
500yH	Halfpenny King	28.72	22.07.1965
860m	Doverdale Lady	54.79	1976
