= List of churches in Cheltenham =

The following is a list of churches in Cheltenham, Gloucestershire.

== List ==
- All Saints' Church, Cheltenham
- Cheltenham Minster, St Mary's
- Christ Church, Cheltenham
- Mosaic Church Cheltenham
- St Gregory's Church, Cheltenham
- St Peter's Church, Leckhampton
- St Philip and St James Church, Leckhampton
- St Philip and St James Church, Up Hatherley
- Trinity Cheltenham

== See also ==
- List of churches in Gloucestershire
