= Hatherley Brook =

Tributary of the River Severn

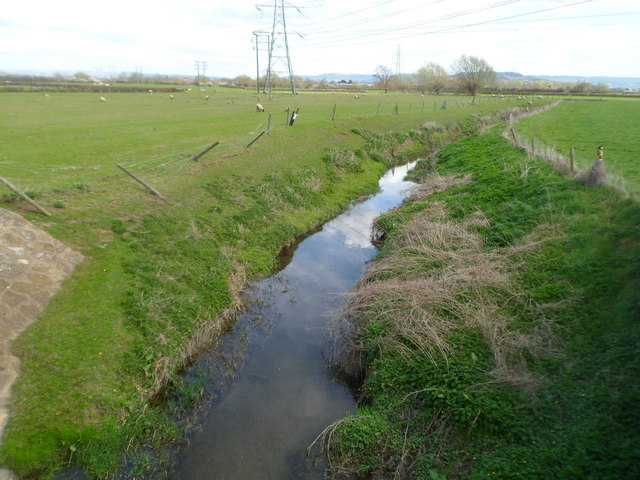
- Hatherley Brook at Twigworth

Location
- Country: England
- County: Gloucestershire
- Settlements: Cheltenham, Staverton, Down Hatherley, Innsworth, Longford

Physical characteristics
- Source
  - location: Up Hatherley
- Mouth
  - location: River Severn, Longford
  - coordinates: 51.8870056°N 2.2543457°W

Hatherley Brook is a tributary of the River Severn. It begins at Up Hatherley and flows in a westerly direction towards Longford, its mouth being the Severn.

Part of the brook forms a section of the boundary between the villages of Longford and Sandhurst, Innsworth and Twigworth, and Innsworth and Down Hatherley. Hatherley is culverted as it passes under the A38, A40, and M5 roads.

== Course ==
Course of Hatherley Brook

Starting in an urban environment in Up Hatherley, Cheltenham, the brook takes an almost northwesterly-flowing direction, passing near GCHQ and heading towards Staverton. At this point, it begins to flow west and enters into a more rural area.

Continuing its journey westward, Hatherley Brook enters the villages of Down Hatherley, Innsworth, and Longford, before reaching its mouth on the River Severn East Channel.

== Flooding ==
The Environment Agency monitors Hatherley Brook to manage flood risks effectively. For example, at the Sandhurst station, water levels are closely observed to provide timely flood warnings to the local community.

== See also ==
- Horsbere Brook
- River Severn
