= Longlevens =

Suburb of Gloucester, England

Coordinates: 51.87787°N 2.21701°W

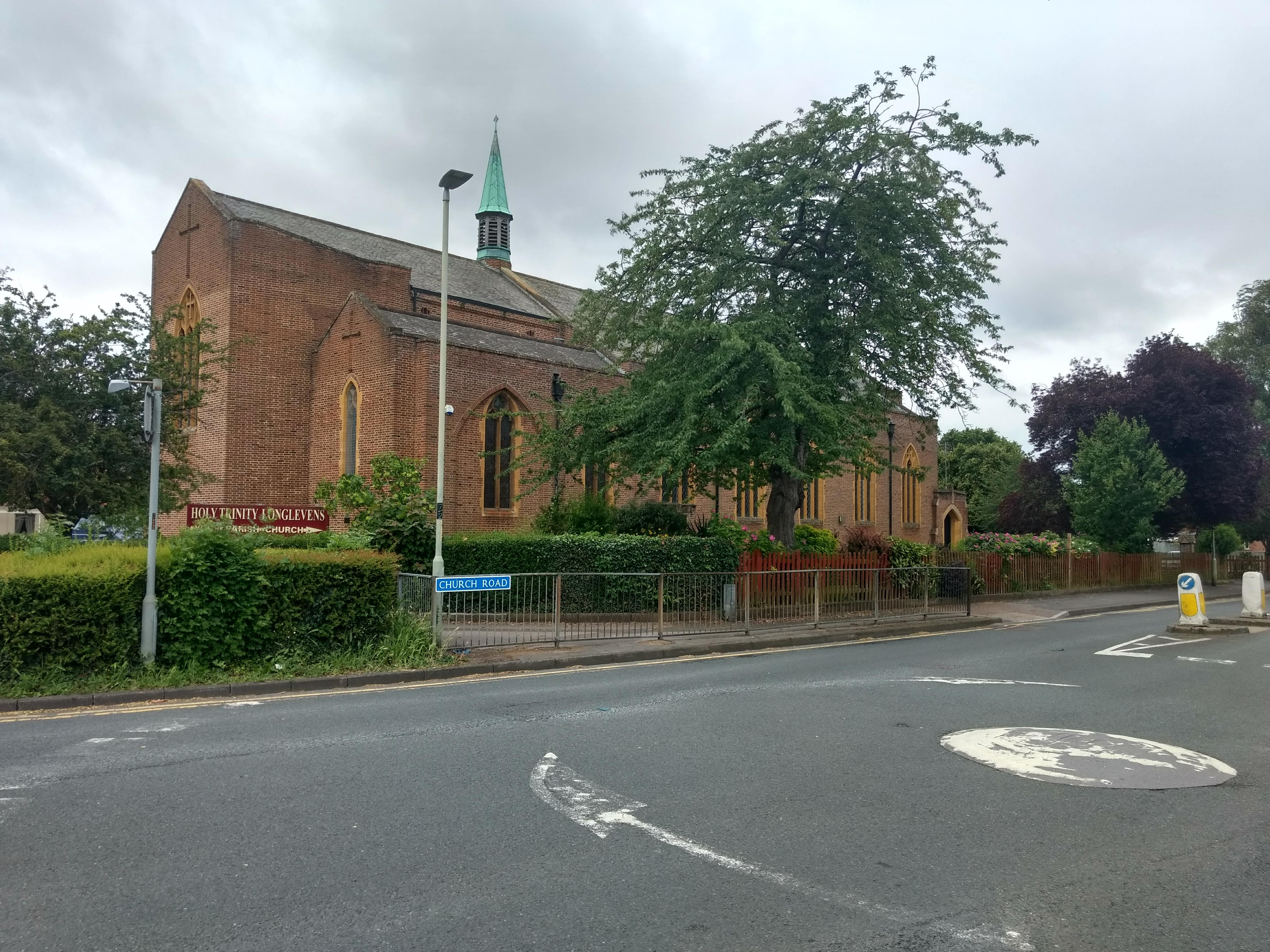
- Holy Trinity Church

- Location within Gloucestershire
- District: Gloucester
- Shire county: Gloucestershire
- Region: South West
- Country: England
- Sovereign state: United Kingdom

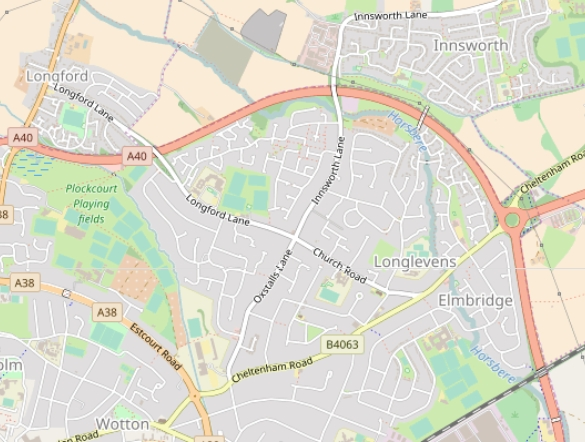
Longlevens within Gloucester.

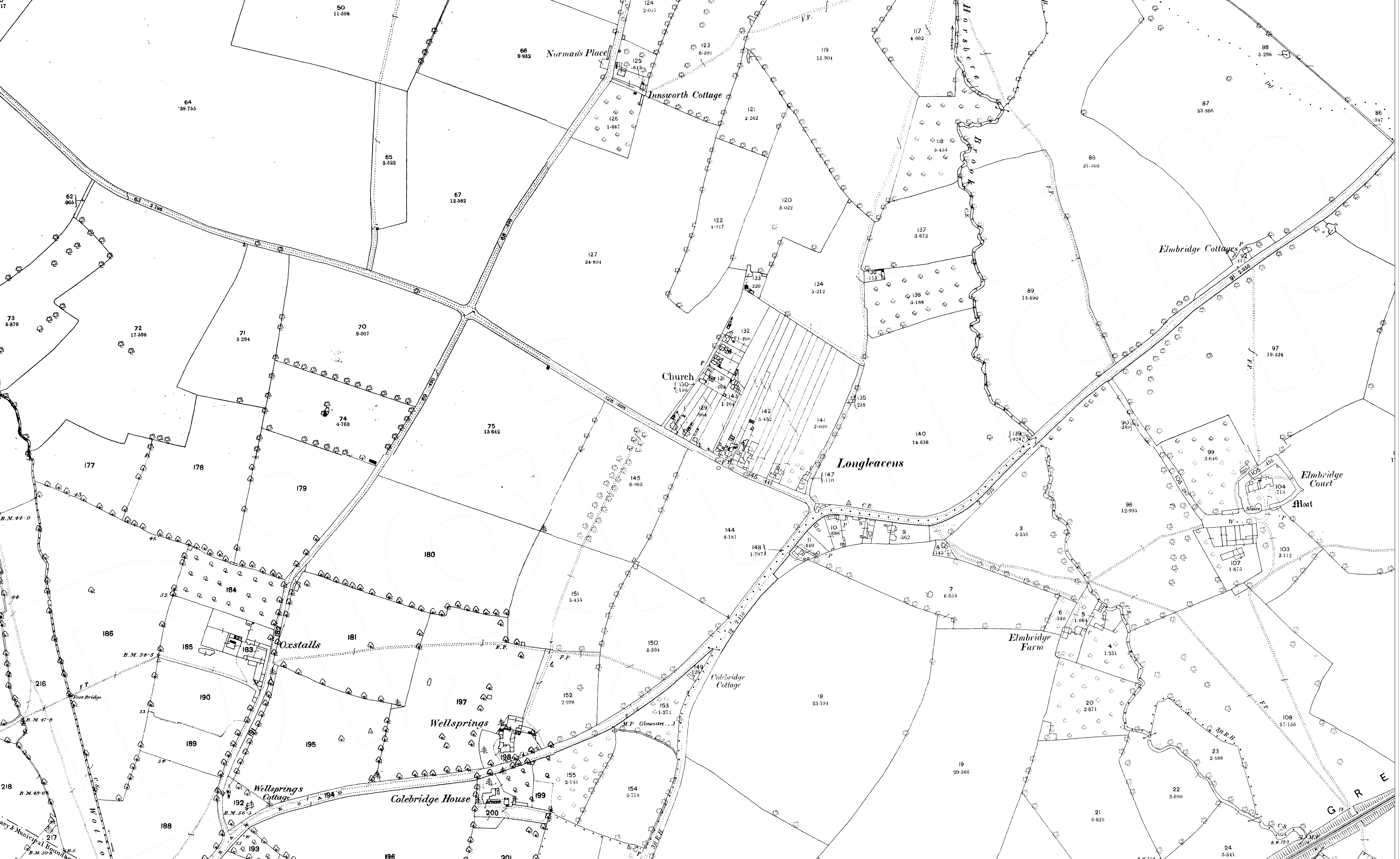
The hamlet of Longleavens on a c.1880 Ordnance Survey map. Innsworth Cottage and Norman's Place to the north, Elmbridge to the east, Oxstalls to the south.

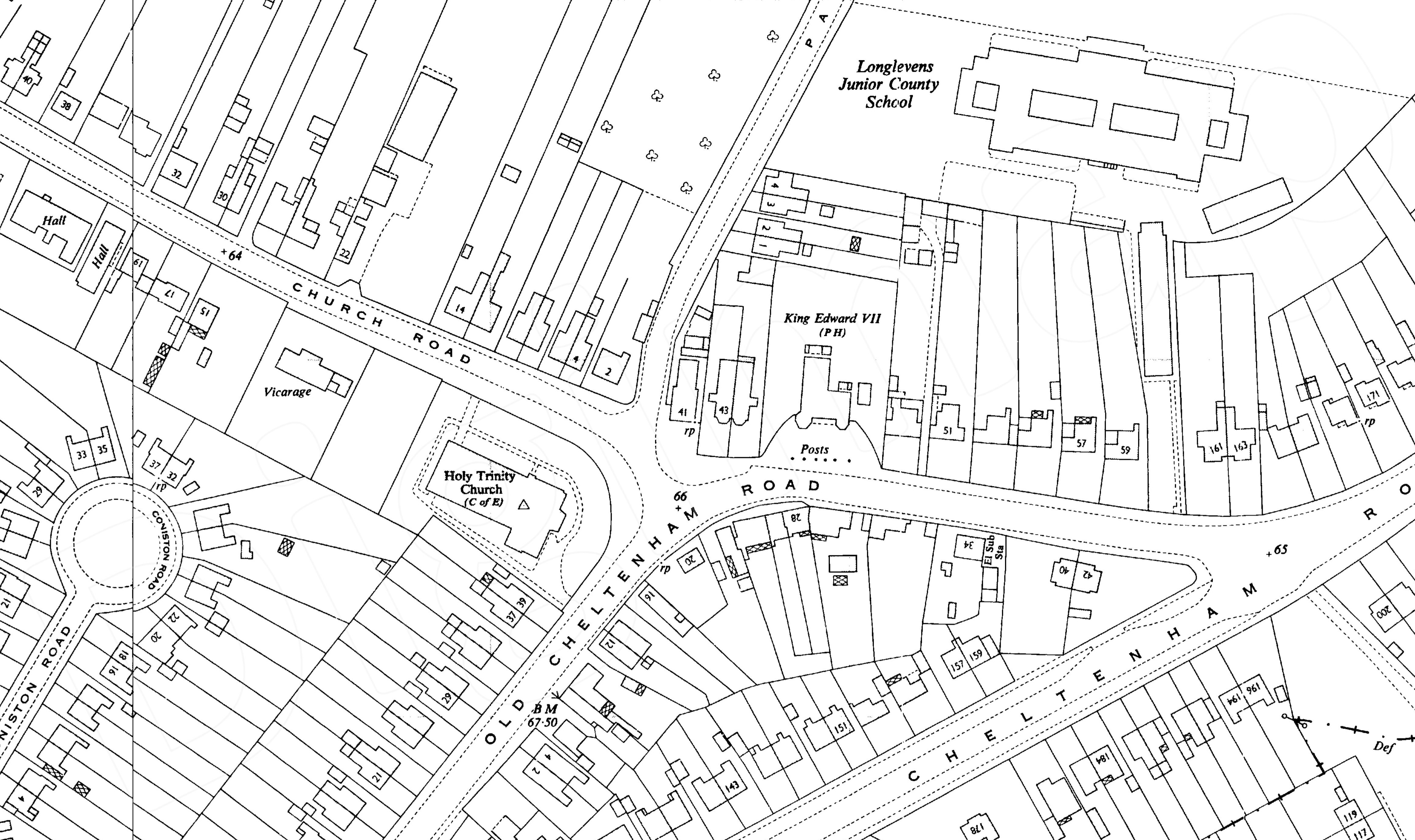
The centre of Longlevens on a 1950s Ordnance Survey map.

Longlevens, originally Longleavens, is a suburb of Gloucester, in Gloucestershire, England. It developed from a farmstead during the twentieth century, the name may be based on the old Roman name Colonia Glevensis, or the name could be based on an original field name "Long Elevens". This could have related to a long field about eleven acres therefore this could have been adopted as a name for the hamlet, first recorded in 1750, as part of the estate of Gloucester Cathedral. One of the oldest roads is 'The Avenue', which is shown on old maps as a number of farm cottages built in the 1850s for the use of agricultural labourers. The population of Longlevens was 9,532 at the time of the 2011 Census.

== History ==
Wotton St. Mary (Without), save for a few acres given to Barnwood and Churchdown, was included with parts of Barnwood, Churchdown, and Hucclecote in the new civil parish of Longlevens, north-east of Gloucester. Parts of Longlevens were added to Gloucester in 1951 and in 1967 when the remainder was re-formed as Innsworth civil parish.

Orcharding, which was increased at Innsworth in the mid 19th century, remained an important feature and in 1896 covered at least 172 a. in the parishes of Gloucester, Longford, Tuffley, Twigworth, and Wotton St. Mary (Without). The demands of Gloucester's growing population in the 19th century increased market gardening in the hamlets and by 1843 J. C. Wheeler's nurseries included a large area between Kingsholm and Wotton. In 1851 market gardeners were fairly numerous in Longford and Twigworth, and later there were several market gardens and nurseries at Longlevens (called Springfield) and Innsworth.

== Housing ==
Longlevens developed its housing from the 1880s onwards with the fields along the main routes through the original village. Plots were created in Cheltenham and Church Roads, at the Longlevens crossroads housing began to develop from the Edwardian period onward. Longford & Innsworth Lanes were simply country lanes before they became the busy throughways we know today. Gloucestershire Archives have retained many of the original plans for housing within the suburb. The earliest building control files date from 1909 when the area was under the control of the Gloucester Rural District Council.

Houses in Oxstalls Lane, Cheltenham Road and Longford Lane were constructed as private plots as the fields gave way to development. One local developer R & S Halls were responsible for constructing many of the houses we see today between the 1920s and 50s.

The Wellsprings estate began its life in 1933 when a Swindon-based builder A.J. Colborne put an application in to build 28 houses on the site. All streets within the estate are named after locations in the Lake District, apart from Wellsprings Road. Which is named after a property that used to sit on Cheltenham Road between Elmbridge Road and Oxstalls Lane. All the streets were officially named in January 1935 according to the Gloucester Journal 1st January 1935. The estate was completed by 1938. In 1948 a new section of the estate was added with the building of local authority housing called The Triangle. The contract was awarded to Ashmores (Builders) of Gloucester. The houses were completed around 1951.

== Character and facilities ==
Longlevens is primarily residential, and is home to Sir Thomas Rich's School, Holy Trinity Church, Kendal Road Baptist Church, Longlevens Junior School, Longlevens Infants School and various shops.

== Flooding ==
A small part of Longlevens was affected by the July 2007 floods; this caused Horsbere Brook, which skirts its Eastern edge to flood several homes and roads, particularly Greyhound Gardens and Cypress Gardens.

== Football and greyhound racing ==
Of clubs playing association football the most important was Gloucester City Association Football Club, originating in 1889 and re-formed in 1925. From 1935 it had its ground at Longlevens and in 1964 it moved to a new stadium in Horton Road, which was later also used for greyhound racing. A more important centre for greyhound racing was the Gloucester & Cheltenham Stadium which opened in 1933 and closed in 1983. Longlevens is home to a semi-professional team in Longlevens AFC who have a range of adult, women's, youth and junior teams playing at several locations in the area (Longford Lane, Innsworth Lane and Longlevens Infant School).
