= River Severn =

River in the United Kingdom

River Severn Welsh: Afon Hafren
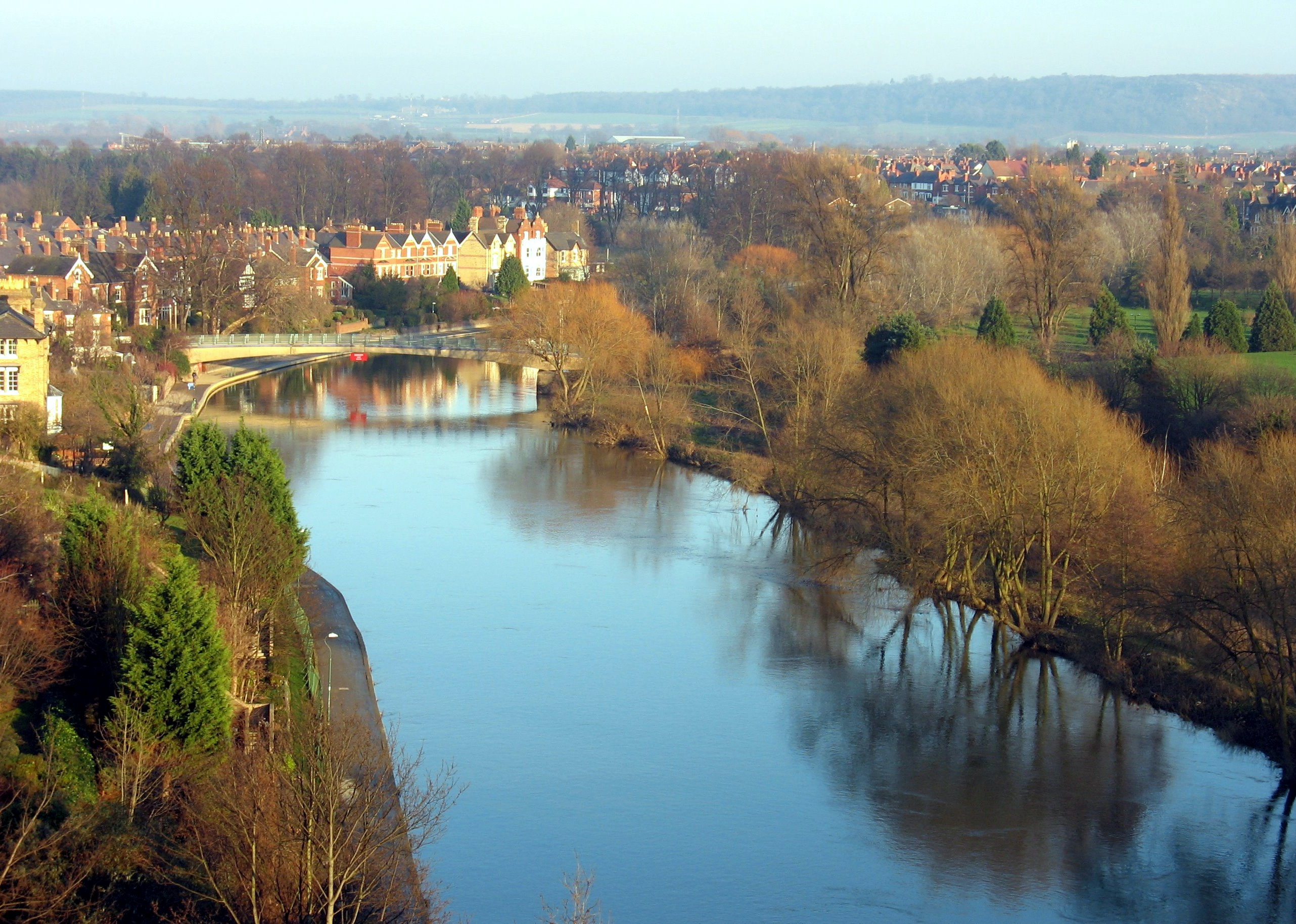
- The river seen from Shrewsbury Castle

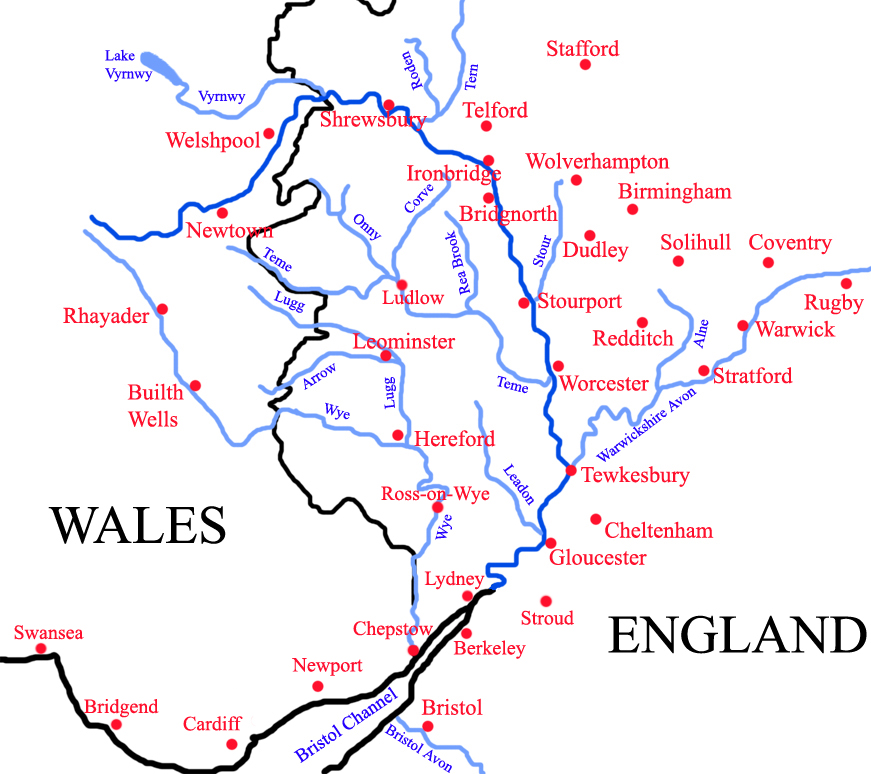
- Tributaries (light blue) and major settlements (red) on and near the Severn (dark blue)

Location
- Country: England and Wales
- Region: Mid Wales, West Midlands, South West
- Counties: Powys, Shropshire, Worcestershire, Gloucestershire
- Cities: Shrewsbury, Worcester, Gloucester, Bristol

Physical characteristics
- Source
  - location: Plynlimon, Powys, Wales
  - coordinates: 52.493464°N 3.734597°W
  - elevation: 610 m (2,000 ft)
- Mouth: Severn Estuary
  - location: Bristol Channel, United Kingdom
  - elevation: 0 m (0 ft)
- Length: 354 km (220 mi)
- Basin size: 11,420 km^{2} (4,410 sq mi)
- Discharge
  - location: Bewdley, Worcs. SO 7815 7622
  - average: 61.17 m^{3}/s (2,160 cu ft/s)
  - maximum: 533.48 m^{3}/s (18,840 cu ft/s)max recorded on 1947-03-21
- Discharge
  - location: Apperley, Glos.
  - average: 107 m^{3}/s (3,800 cu ft/s)
- Discharge
  - location: Montford, Shrops.
  - average: 43.46 m^{3}/s (1,535 cu ft/s)

Basin features
- Tributaries
  - left: Vyrnwy, Tern, Stour, Warwickshire Avon, Bristol Avon
  - right: Teme, Leadon, Wye

The River Severn (/sɛvərn/; Welsh: Afon Hafren, pronounced [ˈavɔn ˈhavrɛn]) is the longest river in Great Britain, with a length of 220 miles (354 km). It is also the river with the most voluminous flow of water by far in all of England and Wales, with an average flow rate of 107 m^{3}/s (3,800 cu ft/s) at Apperley, Gloucestershire. It rises in the Cambrian Mountains in mid Wales, at an altitude of 610 m (2,000 ft), on the Plynlimon massif, which lies close to the Ceredigion/Powys border near Llanidloes. The river then flows through Shropshire, Worcestershire and Gloucestershire. The county towns of Shrewsbury, Worcester and Gloucester lie on its course.

The Severn's major tributaries are the Vyrnwy, the Tern, the Teme, the Warwickshire Avon, and the Worcestershire Stour.

By convention, the River Severn is usually considered to end, and the Severn Estuary to begin, after the Prince of Wales Bridge, between Severn Beach in South Gloucestershire and Sudbrook, Monmouthshire. The total area of the estuary's drainage basin is 4,409 square miles (11,419 km^{2}). That figure excludes the area of the River Wye and the Bristol Avon, both of which flow into the Severn Estuary. The estuary discharges into the Bristol Channel, which opens into the Celtic Sea and from there into the Atlantic Ocean.

== Etymology ==
=== Celtic Root ===
An etymology has been proposed, which signifies that "Severn" is an anglicised version of an ancient Celtic phrase signifying "a gap (in the coastline)", referring to the estuary.

=== Romano-British name ===
The name Severn is thought to derive from a British word sabrinā, possibly from an older form *samarosina, meaning "land of summertime fallow". During the Roman occupation the Severn was known by the Romano-British Latin name Sabrina. (Note: Dictionary – Old English (Clark Hall) < Sæfern >: 1. "Severn" (Latin Sabrina).) (Note: See Ancient Rome > Language > ... The native language of the Romans was Latin.) (Note: The name was recorded in the 2nd century: Sabrinam 115–7; Sabrinā 150) (Note: See Roman Britain > Diocletian's reforms > Map of ROMAN BRITANNIA about 410 > Sabrina Aest)

=== Welsh name ===
The Welsh form of the name is Afon Hafren (pronounced [ˈavɔn ˈhavrɛn]) first recorded in the 12th-century Historia Regum Britanniae. The Old Welsh form of the name Habren was recorded c.800.

Documented history of the Welsh name:

- Habren c.800.
- Hauren c.1170.
- hahafrenn, 12th century.
- Dyffrin hawren, mid 13th century.

The toponym for Habren might be:

- High prow of a ship. (Note: Old Welsh breni – "prow of a ship".)
- High prow of a wave.

=== English name ===
The English form of the name ("Severn") is derived from Old English Sæfern. (Note: Dictionary – Old English (Clark Hall) < Sæfern >: 1. "Severn") (Note: Wiktionary: Old English < Sæfern >: 1. "Severn") However the name is also influenced by English dialect seave ("sedge, rush") hence the origin of the name Seaverne recorded in the 16th–17th century. (Note: See Rushbearing > Dialect names for rush.)

Common club-rush (Schoenoplectus lacustris) prefers to grow in shallow water such as that found in ponds, streams and river margins. (Note: Common club-rush or Bulrush. Schoenoplectus lacustris (Richard Mabey) ...."Club-rush is a stout perennial found in shallow water in lakes, ponds, canals, slow rivers ... It can reach heights of up to ten feet in height with a thickness of nearly an inch at its base ....") The Hwicce people used the club-rush growing along the banks of the River Severn to make wicker baskets. (Note: See Hwicce > Name > ... It is also likely that "Hwicce" referred to the native tribes living along the banks of the River Severn, ... who were weavers using rushes ... growing profusely to create baskets.) (Note: Common club-rush or Bulrush. Schoenoplectus lacustris (Richard Mabey) "The rounded stems are straight and jointless, which makes them ideal for plaiting and weaving into baskets, mats ....")

==== Name history ====
The name history shows evidence of Scandinavian influence: (Note: Aelfred's Britain (Max Adams) "Words loaned both ways between Old English and Old Norse ...")

Name	Year	Period	Influence
Sæferne	894 (Note: ASC 'A' sa 894 recte 893)	Viking Age	Old English sæfôr – "seafarer". (Note: Dictionary – Old English (Clark Hall) < sæfôr >: 1. "sea−voyage")
Saverna	1086	Norman Conquest	English dialect seave – "sedge, rush". (Note: Wiktionary: English dialect < seave > From Old Norse sef, whence also Danish siv, Icelandic sef and Swedish säv ("club-rush").) (Note: Wiktionary: Old Norse < sef >: 1. "sedge, rush".)
Severne	1205	13th century	English dialect seave
Sephern (Note: See also River Seph, Bilsdale, North York Moors.)	1479 (Note: "Servern id est aqua Haveren id est Sephern 1479")	15th century	Old Norse sef – "sedge, rush". (Note: Wiktionary: Old Norse < sef >: 1. "sedge, rush".)
Seaverne	1584	16th century	English dialect seave
Seaverne	1677	17th century	English dialect seave
Severn	1836	19th century	

==== Viking age ====
In the Summer of 893 a coalition of all of the Danish armies in England made a determined attempt to annex western Mercia to Danish Mercia. (Note: North-West Mercia (Wainwright) ... "It has been suggested that these raids were a deliberate attempt to annex western Mercia to Danish Mercia ... ") The Anglo-Saxon Chronicle (ASC) (Note: The ASC is written in Old English.) recorded an account of the Battle of Buttington, and included this description of the route taken by the Danes:

"... Foron þa up be Temese oþþæt hie gedydon æt Sæferne, þa up be Sæferne. (Note: ASC 'A' sa 894 recte 893) (Note: North-West Nercia (Wainwright) . . "In the Summer of 893 the two Danish Armies, supported by considerable reinforcements from the East Anglian and Northumbrian Danes, moved from Shoebury ... "up along the Thames until they came to the Severn and then up along the Severn ...") (Note: Viking Britain (Thomas Williams) "it was the exploration of England's river routes ... made possible by their light and shallow-draughted ships ... that provided Viking armies with a means of swift and efficient movement through Britain's interior ... increased the range of their attacks ... able to destabilise Anglo-Saxon kingdoms ...")

==== Seafarer ====
The Seafarer (poem)
..."þæt he a his sæfore (Note: sæfôr – "seafaring".) sorge næbbe,
to hwon hine Dryhten gedon wille."

..."that he never in his seafaring has a worry,
as to what his Lord will do to him."

— A passage in Old English poem

The name Sæfern might be related to: (Note: Aelfred's Britain (Max Adams) ..."Words loaned both ways between Old English and Old Norse ...)

1. The Sea. (Note: Dictionary – Old English ( Clark Hall ): 1. sæfaroð – "sea−coast".; 2. sæflôd – "flow of the sea".; 3. sæflota – "ship".; 4. sæfôr – "sea−voyage".)
2. Middle English faren – "travel". (Note: Wiktionary: Middle English < faren >: 1. "To move, go or travel")
3. Old Norse sær – "the sea, ocean". (Note: Wiktionary: Old Norse < sær >: 1. "the sea, ocean".)
4. Old Norse fara – "to fare, to travel". (Note: Wiktionary: Old Norse < fara >: 1. "to fare, to travel".)
5. The Old Norse personal name Sæfari – "Seafarer".

The Old Norse name Sæfari ("Seafarer") lives on as the name of the Dalvík – Grímsey ferry in Iceland. (Note: SAEFARI (IMO: 9041277) is a Passenger/Cargo Ship ...)

== Geography and geology ==
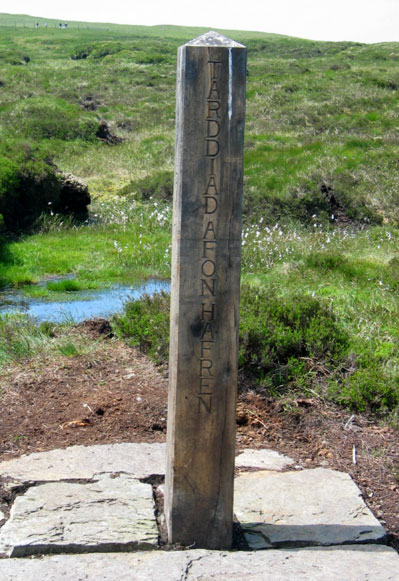
Post marked as the source of the River Severn on Plynlimon, Wales. The wording is in both English and Welsh.

The River Severn's current form is the result of a multi-million year history and complex underlying geology, shaped in part by glaciation during the last ice age in the Pleistocene epoch of the Quaternary period. Within Wales, the river runs through a landscape formed in Ordovician and Silurian rocks. As it enters the Shropshire Plain, these lower Palaeozoic rocks are replaced by Permian and Triassic age strata though largely unseen beneath a thick cover of Quaternary deposits. Certain stretches also run across Carboniferous strata as at Shrewsbury and for much of the distance between Ironbridge and Bewdley. Permo-Triassic bedrock then continues until the Severn moves intermittently onto the Jurassic outcrop from Tewkesbury southwards. Only in the SSW-NNE aligned valley either side of Welshpool is there any obvious relationship to geological structure where the valley follows the lines of the Severn Valley Fault Belt. For much of the rest of its course it runs directly across geological structures.

It was first proposed in the 1900s that the former northerly course of the upper Severn was disrupted during the ice age by the blocking of its access to the Irish Sea through Cheshire, causing a large lake to develop across much of Shropshire. It was supposed that this lake, named as Lake Lapworth, overtopped its southern margin and rapidly cut down to form the Ironbridge Gorge providing the Severn with a southerly exit to the sea as remains the case today. An alternative theory which has gained favour in recent years does away with Lake Lapworth, suggesting that the upper Severn flowed beneath the icesheet in a bedrock hollow known as the Severn Trench eastwards from Melverley to the Ironbridge Gorge. It is possible that the trench and gorge were cut over successive ice ages.

== Tributary rivers ==
Over its length, there are a large number of tributaries, but the three largest feeding the non-tidal river are the Vyrnwy, the Teme and the Warwickshire Avon. The Wye, the Bristol Avon and the Usk all flow into the estuarine section of the Severn. The main tributaries are described in sequence below.

The first tributary of significance is the Afon Dulas, joining from the south immediately upstream of Llanidloes, with the Afon Clywedog joining in the town. The Afon Cerist, bolstered by the Afon Trannon, and the Afon Carno join as left bank tributaries immediately upstream of Caersws. Mochdre Brook enters on the western edge of Newtown, followed by the Bechan Brook just northeast of the town. The Mule enters at Abermule, and the River Rhiw east of Berriew, followed shortly by the Camlad which rises above Churchstoke and by the Luggy Brook. The left bank Sylfaen Brook enters at Welshpool, and the Bele Brook via the New Cut east of Arddlin.

The River Vyrnwy, which begins at Lake Vyrnwy, flows eastwards through Powys, gathering the waters of the Banwy, Cain and Tanat, before forming part of the border between England and Wales, and joining the Severn near Melverley, Shropshire. The River Perry joins on the left bank above Shrewsbury, while both the Rad Brook and the Rea Brook, which flows northeast from its source at Marton Pool near the Welsh border, join the Severn within the town. The left bank tributary, the River Tern, after flowing south from Market Drayton and being joined by the River Meese and the River Roden, meets the Severn at Attingham Park.

The River Worfe joins the Severn's left bank just above Bridgnorth, before the Mor, Borle and Dowles brooks join on the opposite bank over the next few miles, the last-named draining Wyre Forest. The River Stour rises in the north of Worcestershire in the Clent Hills, near St Kenelm's Church at Romsley. It flows north into the adjacent West Midlands at Halesowen. It then flows westwards through Cradley Heath and Stourbridge, where it leaves the Black Country. It is joined by the Smestow Brook at Prestwood before it winds around southwards to Kinver, and then flows back into Worcestershire. It then passes through Wolverley, Kidderminster and Wilden to its confluence with the Severn at Stourport-on-Severn. The Dick Brook, Shrawley Brook and Grimley Brook enter on the right bank before the River Salwarpe, which runs through Droitwich enters on the opposite (east) bank.

The River Teme flows eastwards from its source in Mid Wales, straddling the border between Shropshire and Herefordshire; it is joined by the River Onny, River Corve and River Rea before it finally joins the Severn on the southern edge of Worcester. Bushley Brook joins just upstream of the confluence of the Warwickshire Avon with the Severn at Tewkesbury. One of several Avons, this one flows west through Rugby, Warwick and Stratford-upon-Avon. It is then joined by its tributary the River Arrow, before joining the Severn. The rivers Swilgate and Chelt also join the Severn's left bank, as do the Hatherley and Horsbere brooks, before it reaches Gloucester. The River Leadon enters the tidal West Channel of the Severn at Over, immediately west of Gloucester. The River Frome is the second significant tributary to enter the tidal stretch of the Severn, doing so at Framilode. Bideford Brook drains the easternmost part of the Forest of Dean, entering the Severn estuary east of Blakeney. On the opposite (southeast) bank the flow of the River Cam is usurped by the Gloucester and Sharpness Canal before reaching the estuary. The Lyd enters the west bank of the estuary at Lydney Harbour, opposite the place where Berkeley Pill carries the waters of the Little Avon River into it. The final tributary before the Severn Bridge is the collection of streams which enter via Oldbury Pill.

The River Wye, from its source in Plynlimon in Wales (2 miles (3 km) from the source of the Severn), flows generally south east through the Welsh towns of Rhayader and Builth Wells. It enters Herefordshire, flows through Hereford, and is shortly afterwards joined by the River Lugg, before flowing through Ross-on-Wye and Monmouth, and then southwards where it forms part of the border between England (Forest of Dean) and Wales. The Wye flows into the Severn estuary south of the town of Chepstow.

The Mounton Brook and Nedern Brooks enter on the Monmouthshire side between the two motorway crossings. The Port of Bristol is on the Severn Estuary, where another River Avon flows into it through the Avon Gorge. The River Usk and the Ebbw River flow into the Severn Estuary at Uskmouth just south of Newport.

== Settlements ==
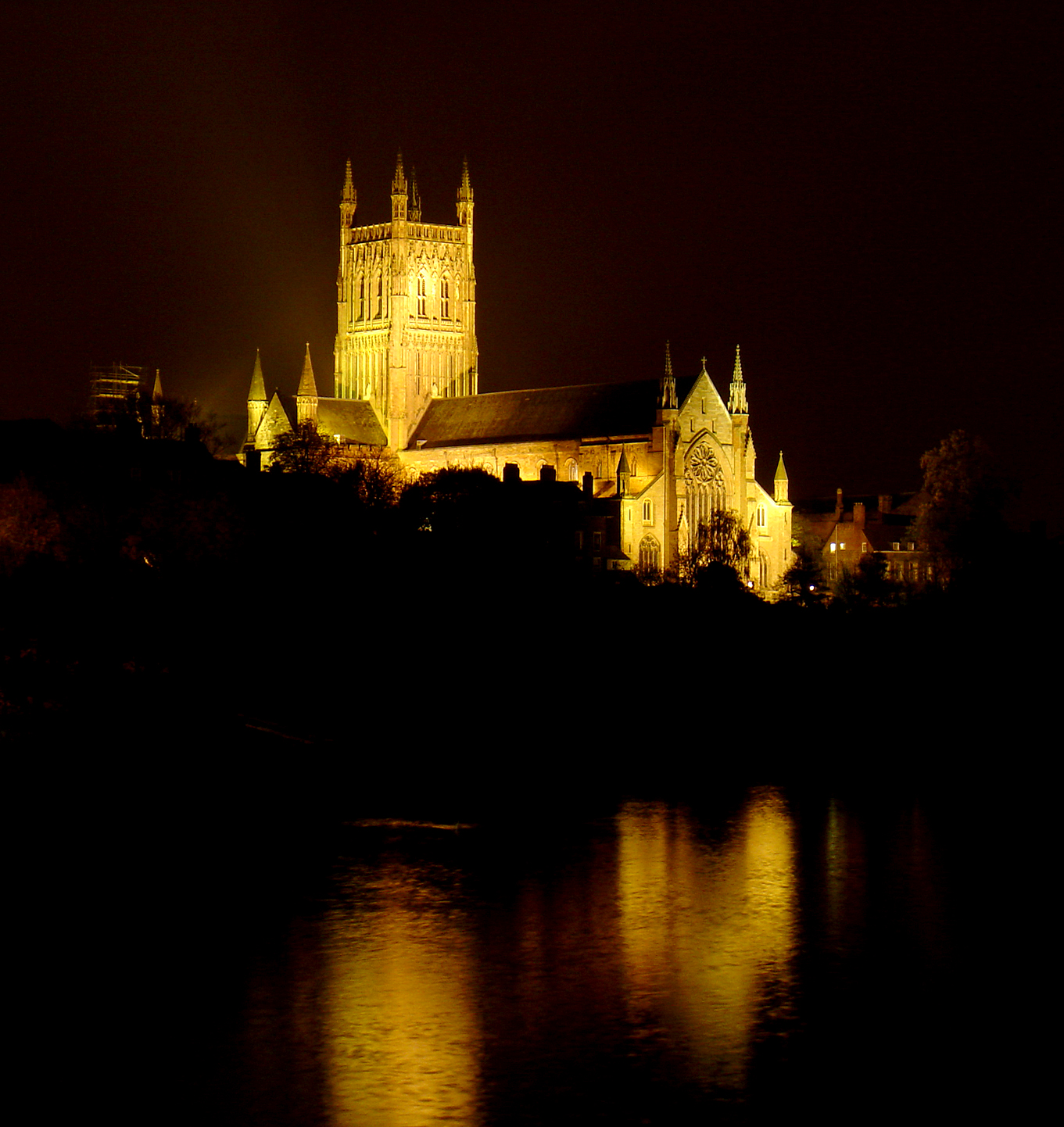
Worcester Cathedral overlooking the Severn

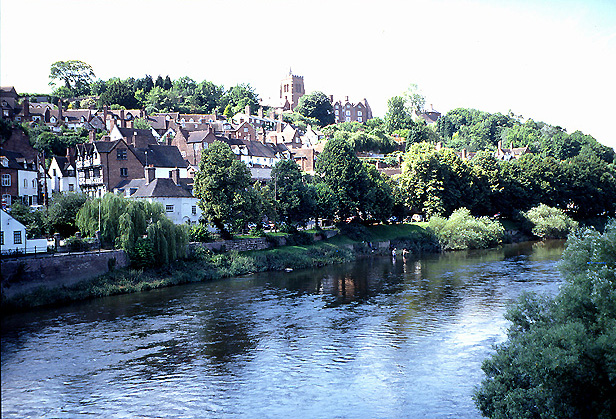
High Town, Bridgnorth.

The river's course within Wales lies wholly within the county of Powys. The first town it encounters downstream of its source is Llanidloes where it is joined by the Dulas and the Clywedog. It flows past the villages of Llandinam and Caersws before reaching Newtown. It then runs by Abermule and Cilcewydd before flowing beside Welshpool, the last town on its course in Wales.

Entering Shropshire and England, a few villages such as Shrawardine sit back from the river as it meanders eastwards towards the county town of Shrewsbury. More villages, notably Atcham, Wroxeter and Cressage sit beside the river as it turns southeast and heads for the gorge at Ironbridge before turning south for Bridgnorth. The Shropshire villages of Quatford and Hampton Loade and the Worcestershire village of Upper Arley follow, before the Severn runs through Bewdley and Stourport-on-Severn in quick succession. The river then passes the villages of Astley Burf and Holt Fleet before entry into the city of Worcester. Several villages sit back from the river before it runs by Upton upon Severn and then enters Gloucestershire as it joins with the Warwickshire Avon outside of Tewkesbury. A few more villages intervene, notable amongst which is Maisemore before the river enters the city of Gloucester from which point it is tidal.

Several more villages sit beside the tidal stretch. Amongst these are Elmore, Epney and Framilode on the east bank and Minsterworth, Broadoak and Newnham on Severn on the west bank.

== Transport ==
=== Bridges ===
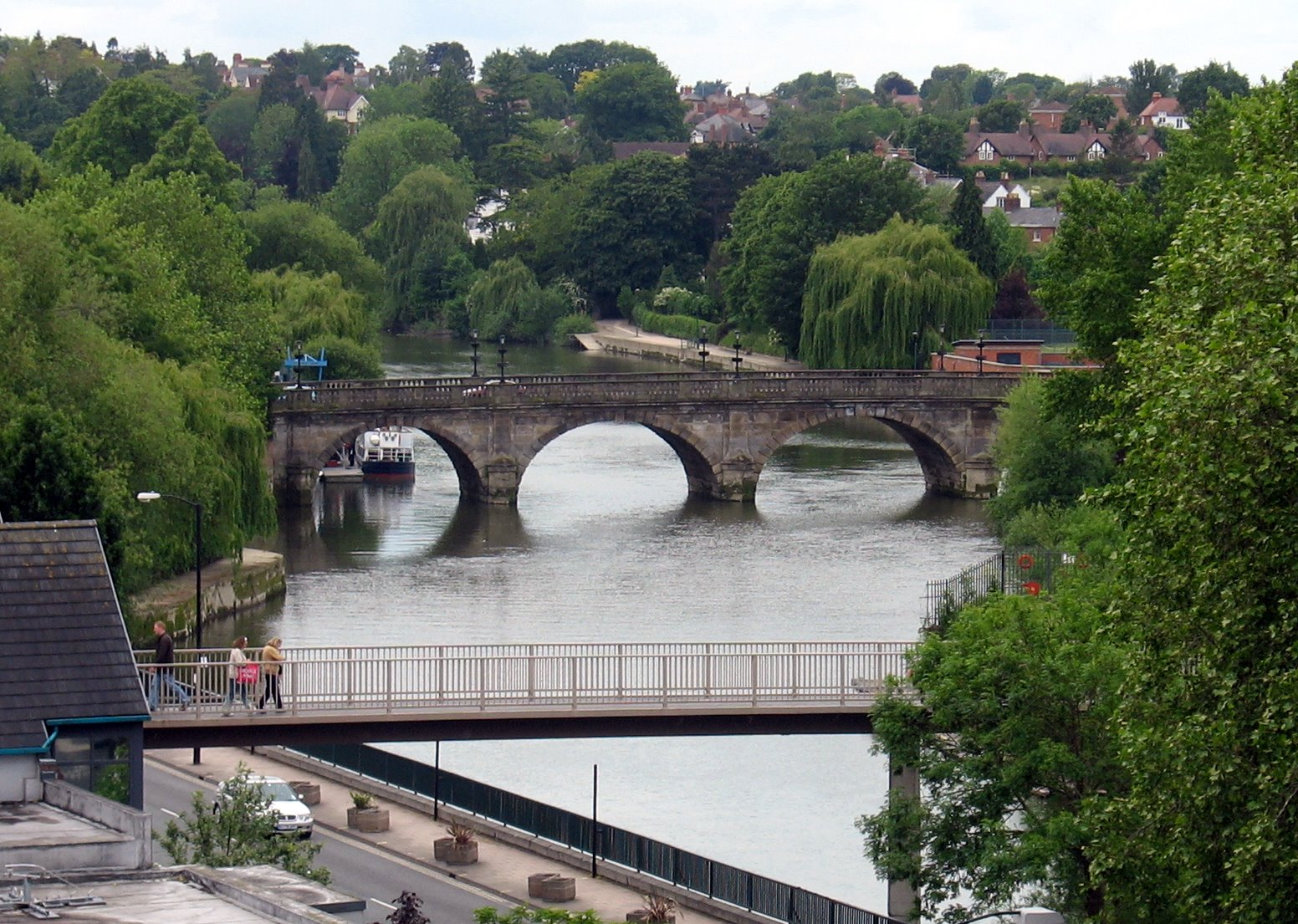
The Welsh Bridge (background) and Frankwell Footbridge (foreground) in Shrewsbury, Shropshire.

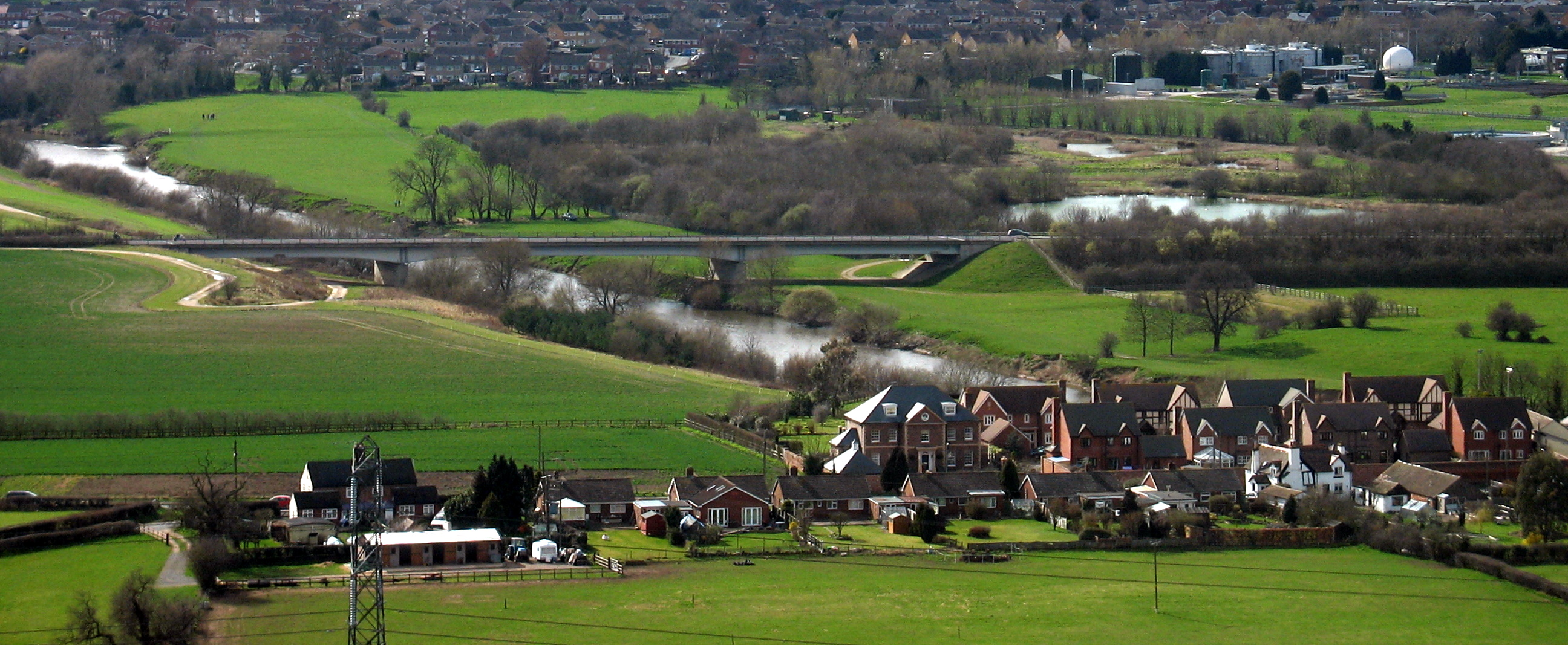
The Severn bridged by the A49 road just outside Shrewsbury. The village of Uffington, Shropshire is in the foreground.

The Severn is bridged at many places, and many of these bridges are notable in their own right. The Iron Bridge at Ironbridge was the world's first iron arch bridge. Several other bridges crossing the river were designed and built by the engineer Thomas Telford.

The two major road bridges of the Severn crossing link south eastern Wales with the southern counties of England.

- Severn Bridge – opened in 1966 carrying what is now the M48
- Prince of Wales Bridge – opened in 1996 carrying the M4 motorway, known as the Second Severn Crossing until 2018

Prior to the construction of the first bridge in 1966, the channel was crossed by the Aust Ferry.

Other notable bridges include:

- Buttington Bridge – built in 1872
- Montford Bridge – Thomas Telford's first ever bridge design, built between 1790 and 1792
- Welsh Bridge – in the centre of Shrewsbury, built in 1795 at a cost of £8,000
- English Bridge – also in Shrewsbury, designed and completed in 1774 by John Gwynn
- Atcham Bridges – the old one built in 1774, while the newer one in 1929 carries the B4380
- Albert Edward Bridge – in Coalbrookdale, a railway bridge opened in 1864
- Coalport Bridge – like its neighbour Ironbridge, is made of cast iron, built in 1818
- Victoria Bridge – designed by John Fowler, opened in 1862. Still in use by the Severn Valley Railway
- Bewdley Bridge – designed by Telford, completed in 1798
- Holt Fleet Bridge – in Worcestershire and designed by Telford and opened in 1828
- Upton Town Bridge – built in 1940, the only bridge to cross between Worcester and Tewkesbury
- Queenshill Viaduct – carries the M50 between Junction 1 and 2
- Mythe Bridge – designed by Telford and opened in April 1826, located in Tewkesbury
- Haw Bridge – a steel beam bridge, west of Tewkesbury
- Maisemore Bridge – carries the A417 and is a single masonry arch, dating back to 1230.
- Over Bridge – single masonry arch, built by Telford
- Over Rail Bridge – carrying the Gloucester to Newport Line, currently the last bridge before the Severn Crossings, which is 30 miles (48 km) downstream
- Severn Rail Bridge – linking the Forest of Dean to Sharpness docks, partially collapsed in 1960 and was dismantled in 1967–70

=== Rail ===
The Severn Tunnel, completed in 1886 by John Hawkshaw on behalf of the Great Western Railway, lies near the Second Severn Crossing road bridge, and carries the South Wales Main Line section of the Great Western Main Line under the channel. The original line built before the Severn Tunnel was the South Wales Railway from Gloucester, that followed the estuary alongside present day stations of Lydney, Chepstow, Caldicot and Severn Tunnel Junction to Newport.

Cars could also be transported through the Severn Tunnel. In the 1950s three trains a day made round trips between Severn Tunnel Junction and Pilning. The vehicles were loaded onto open flat bed carriages and pulled by a small pannier tank locomotive, although sometimes they were joined to a scheduled passenger train. The prudent owner paid to cover the vehicle with a sheet, as sparks often flew when the steam locomotive tackled the slope leading to the tunnel exit. A railway coach was provided for passengers and drivers. Reservations could be made and the fee for the car was about thirty shillings (£1.50) in the early 1950s.

=== Disasters ===
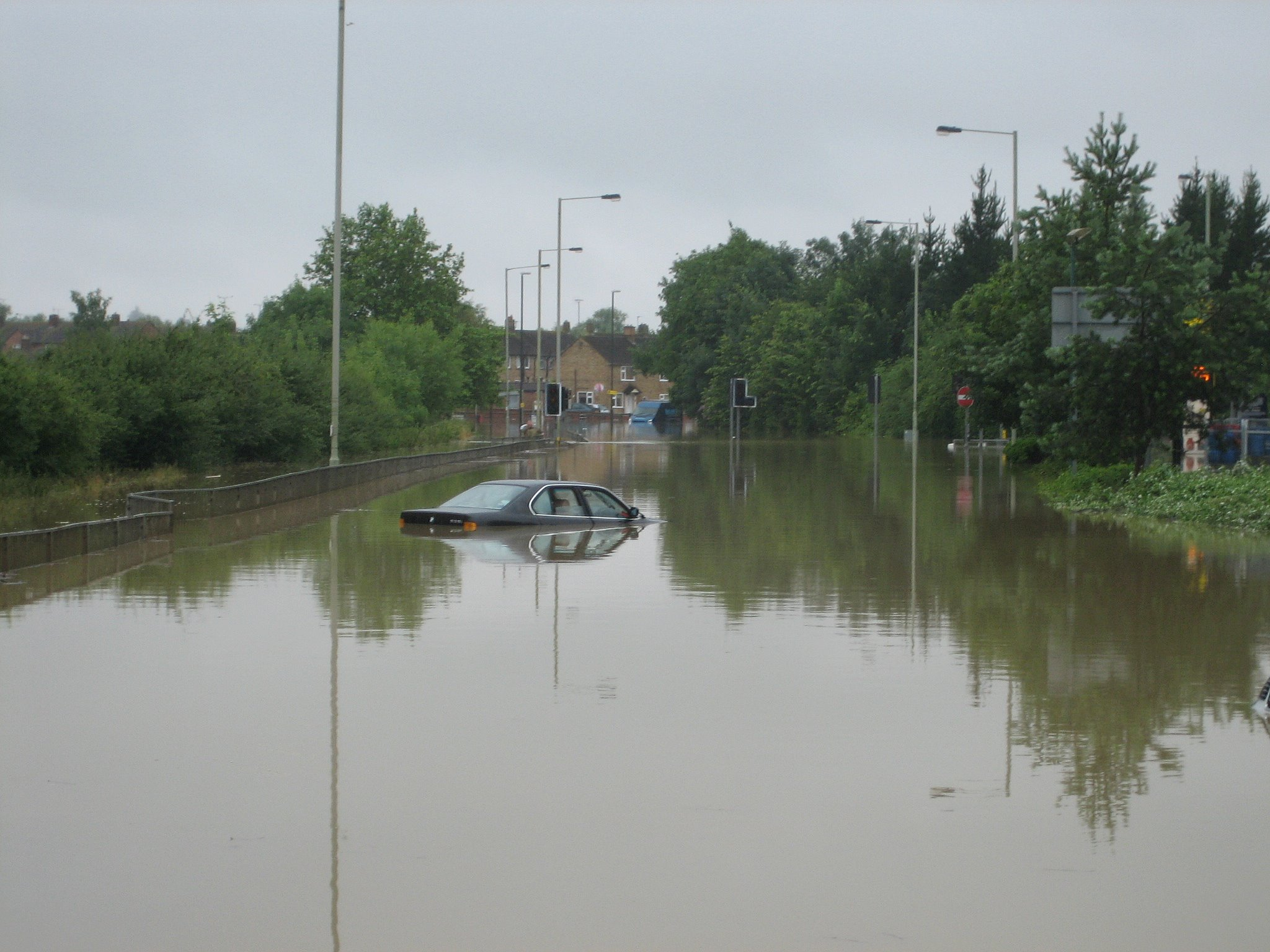
Tewkesbury during the 2007 floods

There have been many disasters on the Severn, which have claimed perhaps 300 lives, depending on sources, especially during the 20th century. The Severn Railway Bridge was badly damaged by the collision of two river barges in 1960, which led to its demolition in 1970. Five crew members of both the Arkendale H and Wastdale H died in the accident. There have been frequent floods in Shrewsbury, Bewdley and elsewhere. More recently the river flooded during the 2007 United Kingdom floods and the 2019–20 United Kingdom floods.

=== Navigation ===
Severn Navigation Act 1842
- Act of Parliament
- Parliament of the United Kingdom
- Long title: An Act for improving the Navigation of the Severn from the Entrance Lock of the Gloucester and Berkeley Canal, and from the Entrance Lock of the Herefordshire and Gloucestershire Canal, in the County of Gloucester, to Gladder or Whitehouse Brook in the County of Worcester.
- Citation: 5 & 6 Vict. c. xxiv

Dates
- Royal assent: 13 May 1842

Text of statute as originally enacted

Severn Navigation Act 1843
- Act of Parliament
- Parliament of the United Kingdom
- Long title: An Act to enable the Company of Proprietors of the Staffordshire and Worcestershire Canal Navigation to lend certain Sums of Money to the Commissioners for the Improvement of the Navigation of the River Severn, and to guarantee the Repayment of the Amount of any Loans which any other Persons or Bodies shall make to such Commissioners, and to guarantee the Performance of Contracts into which such Commissioners shall enter, and to borrow Money for such Purposes.
- Citation: 6 & 7 Vict. c. v

Dates
- Royal assent: 3 April 1843

Text of statute as originally enacted

Severn Navigation Act 1844
- Act of Parliament
- Parliament of the United Kingdom
- Long title: An Act to alter and extend the Provisions of an Act for improving the Navigation of the River Severn.
- Citation: 7 & 8 Vict. c. x

Dates
- Royal assent: 10 May 1844
Other legislation
Amends	Severn Navigation Act 1842

Severn Navigation Act 1846
- Act of Parliament
- Parliament of the United Kingdom
- Long title: An Act to alter and extend the Provisions of the Acts for improving the Navigation of the River Severn.
- Citation: 9 & 10 Vict. c. ccxci

Dates
- Royal assent: 27 July 1846

Severn Navigation Act 1853
- Act of Parliament
- Parliament of the United Kingdom
- Long title: An Act for making certain Improvements in the River Severn, and for amending the Acts relating thereto.
- Citation: 16 & 17 Vict. c. xlvii

Dates
- Royal assent: 14 June 1853

Text of statute as originally enacted

Severn Navigation Act 1856
- Act of Parliament
- Parliament of the United Kingdom
- Long title: An Act to render more effectual the Powers of raising Money given by "The Severn Navigation Act, 1853," and for other Purposes.
- Citation: 19 & 20 Vict. c. cxxxi

Dates
- Royal assent: 29 July 1856

Text of statute as originally enacted

Severn Navigation Act 1869
- Act of Parliament
- Parliament of the United Kingdom
- Long title: An Act for further improving the Navigation of the River Severn, and for amending and extending the Severn Navigation Acts; and for other purposes.
- Citation: 32 & 33 Vict. c. ciii

Dates
- Royal assent: 12 July 1869

Text of statute as originally enacted

Severn Navigation Act 1881
- Act of Parliament
- Parliament of the United Kingdom
- Long title: An Act to increase the number of the Severn Commissioners; to regulate and alter the construction of their Weirs; to amend the Severn Navigation Acts; and for other purposes.
- Citation: 44 & 45 Vict. c. ccv

Dates
- Royal assent: 22 August 1881

Text of statute as originally enacted

Severn Navigation Act 1890
- Act of Parliament
- Parliament of the United Kingdom
- Long title: An Act for further improving the Navigation of the River Severn for conferring additional powers on the Severn Commissioners and for other purposes.
- Citation: 53 & 54 Vict. c. clv

Dates
- Royal assent: 4 August 1890

Text of statute as originally enacted

Severn Navigation Act 1914
- Act of Parliament
- Parliament of the United Kingdom
- Long title: An Act to amend the Acts relating to the Severn Navigation and to confer further powers on the Severn Commissioners and for other purposes.
- Citation: 4 & 5 Geo. 5. c. xlii

Dates
- Royal assent: 8 July 1914

Text of statute as originally enacted

Severn Navigation Act 1920
- Act of Parliament
- Parliament of the United Kingdom
- Long title: An Act to confer further powers on the Severn Commissioners.
- Citation: 10 & 11 Geo. 5. c. xxiv

Dates
- Royal assent: 2 July 1920

Severn Navigation Act 1935
- Act of Parliament
- Parliament of the United Kingdom
- Long title: An Act to make further provision with respect to the tolls and charges applicable to the Severn Navigation and for other purposes.
- Citation: 25 & 26 Geo. 5. c. ciii

Dates
- Royal assent: 2 August 1935

Text of statute as originally enacted

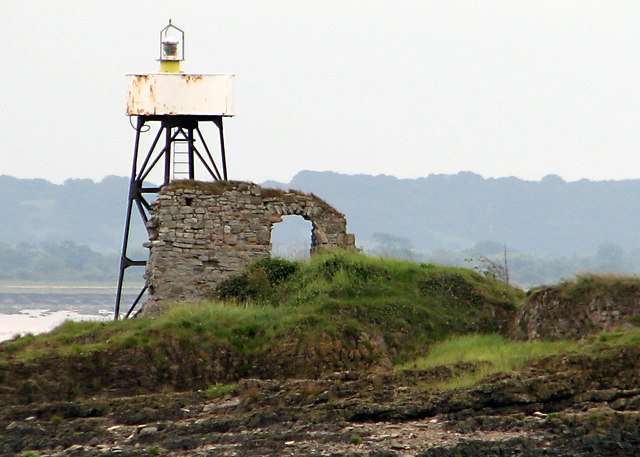
Navigation light on St Twrog's Island near Beachley

There is a public right of navigation between Pool Quay, near Welshpool, and Stourport. However this stretch of the river has little traffic, other than small boats, canoes and some tour boats in Shrewsbury.

The river between Gloucester and Stourport is the Severn Navigation, originally managed and regulated by the Severn Commissioners, who were created by the Severn Navigation Act 1842 (5 & 6 Vict. c. xxiv). The commissioners took tolls from craft using the river, and constructed locks and weirs at Diglis, Bevere, Holt, Lincomb and Upper Lode. The commissioners were dissolved in 1948; the Transport Act 1947 transferred responsibility for the navigation to the new British Transport Commission. From 1963 this became the British Waterways Board, and in 2012, they were succeeded by the Canal & River Trust, who as of 2026 are the navigation authority. The river here is more navigable for larger craft: users must obtain permits from the Canal & River Trust. During spring freshet the river can be closed to navigation.

At Upper Parting above Gloucester, the river divides into two, and flows either side of Alney Island to Lower Parting. The West Channel is no longer navigable. The East Channel is navigable as far as Gloucester Docks, from where the Gloucester and Sharpness Canal provides a navigable channel south. Between the docks and Lower Parting Llanthony Weir marks the Normal Tidal Limit (NTL) of the East Channel of the river.

In the tidal section of the river below Gloucester, the Gloucester Harbour Trustees are the competent harbour authority. The trustees maintain navigation lights at various points along the river (including on Chapel Rock and Lyde Rock, and leading lights at Slime Road, Sheperdine and Berkeley Pill).

=== Locks ===
There are locks on the lower Severn to enable seagoing boats to reach as far as Stourport. The most northerly lock is at Lincomb, about 1 mile (1.6 km) downstream from Stourport.

=== Associated canals ===
The Staffordshire and Worcestershire Canal, the Worcester and Birmingham Canal, (both narrow beam) and the Herefordshire and Gloucestershire Canal join the Severn at Stourport, Worcester and Gloucester respectively. The Droitwich Barge Canal, a broad beam canal, joins the Severn at Hawford, near to the River Salwarpe, and connects to the Droitwich Canal (narrow beam) in the name town, which then forms a link to the Worcester and Birmingham Canal. The two Droitwich canals re-opened in 2010 after major restoration.

The Gloucester and Sharpness Canal connects the Severn at Gloucester to the Severn at Sharpness, avoiding a stretch of the tidal river which is dangerous to navigate. The Stroudwater Navigation used to join the tidal Severn at Framilode, but since the 1920s has connected to the Severn only via the Gloucester and Sharpness Canal.

The Lydney Canal is a short canal which connects Lydney to the river.

The section of the river between Tewkesbury and Worcester forms part of the Avon Ring, a 109-mile (175 km) circular cruising route which includes 129 locks and covers parts of three other waterways.

=== Passenger transport ===
==== The tidal river ====
Paddle steamers were operated in the Severn Estuary from the mid 19th century to the late 1970s by P & A Campbell of Bristol. The vessels, Cardiff Queen, Bristol Queen, Glen Usk, Glen Gower and Britannia all operated on this route in the 1950s and 1960s. Since 1986 Waverley Excursions has operated occasional sailings to Sharpness and Lydney by the MV Balmoral.

A number of ferries were also operated on the tidal river, for example at New Passage, Purton and Arlingham. The last ferry was the Aust Ferry, which closed in 1966 when the Severn Bridge opened. One of the Aust ferries, Severn Princess, is still in Chepstow although largely derelict.

==== The upper river ====
Currently the only passenger boat operating between Shrewsbury and Gloucester is the River King vessel that operates in Stourport. Worcester River Cruises used to run boat trips up and down the river between Tewkesbury and Stourport, operating the boats The Pride of the Midlands and The Earl Grosvenor.

The Cathedral Ferry, a foot passenger ferry, also operates on summer weekends from the steps of Worcester Cathedral.

In Shropshire the Hampton Loade Ferry used to operate across the river but has been closed since 2016.

In Shrewsbury, boat trips around the loop of the town centre are at present provided by the Sabrina and depart from Victoria Quay near the Welsh Bridge during the summer.

== Severn Estuary ==
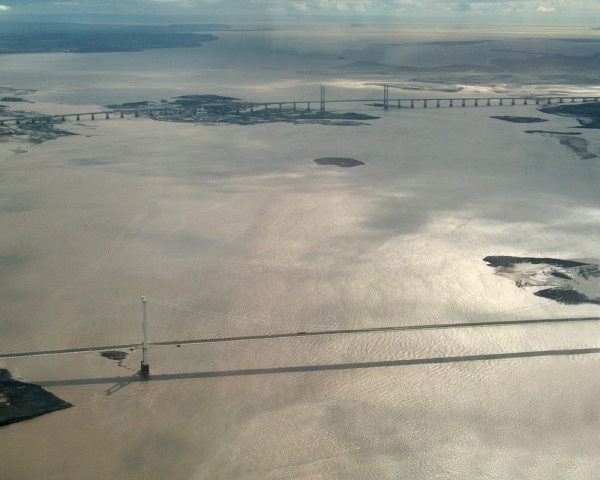
The Severn bridges crossing near the mouth of the River Severn

The river becomes tidal close to Maisemore, on the West Channel just north of Gloucester, and at Llanthony Weir on the East Channel. However, particularly high tides may overtop the weir at Tewkesbury, and even the foot of the weir at Worcester may experience a rise in water level of 1 foot (30 cm) or so.

The tidal river downstream from Gloucester is sometimes referred to as the Severn Estuary, but the river is usually considered to become the Severn Estuary after the Prince of Wales Bridge near Severn Beach, South Gloucestershire (the point to which the jurisdiction of the Gloucester Harbour Trustees extends), or at Aust, the site of the Severn Bridge.

The Severn Estuary extends to a line from Lavernock Point (south of Cardiff) to Sand Point near Weston-super-Mare. West of this line is the Bristol Channel. In the Severn Estuary (or the Bristol Channel in the last two cases, depending where the boundary is drawn) are the rocky islands called Denny Island, Steep Holm and Flat Holm.

The estuary is about 2 miles (3 km) wide at Aust, and about 9 miles (14 km) wide between Cardiff and Weston-super-Mare.

== Severn Sea ==
Until Tudor times the Bristol Channel was known as the Severn Sea, and it is still known as this in both Welsh and Cornish (Môr Hafren and Mor Havren respectively, with môr meaning sea).

== Severn bore ==
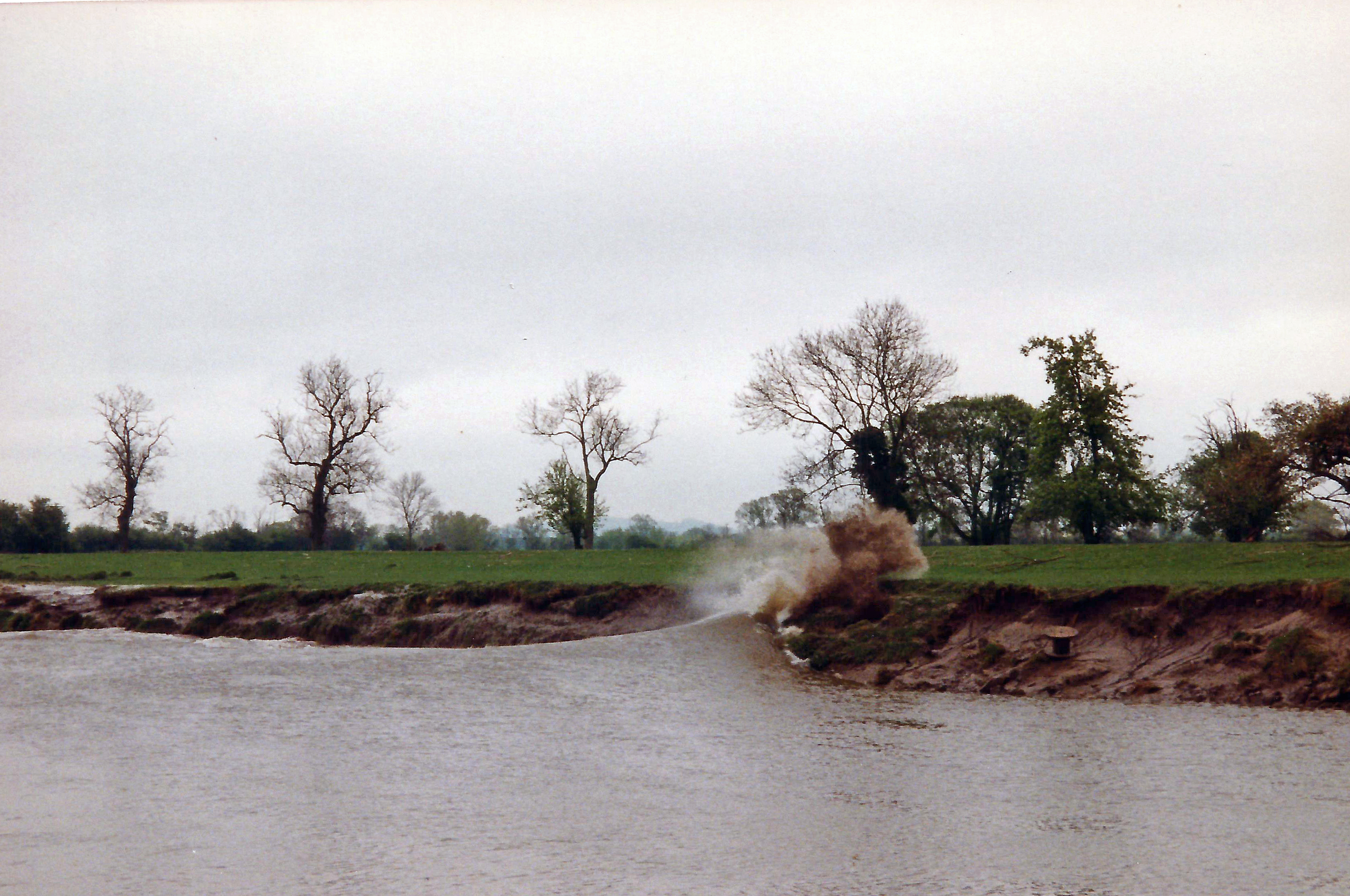
Bore hitting the riverbank in 1994

A phenomenon associated with the lower reaches of the Severn is the tidal bore, which forms upstream of the port of Sharpness.

It is frequently asserted that the river's estuary, which empties into the Bristol Channel, has the second largest tidal range in the world—48 feet (15 m), exceeded only by the Bay of Fundy. However a tidal range greater than that of the Severn is recorded from the lesser known Ungava Bay in Canada. During the highest tides, the rising water is funnelled up the Severn estuary into a wave that travels rapidly upstream against the river current. The largest bores occur in spring, but smaller ones can be seen throughout the year. The bore is accompanied by a rapid rise in water level which continues for about one and a half hours after the bore has passed.

== Industry ==
A 3-mile (4.8 km) stretch of the River Severn in Shropshire, is known as Ironbridge Gorge. It was designated a World Heritage Site by UNESCO in 1986. Its historic importance is due to its role as the centre of the iron industry in the early stages of the Industrial Revolution. The gorge and the village of Ironbridge get their name from the Iron Bridge across the Severn, built in 1779, which was the first cast-iron arch bridge ever constructed.

Two nuclear power stations are situated on the river, in the area of South Gloucestershire. Oldbury Nuclear Power Station and Berkeley Nuclear Power Station both made use of the River Severn as part of the power generation and nuclear cooling processes. Both are now decommissioned.

== Wildlife ==
The sides of the estuary are also important feeding grounds for waders, notably at the Bridgwater Bay National Nature Reserve and the Slimbridge Wildfowl Trust. River shingle habitat can also be found on the lower estuary, notable for its population of the endangered 5-spot Ladybird.

Before the installation of the weirs, sturgeon and grey seals would regularly reach as far upstream as Worcester. In the winter of 2011/2012 a female grey seal spent several weeks on the river in Bewdley. The same individual was seen at and around Worcester from October to December 2013.

The river forms part of the Severn-Trent flyway, a route used by migratory birds to cross Great Britain.

== In culture ==
Milton's 1634 masque Comus makes Sabrina a nymph who had drowned in the river. In Shrewsbury, there is now a statue of Sabrina in the Dingle Gardens at the Quarry, as well as a metal sculpture erected in 2013.

There is a different deity associated with the Severn Estuary: Nodens, represented as mounted on a seahorse, riding on the crest of the Severn bore.

The River Severn is named several times in A. E. Housman's A Shropshire Lad (1896): "It dawns in Asia, tombstones show/And Shropshire names are read;/And the Nile spills his overflow/Beside the Severn's dead" ("1887"); "Severn stream" ("The Welsh Marches"); and "Severn shore" ("Westward from the high-hilled plain...").

In Shakespeare's Henry IV, Part 1, Henry "Hotspur" Percy recalls the valour of Edmund Mortimer, 5th Earl of March in a long battle against Welshman Owain Glyndŵr upon the banks of the Severn, claiming the flooding Severn "affrighted with [the warriors'] bloody looks ran fearfully among the trembling reeds and hid his crisp head in the hollow bank, bloodstained with these valiant combatants."

The Severn was the inspiration for a number of works by Gloucestershire composer Ivor Gurney, including the songs "Western Sailors" (1925) and "Severn Meadows" (1917).

Gloucestershire writer and poet Brian Waters published Severn Tide with J. M. Dent in 1947 and followed it with Severn Stream in 1949. With anecdotal stories about his travels, both books tell of the lives of the people who lived and worked on and along the river, describing the landscape with a poet's eye. Waters links Nodens with the Severn Bore and the association of the Celtic deity with the river is explored at length by Rogers.

Several 20th-century English composers wrote works inspired by the river. Gerald Finzi (1901–1956) wrote A Severn Rhapsody, his Opus 3, in 1923; taking the Severn River and its surrounding countryside as his inspiration. Edward Elgar (1857–1934) wrote The Severn Suite, Opus 87, in 1930. Elgar lived much of both his early life and his later life near Worcester, through which the Severn runs. Herbert Howells (1892–1983), born close to the Severn in Lydney, wrote the complex Missa Sabrinensis (Mass of the Severn) in 1954, and an earlier hymn tune simply entitled Severn.

The Severn is often mentioned in Ellis Peters' The Cadfael Chronicles, set in or around Shrewsbury Abbey, beside the river.

In Julian Barnes' 2011 novel, The Sense of an Ending, Tony, the main character, recalls "a river rushing nonsensically upstream, its wave and wash lit by half a dozen chasing torchbeams," an allusion to a visit to the Severn Bore.

In the song "The Last Bristolian Pirate" by The Longest Johns, a disgruntled farmer decides to become a pirate on the Severn, attacking innocent travellers down the river.

== In Welsh mythology ==
The river is represented in two separate traditions in Welsh mythology, in the most prominent tale, the river is named for Hafren (Old Welsh: Habren, a legendary princess who was drowned by her stepmother Gwendolen.

The Princess appears in Geoffrey of Monmouth's Historia Regum Britanniae when, following the death of the first King of the Britons, Brutus of Troy. The kingdom of Lloegyr is invaded from Germania by Humber the Hun. Humber's invasion is met by forces led by Brutus' eldest son, Locrin. During the struggle, Locrinus uncovers the captive Germanic princess Estrildis in one of Humber's ships and falls in love, despite being betrothed to the daughter of King Corineus of Cornwall, Gwendolen in a forced diplomatic marriage. Locrin eventually defeats the invading forces and is declared the new king of Lloegyr, he also honours his commitment to Corineus, but continues a secret love affair with Estrildis, for whom he has builds palatial apartments secreted in a cave underground. It is from this affair, that Estrildis gives birth to a most beautiful daughter; Hafren.

After the death of Corineus, Locrin divorces Gwendolen and marries Estrildis, making her his queen and legitimising Princess Hafren. However, Gwendolen returns to Cornwall and raises a huge army of all the forces available to her in Civil War. Eventually, the armies of Gwendolen and Locrin meet in battle near the River Stour where Locrin is killed by a single arrow and Gwendolen is declared Queen in her own right. Finally, the furious Queen orders that both Estrildis and her innocent daughter Habren are to be drowned in the river:

(Gwendolen) ordered Estrildis and her daughter Habren to be thrown into the river now called the Severn, and issued instructions throughout Britain that the river should be named after the girl; she wanted Habren to enjoy immortality since her own husband had been the girl's father. Hence the river is called Habren in British even today, although in the other tongue this has been corrupted to Severn.

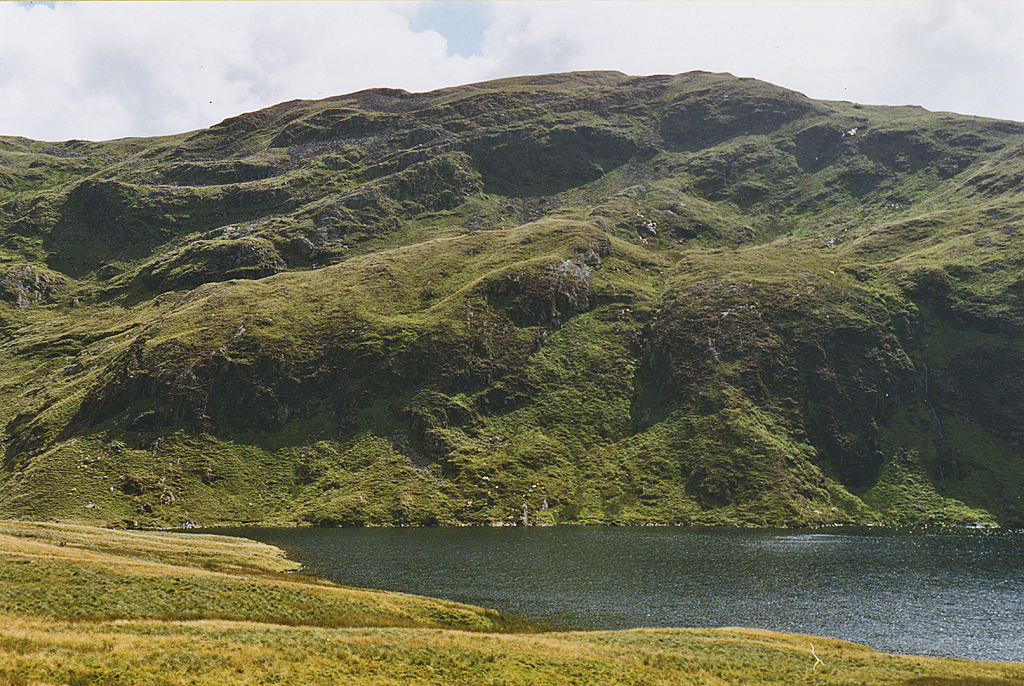
"Father Plynlimon", the mountain from which "the three sisters", Hafren, Gwy and Rheidolyn make their way to the sea

In the second tradition, the river is one of "the three sisters" of Welsh mythology, first recorded by John Rhŷs as a legend told to him in his youth in 1840s Ceredigion. In the legend, "Hafren" and her two sisters, Rheidolyn (the river Rheidol) and Gwy (the river Wye) all rise from "Father Plynlimon" (the mountain upon which the three rivers have their sources), with each sister choosing a different direction to make their way to the sea.

The legend was retold throughout the 19th and 20th centuries, with Arthur Granville Bradley giving a detailed version and analysis in 1920. Bradley states that the god of the mountain was indeed father to three daughters, however in this version each daughter is given a single day to reach the sea, with their father promising all the territory they can cover before dark as a dowery. Hafren awakes first and heads east, taking what is the longest but easiest route to the sea. As such, she reaches the Severn Sea at the day's end and is rewarded with the most fertile country.

== See also ==
- List of crossings of the River Severn
- List of rivers of England and List of rivers of Wales, between them recording all main tributaries
- The Severn Way long-distance footpath
- The Severn Area Rescue Association operates search and rescue services and lifeboats from Wyre Forest to Beachley (4 stations on the river)
- Mercia Inshore Search and Rescue are based at Upton upon Severn
- The Severn Valley, an area straddling Shropshire and Worcestershire
- Severnside, a term with various uses
- Seven Natural Wonders – 2005 TV programme where the river was described as one of the wonders of the West Country.
- Stourport Ring
- South Herefordshire and Over Severn – National Character Area
