= St Philip and St James Church, Up Hatherley =

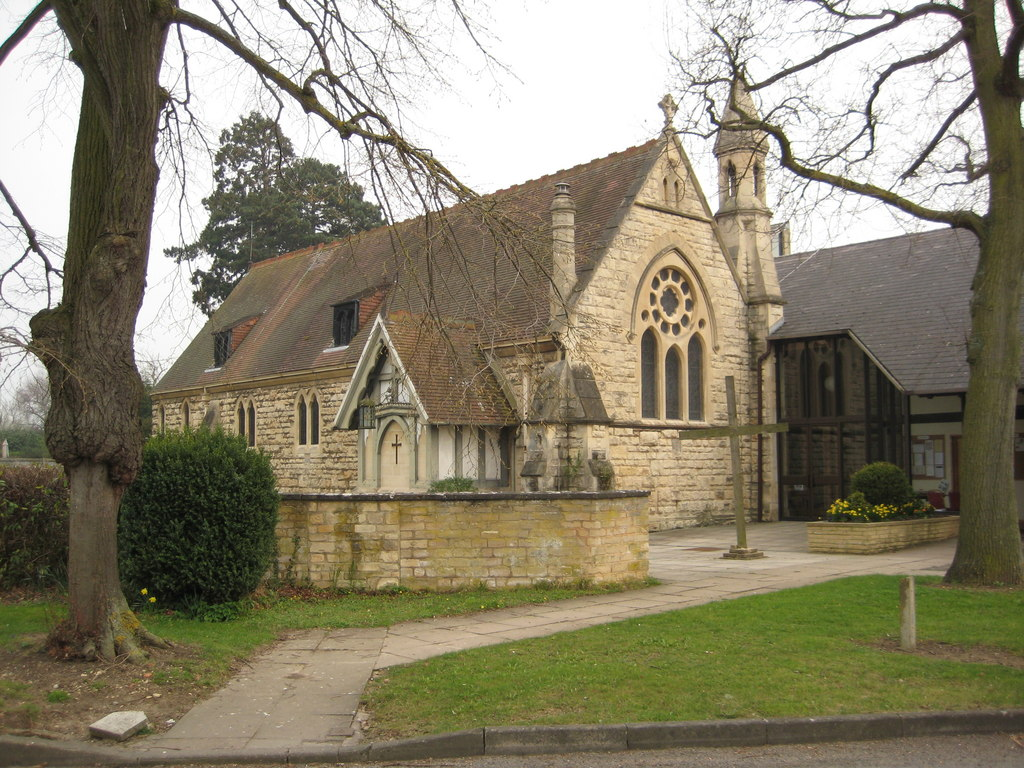
- St Philip and St James Church in 2011
- St Philip and St James Church, Up Hatherley
- 51°53′08″N 2°7′21″W
- OS grid reference: SO 91659 20783
- Location: Cold Pool Lane, Up Hatherley, Cheltenham
- Country: England
- Denomination: Church of England
- Website: www.achurchnearyou.com/church/14268/

History
- Status: Active
- Dedication: Saint Philip, Saint James
- Consecrated: 27 April 1886

Architecture
- Functional status: Parish Church
- Heritage designation: Grade II listed building
- Years built: 1885-86

Administration
- Diocese: Diocese of Gloucester

Clergy
- Vicar: In vacancy

St Philip and St James, Up Hatherley is the Church of England parish church in Up Hatherley, Cheltenham, Gloucestershire, England. The church is part of the Anglican Diocese of Gloucester. The present church is a Grade II listed building and has been a centre for worship since 1886.

== Dedication ==
The church is dedicated to the Apostles St Philip and St James. Their feast day is 1 May.

== History ==
Up Hatherley has been a site of Christian worship since Saxon times, with a documented deed from 1022 that was witnessed by the Bishop of Worcester and the Archbishop of York. The year 1291, as recorded in Pope Nicholas IV's taxation records, further attests to the presence of a church building in Up Hatherley. Unfortunately, in 1640, the church faced destruction by fire, compelling the local community to seek worship in Shurdington for an extended period.

The foundation stone of the present St Philip and St James Church was laid in 1885, owing to the benevolence of Mrs Laura Gretton, who covered the entire cost of construction. The Reverend W. H. Gretton, her husband, had provided the land for this new structure. Originally conceived as a private chapel near Mrs Gretton's residence due to her declining health, overwhelming requests from Up Hatherley residents prompted her to decide on a separate church.

Consecrated on Easter Tuesday in 1886 by the Bishop of Gloucester, the original church followed a thirteenth-century Gothic style, accommodating around 150 worshippers. Designed by Messrs J. H. Middleton, H. A. Prothero, and G. H. Philpot, the church utilized local stone. An organ, crafted by Cheltenham resident Mr A. J. Price, was installed in 1900.

In 1985, responding to the area's population growth, a significant extension project commenced. Consecrated by the Bishop of Gloucester on Saturday 21 September 1985, the new extension involved the removal of the south nave wall, the addition of a large bay, and a reorientation of the seating to a north–south axis. The capacity of the church was expanded to approximately 180 worshippers, and a Church Centre was integrated to provide additional facilities for both the church and the local community.

To ensure aesthetic harmony with the original design, Mr Ron Sims, an ecclesiastical architect from York, spearheaded the interior reordering. This included the installation of a soundproof screen and staircase to an upper meeting room.

== Vicars of the Parish ==
- E. L. Jennings 1885 – 1890
- William Henry Cotes 1890 – 1915
- Richard Williams 1915 – 1925
- Charles William Peach 1925 – 1944
- W. H. Walsham How 1945 – 1947
- Howard Porter 1947 – 1959
- Cecil William Smith 1959 – 1980
- John Heidt 1980 – 1996
- K. Martin Wray 1997 – 2004
- Roger Raven 2005 – 2009
- Richard Dunstan-Meadows 2010 – 2018
- Mark L. Catherall 2019 – 2026
