= List of King George V Playing Fields in Gloucestershire =

Gloucestershire
Location	Formal name	Local name (if any)	National Grid Reference	Dates		External links
Location	Formal name	Local name (if any)	National Grid Reference	Purchase	Opening	External links
Cheltenham	King George V Playing Fields		SO927227			Cheltenham Borough Council List of Parks and Playing Fields
Downend	King George V Playing Field		ST654773			Avon Youth League Handbook 2004/5
Gloucester	King George V Playing Field		SO866172			
Shurdington	King George V Playground	n/a	SO922187	1948	1951	History of Shurdington's field
Tewkesbury	King George’s Field	The Vineyards	SO891322	1938	1938	Borough Council report re charity registration
