= Rad Brook =

Stream in Shropshire, England

Rad Brook Bow Brook
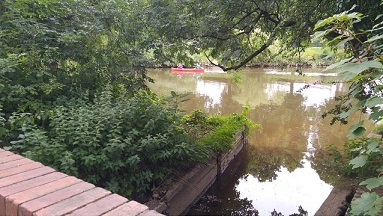
- The Rad Brook joins the River Severn at Burrs Field, Shrewsbury

Location
- Country: England
- Counties: Shropshire

Physical characteristics
- Mouth: Confluence with River Severn
  - location: Shrewsbury, Shropshire
  - coordinates: 52.7030°N 2.7570°W
  - elevation: 48 m (157 ft)

The Rad Brook is a stream in Shropshire, England. It flows through Shrewsbury and enters the River Severn there. It is also known as the Bow Brook. This has given rise to the names Radbrook and Bowbrook, which are adjacent suburban areas of the town. Sometimes the name is claimed to change from the Bow Brook to the Rad Brook downstream of Bow Bridge on the B4386 Mytton Oak Road. The headwaters are around Sascott, south of Ford.
