= Shrewsbury floods =

Sporadic flooding of the River Severn in England

The town of Shrewsbury in Shropshire, England has historically been affected by flooding of the River Severn. The Frankwell area, has been particularly affected, but flood defence measures have largely been effective in the area.

== Geography ==
Shrewsbury is about 14 miles (23 km) west of Telford, 43 miles (69 km) west of Birmingham and the West Midlands Conurbation, and about 153 miles (246 km) northwest of the capital, London. More locally, the town is to the east of Welshpool, with Bridgnorth and Kidderminster to the southeast. The town centre is partially built on a hill whose elevation is, at its highest, 246 feet (75 m) above sea level. The longest river in the UK, the River Severn, flows through the town, forming a meander around its centre. The town is subject to flooding from the river.

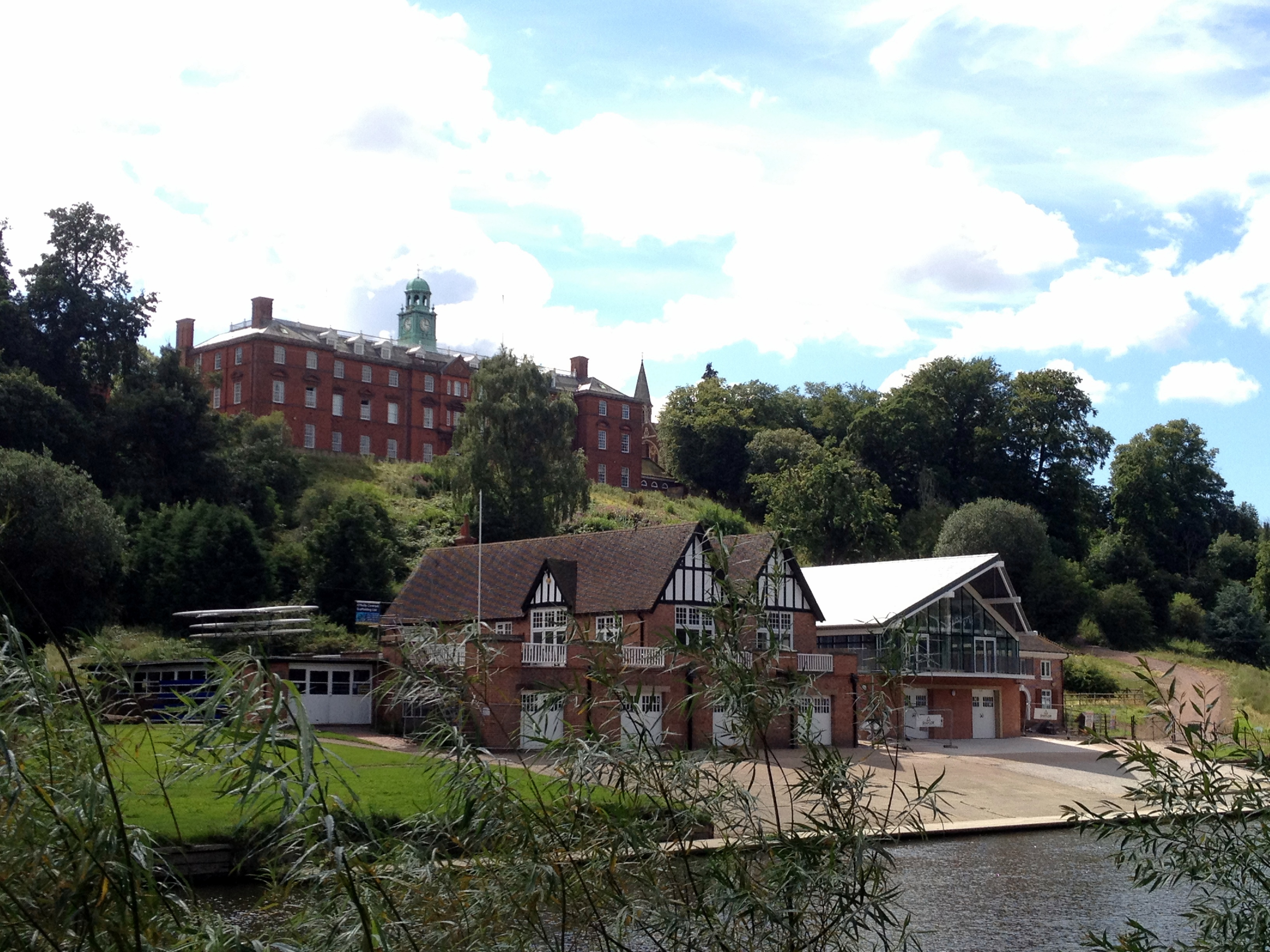
Shrewsbury School, with its boathouse on the River Severn in the foreground.

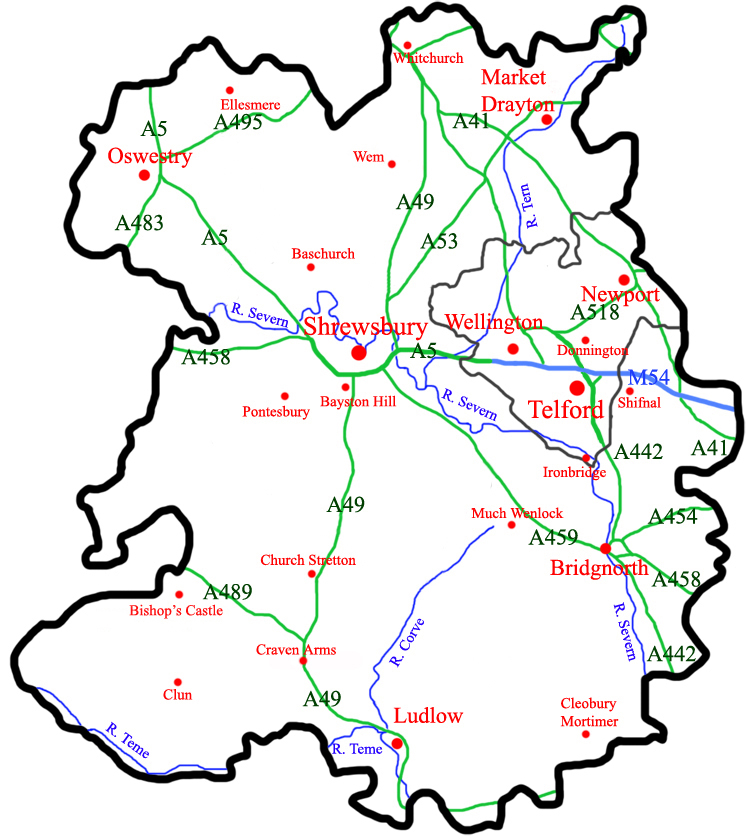

== Defences ==
Most of the ceremonial county of Shropshire is covered for purposes of local government by Shropshire Council, a unitary authority established in 2009. Telford and Wrekin is a unitary authority, with borough status, which forms part of the county for various functions such as Lord Lieutenant but is a separate local authority from Shropshire Council. However many services are shared across both authorities, such as the fire and rescue service, and the two authorities co-operate on some projects such as mapping flood risk.

- In 1954, A scale model was built by hydraulic engineer Claude Inglis to model the effects of flood defenses.
- Environment Agency Plans for defences
- The Frankwell flood defences were completed in 2003, along with the new offices of Shrewsbury and Atcham Borough Council.Frankwell Flood Alleviation scheme
- "Slow the Flow"
- The Quarry park is allowed to flood in preference to other real estate.
- Melverley is used as a controlled flood area
- Response to PMQ
- 2008

== Notable occurrences ==
- Coton Hill flooded in 1846.
- December 1848.
- November 1852.
- February 1867.
- February 1941.
- March 1947.
- January 1948.
- February 1950.
- February 2022

From the late 1990s, the town experienced severe flooding problems from the Severn and Rea Brook. In the autumn of 2000 large swathes of the town were underwater, notably Frankwell, which flooded three times in six weeks. The Frankwell flood defences were completed in 2003, along with the new offices of Shrewsbury and Atcham Borough Council. More recently, such as in 2005 and 2007 but not 2020, flooding has been less severe, and the defences have generally held back floodwaters from the town centre areas. However, the town car parks are often left to be flooded in the winter, which reduces trade in the town, most evidenced in the run up to Christmas in 2007.

=== November 2019 ===
On 14 November nine schools in Shropshire were closed because of floods. The Environment Agency issued three flood warnings for the county, two on the River Severn and one on the River Teme. Sections of the A49 and A488 were closed as were a number of minor roads, particularly in the south of the county. On 15 November four schools remained closed.

On 15 November 2019 rail services between Shrewsbury and Welshpool did not run due to flooding.

=== Storm Dennis (February 2020) ===
Properties were flooded in the centre of Shrewsbury as the Severn burst its banks. The Environment Agency described the flooding across parts of the West Midlands as "unprecedented", and warned that excess runoff from the upper reaches of the Severn in Wales meant that the flooding in the lower Severn valley would likely be prolonged for at least three days.

=== Storm Henk (2024) ===
Storm Henk caused major flooding in Shrewsbury.

== See also ==
- List of floods
