= Down Hatherley =

Village in Gloucestershire, England

Coordinates: 51°54′07″N 2°12′19″W

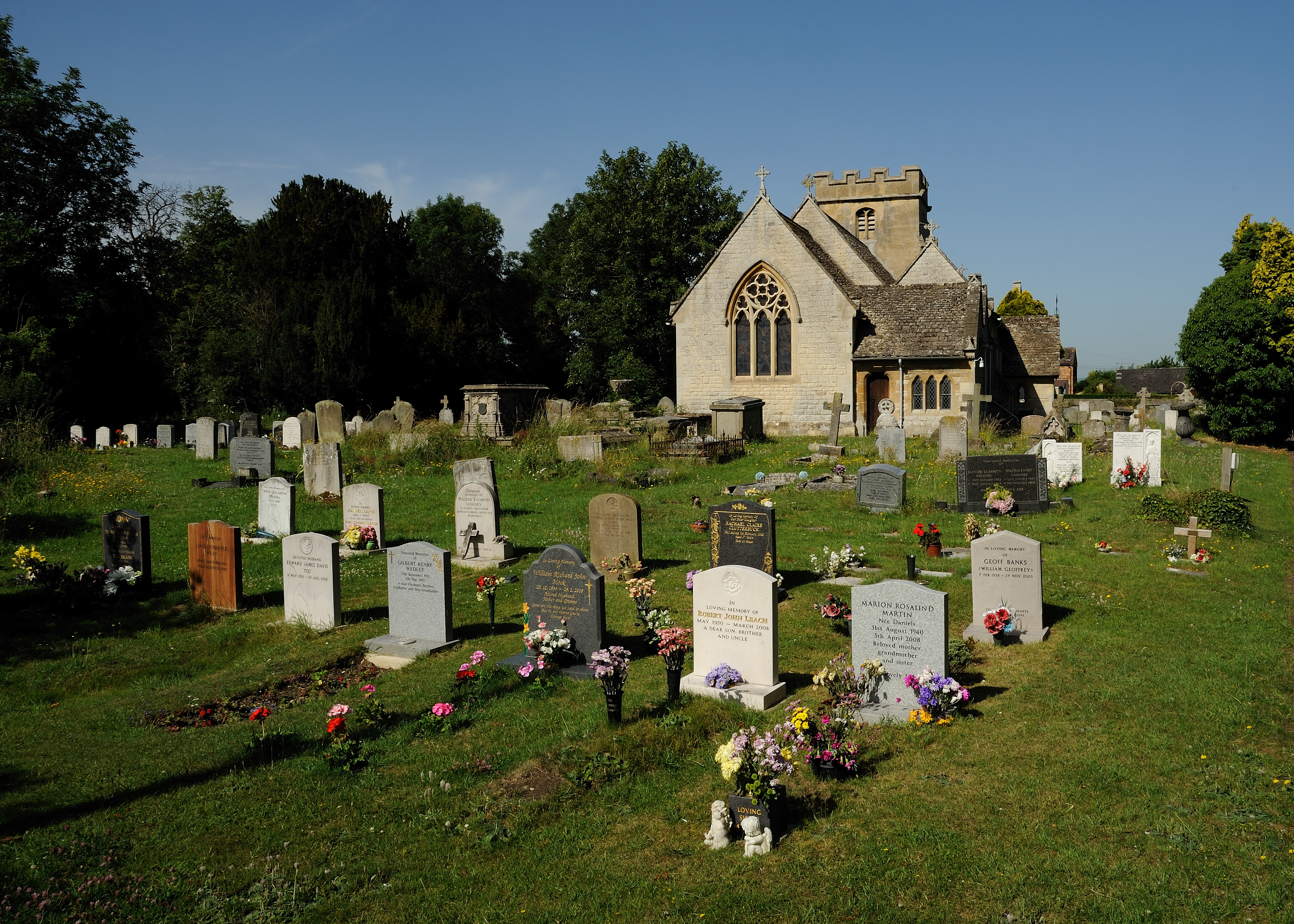
- The Church of St Mary and Corpus Christi

- Location within Gloucestershire
- Population: 419 (2011 Census)
- District: Tewkesbury
- Shire county: Gloucestershire
- Region: South West
- Country: England
- Sovereign state: United Kingdom
- Post town: GLOUCESTER
- Postcode district: GL2
- Police: Gloucestershire
- Fire: Gloucestershire
- Ambulance: South Western
- UK Parliament: Tewkesbury

Down Hatherley is a civil parish and village in the Tewkesbury Borough, between Cheltenham and Gloucester, Gloucestershire. It has approximately 165 houses and a population of 450, reducing to 419 at the 2011 census. The village is situated approximately 3.5 miles (5.6 km) northeast of Gloucester city centre.

The village was recorded (combined with Up Hatherley) as Hegberleo in 1022. It was listed as Athelai in the Domesday Book of 1086. In 1273 it was known as Dunheytherleye and in 1221, Hupheberleg. The name derived from the Old English hagu-thorn + lēah meaning "hawthorn clearing". the distinguishing affixes "Up" and "Down" derived from the Old English upp meaning "higher upstream" and dūne meaning "lower downstream". Up Hatherley is a separate parish three miles upstream on the Hatherley Brook. Historic buildings include St Mary's Church (15th-century tower, otherwise rebuilt 1860) and Hatherley Court (or House) (17th century), now a hotel.

Jemmy Wood, The Gloucester Miser, was a former owner of Hatherley House and estate.

== Notable residents ==
- Button Gwinnett (1735–1777), second of the signatories (first signature on the left) on the United States Declaration of Independence, son of the rector
- Peter Bellinger Brodie (1815–1897), geologist and churchman
- The Page Wood Baronets of Hatherley House
- Sir Matthew Wood, 1st Baronet (1768–1843), Lord Mayor of London
- William Wood, 1st Baron Hatherley (1801–1881), Lord Chancellor, son of last-named, took his peerage title from Down Hatherley
- Sir Frederick Courtenay Selous (1851–1917), explorer, officer, hunter, and conservationist

== References and sources ==
Sources

- Gloucestershire: the Vale and the Forest of Dean, David Verey, Pevsner Architectural Guides: The Buildings of England, Penguin, 1970, ISBN 0-14-071041-8. P.172.
