= Elmbridge, Gloucester =

Suburb of Gloucester, England

Coordinates: 51°52′0″N 2°13′0″W

Elmbridge is a suburb of Gloucester centred 2 miles (3.2 km) from the city centre. The website Elmbridge.link is a resource for local information about the area, including schools, buses, GP surgeries, Post Offices etc.

Extent

It is south of Longlevens and northwest of Barnwood from which it is separated by a thin strip of commercial buildings and the raised, tree-lined Bristol Temple Meads to Birmingham New Street railway. Most of its other borders are arterial, partially built-up roads and it centres on a sub-arterial road, Elmbridge Road and two lesser feeder residential roads.

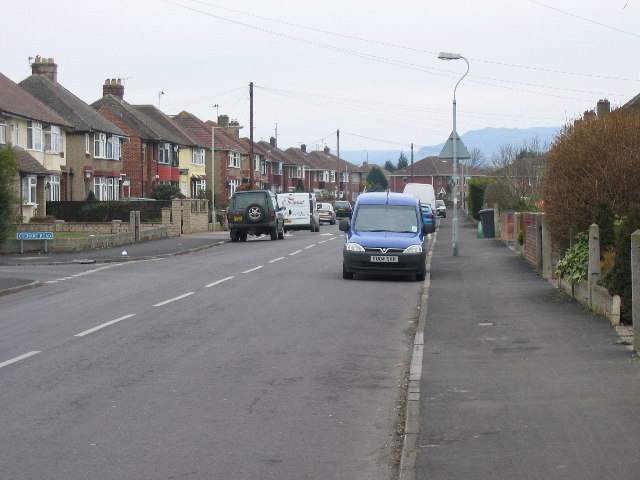
Nine Elms Road in Elmbridge in January 2006

== Amenities ==
It has two schools: Elmbridge Primary School and Sir Thomas Rich's School. It also has a general practice clinic, convenience stores, and three bus services which are run by Stagecoach West. Old Richians Rugby Club was at first limited to alumni from Sir Thomas Rich's Grammar School and competes in a regional league in a city that hosts the nationally and internationally competing main team: Gloucester Rugby. Elmbridge has a local information website.

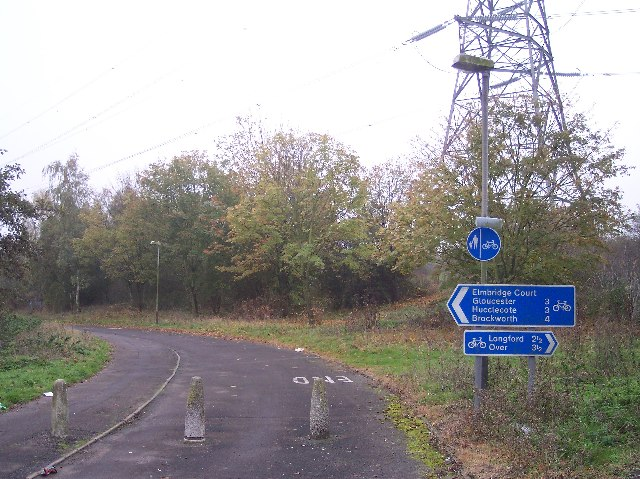
Elmbridge Court Roundabout cycleway is a green-lined and mode-segregated way to the northeast of the suburb and city, undershooting the large road intersection.

== Gloucester City Council ==
Representatives are two elected councillors, up for election every four years. The area in terms of civil parishes in England is no longer "parished", meaning only one council is contributed to (by Council Tax) and serves the area. The ward boundaries are similar to the popular, strong-boundaries definition as currently drawn, and are drawn or reconsidered every eight years so the vote each potential voter of Gloucester has equal power, that is, is properly apportioned.

== History and other names ==
Longlevens took in all but a southern strip of the area, in terms of the historical bounds and today's Church of England parish. However, its name and status before 1932 was an old manor but more officially, was the southern part of Wotton St Mary Without, as it remains in the Church of England called, but which shed its final 865 northern acres to set up another parish, Innsworth in terms of the secular (Civil) and Ecclesiastical separate, sometimes today confused, parish entities.

The southern strip falls in the north-east of the town (before the 11th century possibly single parish of St Owen and separate abbey church and holdings) of Gloucester, but since an early date in the long history of the church of St Catharines, part of that parish which variously pulsated in size. The church, closer to the town centre than Elmbridge, takes in part of 12th century St. Oswald's church, which had been accounted a royal free chapel, had probably provided a place of worship for the people living liberty under the Priory (Abbey) of Gloucester from its beginnings and took the tithes. By the 12th century, chapels had been built in those parts of the liberty outside the town. St. Oswald's parish, as defined in the mid 14th century, comprised the northern suburb next to the priory, Brook Street, the house of the Carmelite friars, and Hyde to the east of the town, and parts of Longford and Twigworth to the north; parts of Kingsholm also in the mid 16th century. The parish and church were renamed St. Catherine after the Dissolution, although the former name was frequently used. The church was served by a curate in 1536 and by a vicar in 1542.

The church of Longlevens being beyond the northern boundary and all housing being post-Georgian, reflects the fields which comprised Elmbridge and which the townsfolk of Gloucester used to work to support their markets, abbey and livelihoods.
