= Shurdington =

Village in Gloucestershire, England

Coordinates: 51°51′58″N 2°07′01″W

- Location within Gloucestershire
- Population: 1,936 (2011)
- District: Tewkesbury
- Shire county: Gloucestershire
- Region: South West
- Country: England
- Sovereign state: United Kingdom
- Post town: CHELTENHAM
- Postcode district: GL51
- Dialling code: 01452
- Police: Gloucestershire
- Fire: Gloucestershire
- Ambulance: South Western
- UK Parliament: North Cotswolds

Shurdington is a village near Cheltenham in Gloucestershire, England. The area constitutes a civil parish within the Borough of Tewkesbury. It is located south of Cheltenham on the A46. The population at the 2011 census was 1,936.

Shurdington has an 11th-century church (St. Paul's), a modern Community Centre (completed 1998) containing the Century Hall, Millennium Hall and Sobey Suite; a Primary School, a post office and general store, a cafe and hairdresser (Beauty and the Teacup). There are two public houses: the Bell Inn and The Cheese Rollers. The latter is named for the annual cheese rolling event which takes place at nearby Cooper's Hill.

== Governance ==
An electoral ward in the same name exists. The area of this ward and the population are identical to that of the parish.

== Sports and recreation ==
Local community organisations include the 15th Cheltenham (Shurdington) Scout Group, the Cricket Club, and a Women's Institute.

Shurdington has one of the 471 King George's Fields as its recreation ground.
