= Longford, Gloucestershire =

Village in Gloucestershire, England

Coordinates: 51.884602°N 2.233508°W

Longford
- Village
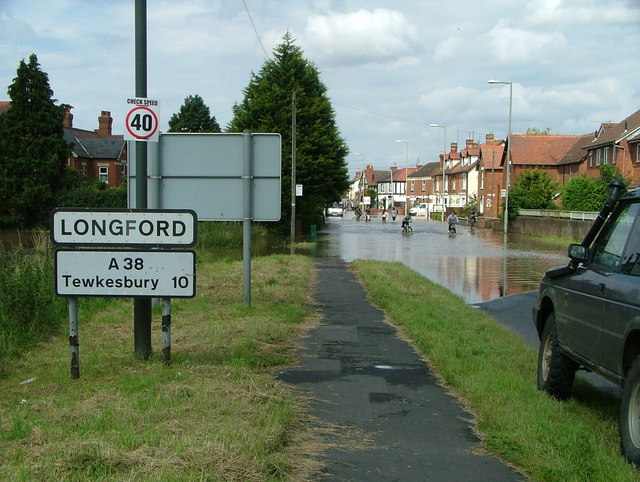
- Longford flooding in 2007

- Location within Gloucestershire
- Population: 1,962 (2021 census)
- OS grid reference: SO839205
  - London: 103m
- Civil parish: Longford
- District: Tewkesbury
- Shire county: Gloucestershire
- Ceremonial county: Gloucestershire
- Region: South West
- Country: England
- Sovereign state: United Kingdom
- Post town: GLOUCESTER
- Postcode district: GL2
- Dialling code: 01452
- Police: Gloucestershire
- Fire: Gloucestershire
- Ambulance: South Western
- UK Parliament: Tewkesbury

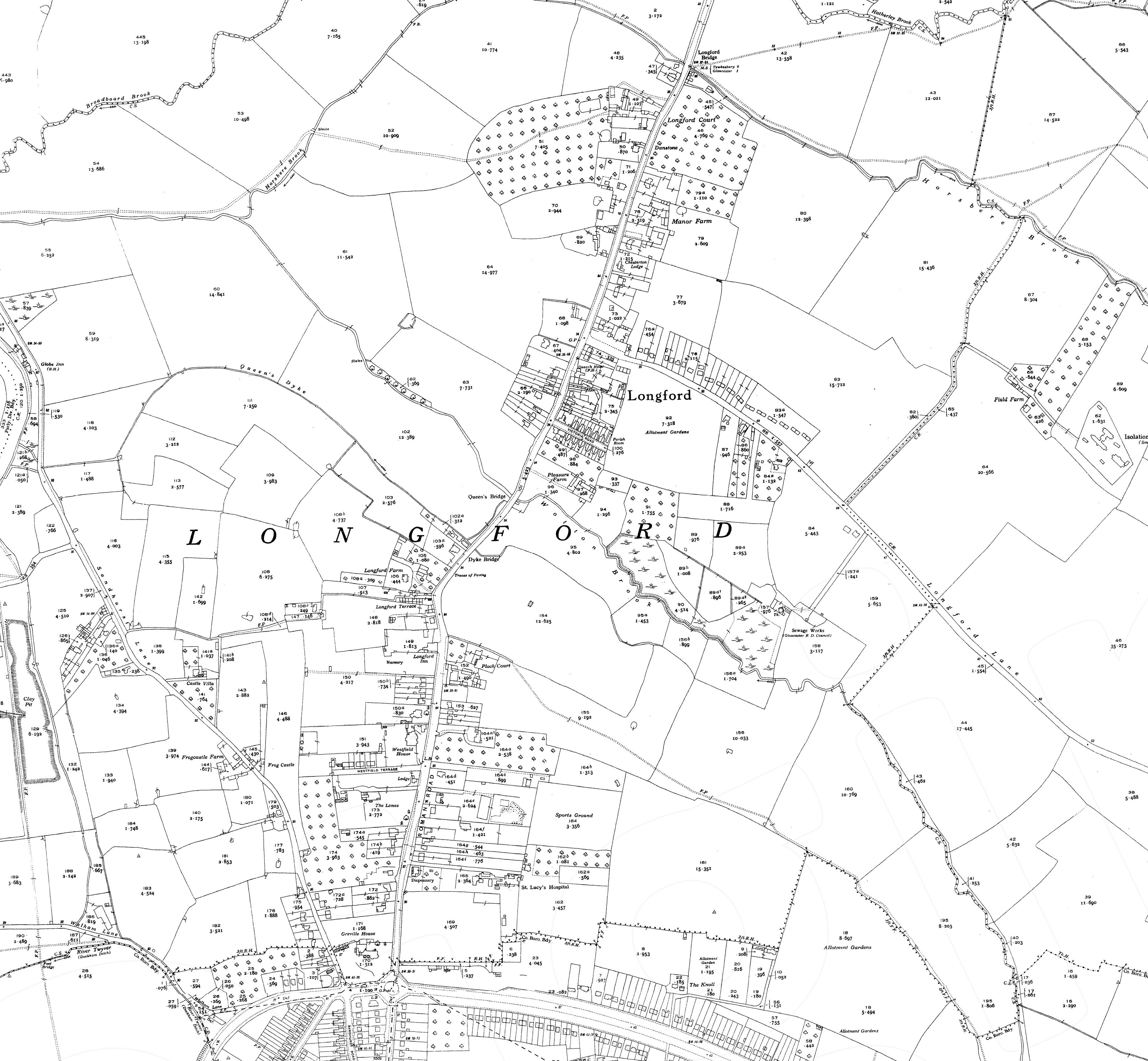
Longford on a 1930s Ordnance Survey map

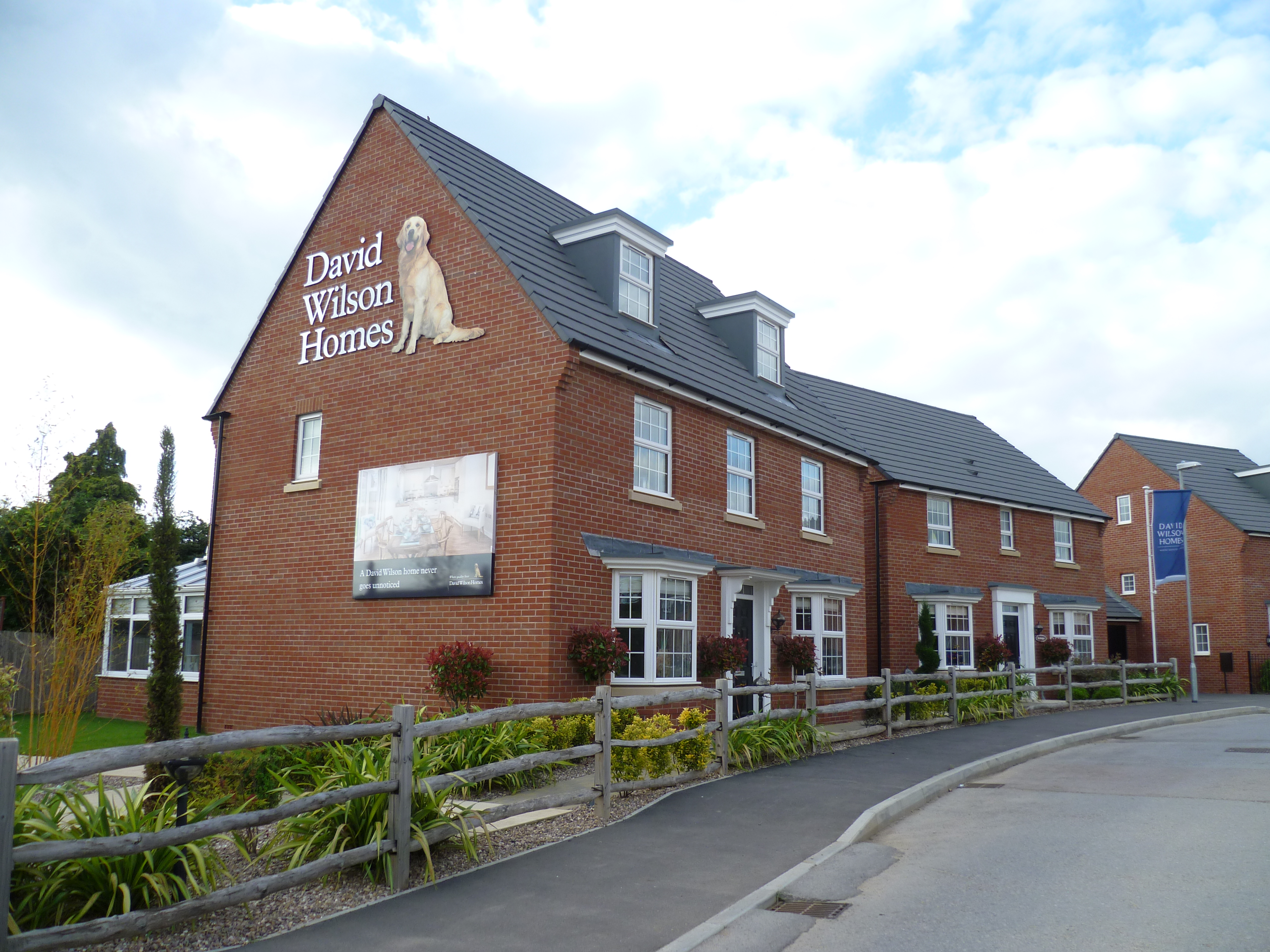
New houses at Whittington Park.

Longford is a village and civil parish in Gloucestershire, England. Although situated within two miles of Gloucester city centre, Longford parish falls within the jurisdiction of the Borough of Tewkesbury.

The village borders the Tewkesbury Road running north out of Gloucester and is bisected by the A40 northern bypass at the busy Longford roundabout. Connected with Segregated Bicycle Path to Gloucester.

Longford is primarily residential; it is home to Oxstalls Sports Park and Tennis Centre, the Winfield Hospital, and both Longford AFC and Gala Wilton Football Clubs.

== Etymology ==
Tewkesbury Road ran northwards from Gloucester, passing through Alvin Gate and the settlements of Kingsholm, Longford, and Twigworth. In Kingsholm, it was joined by a road from Blind Gate, which was known in its southern part as Dean’s Walk in 1803 and in its northern part as Snake Lane in 1722 (later renamed Edwy Parade). In Longford, the road was carried over watercourses and low-lying meadows by bridges and a causeway. The name Longford itself derived from this crossing.

== History ==
By the early 13th century, there was evidence of habitation in Longford. A man surnamed "of the Plock" was recorded at that time, and Plock Court, situated east of the road, occupied the site of a medieval manor house. A small early settlement had developed at the southern end of the causeway, where a medieval cross and possibly a chapel once stood. Further north, in the early 19th century, a house along the Tewkesbury Road just beyond Kingsholm was converted into three cottages.

Longford village lies approximately 2 km north-northeast of Gloucester Cross, along the causeway that carries the road between the Wotton and Horsbere brooks. It is likely that most of the 18 residents assessed for the subsidy in Longford in 1327, as well as the 26 houses assessed for hearth tax in 1672, were located in this area.

During the late 18th century, Longford had several farmhouses and other substantial residences. R. B. Cheston, a Gloucester surgeon and aspiring landowner, built his residence there, contributing to improvements in both the road and the village’s appearance. In the north of the village, Manor Farm includes a timber-framed farmhouse with an early 18th-century brick wing. Longford Court was rebuilt in the late 18th century on the site of the Olive family’s farmhouse, which had previously been an inn. Longford Lodge, also dating from the 18th century, became the centre of an estate inherited by the Hyett family from the Webbs.

In the south of the village, Pleasure Farm was an early 18th-century brick farmhouse that belonged to Anthony Ellis in 1799. It was later used as a lorry depot before being demolished in 1983 to make way for a housing estate. By 1801, the combined parishes of Longford St Catherine and Longford St Mary had 36 houses and a population of 166. Many of Longford’s buildings date from the 19th century, including the Queen’s Head Inn, which was in operation by 1851. In the 20th century, the village underwent significant change, with the construction of housing for people working in Gloucester, which altered its appearance considerably.

Extract from Lewis's Topographical Dictionary of England, 1831:

LONGFORD, a hamlet in those parts of the parishes of ST-CATHERINE, and ST-MARY-de-LODE-GLOUCESTER, which are in the upper division of the hundred of DUDSTONE-and-KING'S-BARTON, county of GLOUCESTER, 1 mile (N.E. by N.) from Gloucester, containing 215 inhabitants.

In 1851 market gardeners were fairly numerous in Longford and Twigworth, and later there were several market gardens and nurseries at Longlevens (called Springfield) and Innsworth. In 1855 the civil parish of Longford was created.

In 1870-72, John Marius Wilson's Imperial Gazetteer of England and Wales described Longford like this:

LONGFORD-ST.CATHERINE, a hamlet in St. Catherine parish, Gloucestershire; contiguous to Gloucester city, 1 mile N of Gloucester r. station. Acres, 200. Real property, with Longford-St. Mary, £4,735. Pop.. 213. Houses, 37. The manor belongs to the Bishop of Gloucester; and most of the land, to the Dean and Chapter. A Roman settlement is supposed to have been here.

In 1866, a free hospital for the children of the poor was established next to St Lucy’s Home of Charity, on the site of what is now Gambier Parry Gardens. The home, a converted villa east of the Tewkesbury Road, was occupied by the Sisters of St Lucy, an Anglican community founded in 1864 by Thomas Gambier Parry of Highnam. The sisters were trained to nurse the sick in their homes and were sent to various parts of the country. By 1866, some patients were also being cared for within the home itself.

Gambier Parry conceived the idea of the children's hospital in connection with the home and covered much of the building costs. Designed by William Jacques, the hospital was a brick building that opened in 1867 with 22 beds. It admitted poor children from any location, while outpatients were treated at a separate house in Bell Lane. The hospital was funded through subscriptions and donations. In 1872, the Sisters of St John the Baptist from Clewer, Berkshire, took over the work previously carried out by the Sisters of St Lucy. In 1876, Gambier Parry relocated the home to a large house at the corner of Hare Lane and Pitt Street.

The Gloucester Farmers’ Club, founded in 1840, now meets at Agriculture House in Greville Close. This building was formerly Greville House, a substantial family home constructed in the 1860s.

In 1927, Mary Fluck vacated her residence at The Limes (next to Westfield Terrace) so that it could be used as a convalescent home. In 1940, it temporarily served as a maternity hospital while Gloucester Maternity Hospital was under construction. By the mid-1940s, it had been repurposed as a children’s home.

== Notable residents ==
- Society photographer Dorothy Wilding was born in Longford in 1893.

== Education ==
Longford Park Primary Academy, a new primary school and nursery with 210 places, opened at Whittington Park, Longford, in September 2017 near the Longford Village Hall.

From 2017 to 2022, the University of Gloucestershire made significant improvements to Plock Court as part of its Oxstalls Campus redevelopment. The improvements comprised a new business school and growth hub together with substantial sports facilities: a sports hall, 4G pitches, landscaping, and better community access.

== Sport and entertainment ==
Every summer from 2013 to 2017, Oxstalls Sport Park, Plock Court was the venue for the Sportbeat Music Festival, a two day outdoor music and sports festival.

Sports activities include:

- Oxstalls Tennis Centre, Oxstalls Sports Park, with 6 indoor and 4 outdoor tennis courts (now run by Freedom Leisure).
- Gala Wilton Football Club
- Longford A.F.C.

From 1981-83, Fairmile House in Fairmile Gardens was used as one of the filming locations for two series of the BBC2 TV sitcom The Last Song (TV series) starring Geoffrey Palmer (actor).

== Flooding ==
Longford was severely affected by the July 2007 floods resulting in the many homes being flooded. The bar at the Queen's Head on the Tewkesbury Road was under a couple of feet of water.

== Politics ==
Longford is governed by a civil parish council. The council appoints one councillor who is then known as the Chairman or Chairwoman. The current Chairperson is Councillor Christina Young.

| Group affiliation | Members |
|---|---|
| Independent | 5 |
| Conservative | 1 |
| Reform UK | 1 |
| Total | 7 |

== Transport ==
The A38 runs through the center of Longford. Towards the south of the village, the A38 leads to a roundabout, leading to the A40, and Gloucester.
