= Rushbearing =

English ecclesiastical festival

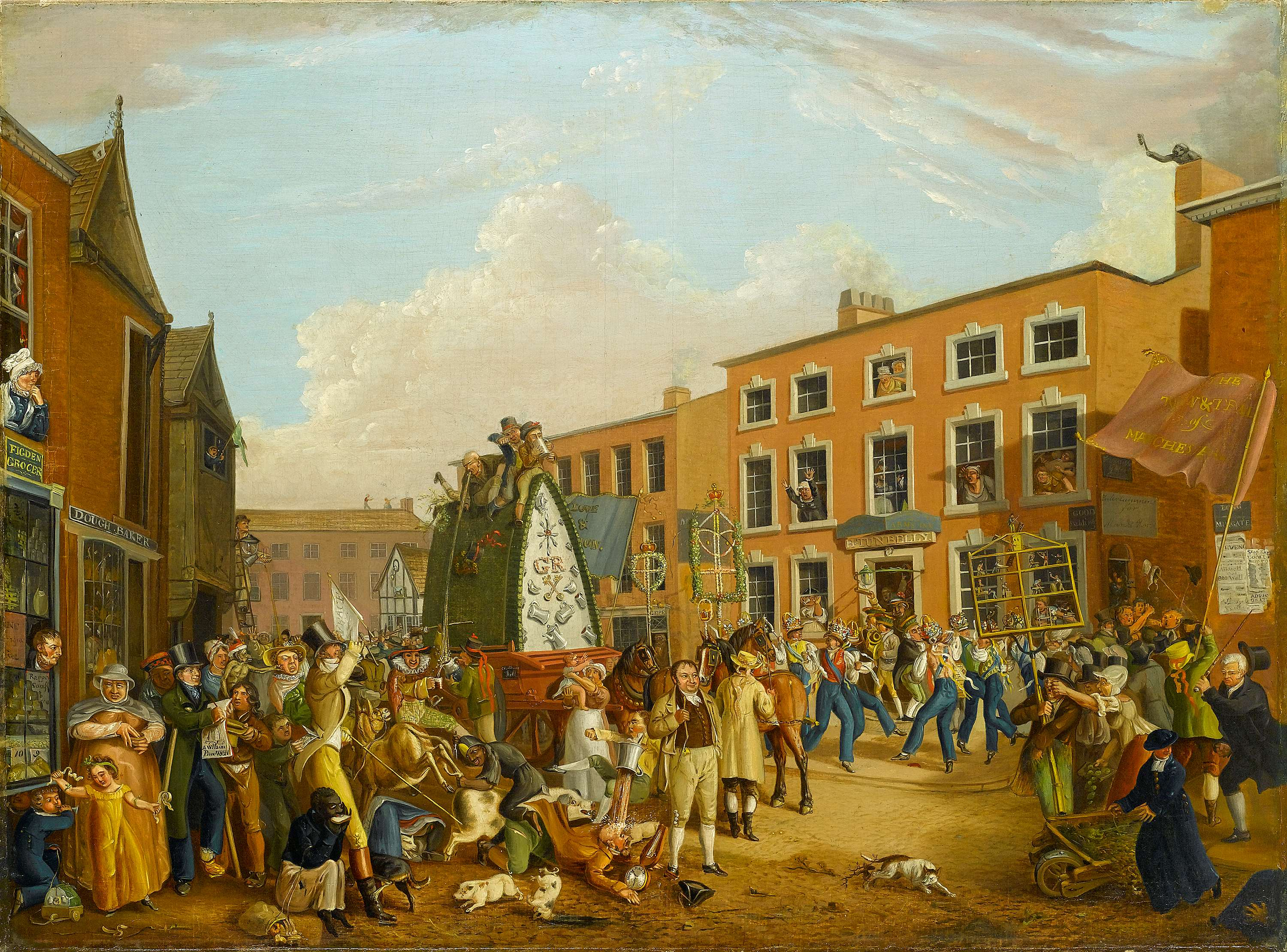
A rushbearing procession at Long Millgate, Manchester painted by Alexander Wilson, 1821

Rushbearing is an old English ecclesiastical festival in which rushes are collected and carried to be strewn on the floor of the parish church. The tradition dates back to the time when most buildings had earthen floors and rushes were used as a form of renewable floor covering for cleanliness and insulation. (Note: Common club-rush or Bulrush.Schoenoplectus lacustris ( Richard Mabey ). . . " Club-rush is one of the species that gave the ceremony of rush-bearing its title.. . .Before the days of floor boarding and carpets, the stone or earth floors of churches . . .were strewn with a mixture of rushes, sweet-flags and scented herbs. . .this green carpet had to be renewed at least once a year ". . .) The festival was widespread in Britain from the Middle Ages and well established by the time of Shakespeare, but had fallen into decline by the beginning of the 19th century, as church floors were flagged with stone. The custom was revived later in the 19th century, and is kept alive today as an annual event in a number of towns and villages in Northern England.

== Early history ==
In AD 601 Pope Gregory I wrote a letter to Mellitus (a member of the Gregorian mission sent to England to convert the Anglo-Saxons from their native paganism to Christianity) which read:

When, therefore, Almighty God shall bring you to the most reverend man our brother bishop, St Augustine, tell him what I have, upon mature deliberation on the affair of the English, thought of; namely, that the temples of the idols in that nation ought not to be destroyed. Let holy water be made, and sprinkled in the said temples; let altars be erected, and let relics be deposited in them. For since those temples are built, it is requisite that they be converted from the worship of the devils to the service of the true God; that the nation, not seeing those temples destroyed, may remove error from their hearts, and knowing and adoring the true God, may the more familiarly resort to the same places to which they have been accustomed. And because they are wont to sacrifice many oxen in honour of the devils, let them celebrate a religious and solemn festival, not slaughtering the beasts for devils, but to be consumed by themselves, to the praise of God...

Every church at its consecration was given the name of a patron saint and either the day of its consecration or the saint's feast day became the church's festival. Church services began at sunset on Saturday and the night of prayer was called a vigil, eve or, due to the late hour, wake, from the Old English waecan. Each village had a wake with quasi-religious celebrations followed by church services then sports, games, dancing and drinking.

During the Middle Ages the floors of most churches and dwellings consisted of compacted earth, and rushes (commonly "sweet flag" Acorus calamus) or other herbs and grasses were strewn over them to provide a sweet smelling, renewable covering for insulation. The Household roll of Edward II (1307–1327) shows a payment to a John de Carlford for "a supply of rushes for strewing the King’s chamber". In the Churchwardens' accounts for St Mary-at-Hill in the City of London, payments of 3d for rushes are shown for 1493 and 1504, and in the parish register of the church at Kirkham, Lancashire, disbursements for rushes are found in 1604 and 1631 for 9s 6d, but not after 1634 when the church floor was flagged. At Saddleworth (then in Yorkshire) the church floor was covered with rushes until 1826.

The churches allocated a particular day in the calendar for the rushbearing and, by the 16th century, it was customary to ring the church bells and provide wine, ale and cakes for the rushbearers. Some festivals were more elaborate with mimetic and representational elements. An account from Cawthorne in Yorkshire from 1596 said that the people "did arm and disguyse themselves some of them putting on womens aparrell, other some of them putting on longe haire & visardes, and others arminge them with the furnyture of souldiers, and being there thus armed and disguysed did that day goe from the Churche, and so went up and downe the towne showinge themselves".

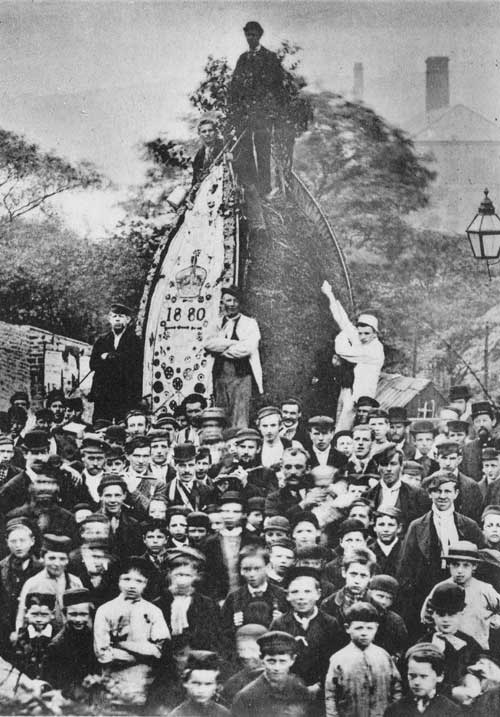
Uppermill rushbearing in 1880

The festival often attracted unsavoury characters, such as pedlars, cutpurses and pickpockets, and became a pretext for heavy drinking in otherwise quiet communities, such that even pillars of the community would occasionally disgrace themselves:

Tristram Tyldedesly, the minister at Rufford and Marsden on Sundays and hollidaies hath danced emongst light and youthful companie both men and women at weddings, drynkings and rishbearings; and in his dancing and after wantonlye and dissolutely he kissed a mayd...whereat divers persons were offended and so sore grieved that there was weapons drawn and great dissenssion arose.

Puritan magistrates and ministers opposed Sunday rushbearing, probably because of the intemperance and indecorum which attended the occasion. Consequently, when James I issued the Declaration of Sports in 1617, which listed the forms of recreation permitted on Sundays and Holy days, rushbearing was listed, along with other pursuits, such as archery, Whitsun Ales, Morris dancing and the setting up of Maypoles. Indeed, when James I visited Sir Richard Hoghton in Lancashire in 1617, the first entertainment offered was a rushbearing.

In the 18th century the ceremony usually formed part of the annual feast or wake, held on the Sunday closest to the feast day of the saint to which the church was dedicated. The rushes were brought to the church in a procession, accompanied by music and Morris dancing. In some areas the rushes were carried in individual bundles and in others on a rushcart. Where a rushcart was used it became the main focus and was decorated with garlands and flowers, tinsel, and 'all the silver plate that can be borrowed in the neighbourhood'. When the procession reached the parish church the rushes were strewn on the floor and the garlands used to adorn the church. It is not known how long rushcarts have been a feature of the festivities, but an account by the Hon. H. Egerton from 1726 implies that the one he saw in use in Prestwich was of long standing.

By the early 19th century the tradition had died out in many parts of the country, but it evolved and survived in industrial parts of Lancashire.

== Regional history ==
=== Derbyshire ===
==== Chapel-en-le-Frith ====
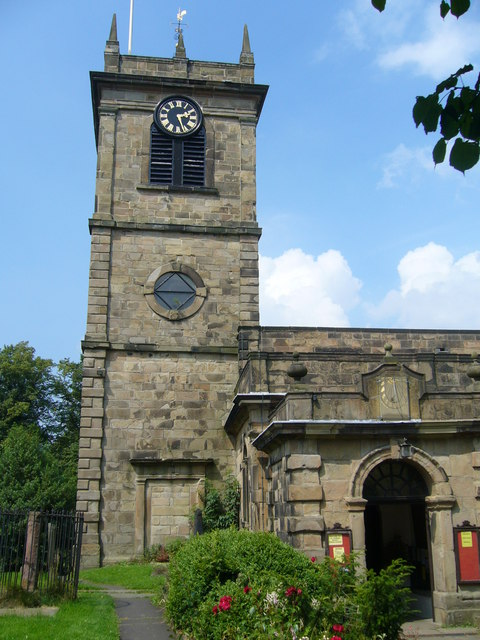
Church of Thomas Becket, Chapel-en-le-Frith

The History of the county of Derby (1829) gives descriptions of the rushbearings at Chapel-en-le-Frith:

It usually takes place at the latter end of August, on public notice from the churchwardens, of the rushes being mown and properly dried, in some marshy part of the parish, where the young people assemble: the carts are loaded with rushes and with flowers and ribands; and are attended to the church by the populous, many huzzaing and cracking whips by the side of the rush-cart, on their way thither, where everyone lends a hand in carrying in and spreading the rushes. At Whitwell, instead of rushes, the hay of a piece of grass-land called the church close, is annually, on Midsummer eve, carted and spread in the church.

==== Glossop ====
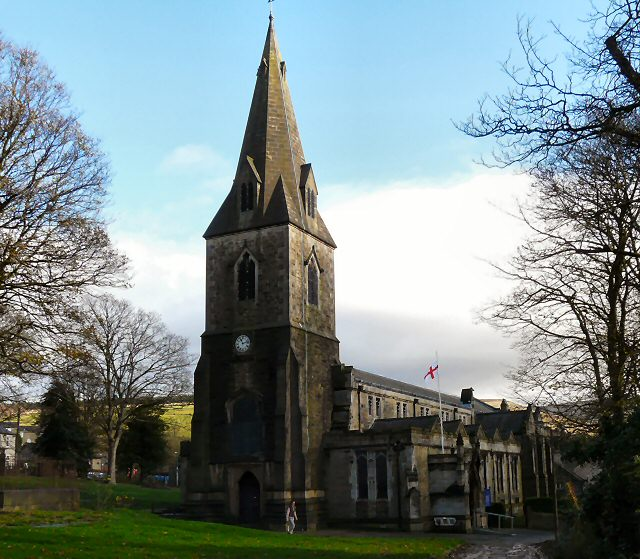
All Saints' Church, Glossop

Previously to our leaving Glossop we visited the village church...Here we observed the remains of some garlands hung up near to the entrance into the chancel. They were mementos of a custom of a rather singular nature, that lingers about this part of Derbyshire, after having been lost in nearly every other. It is denominated rush-bearing; and the ceremonies of this truly rural fête take place annually, on one of the days appropriated to the wake or village festival. A car or wagon is on this occasion decorated with rushes. A pyramid of rushes, ornamented with wreaths of flowers, and surmounted with a garland, occupies the centre of the car, which is usually bestrewed with the choicest flowers that the meadows of Glossop Dale can produce, and liberally furnished with flags and streamers. Thus prepared, it is drawn through the different parts of the village, preceded by groups of dancers and a band of music. All the ribands in the place may be said to be in requisition on this festive day, and he who is the greatest favourite amongst the lasses is generally the gayest personage in the cavalcade. After parading the village, the car stops at the church gates, where it is dismantled of its honours. The rushes and flowers are then taken into the church and strewed amongst the pews and along the floors, and the garlands are hung up near the entrance into the chancel, in remembrance of the day. The ceremony being ended, the various parties who made up the procession retire, amidst music and dancing, to the village inn, where they spend the remainder of the day in joyous festivity.

=== Cumbria ===
In Cumbria, the ceremony was revived in Warcop and Musgrave at the wish of Septimus Collinson, Provost of Queen's College, Oxford and a native of the village, after being extinct for about thirty years, but an attempt to revive it at Great Langdale proved unsuccessful.

==== Grasmere ====
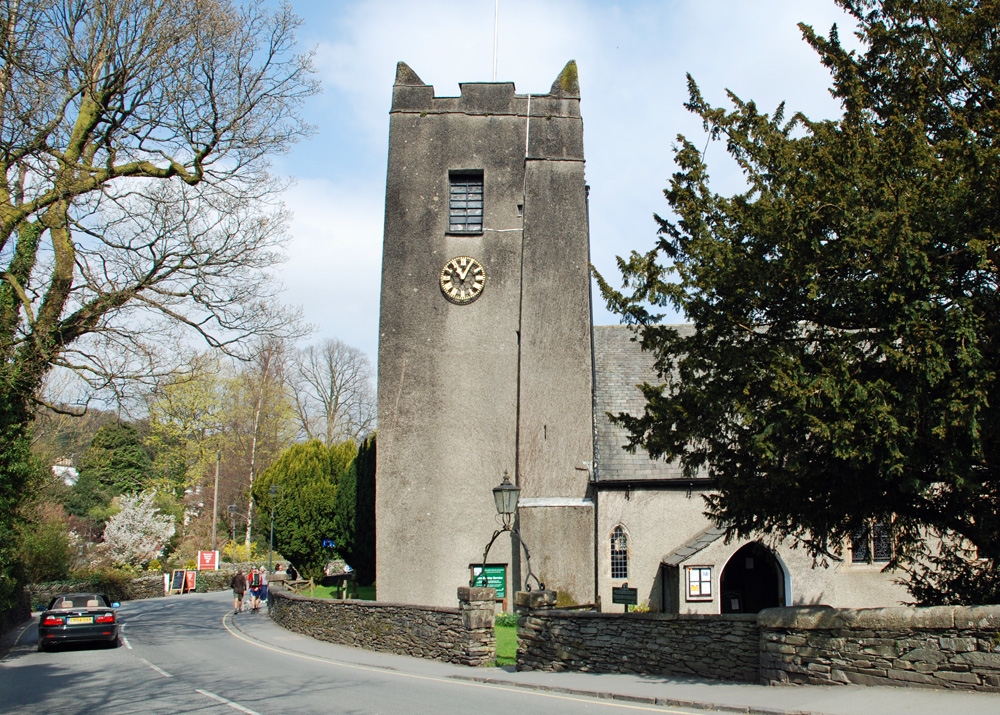
St Oswald's Church, Grasmere

At Grasmere the rushbearing took a different form. In Clarke's Survey of the Lakes (1770) the bearers were said to be women and girls but by 1887, when the romantic poet William Wordsworth became involved, the rushbearings were described as "tall poles decked with rushes and flowers" carried by boys and girls up to the age of fifteen.

Rural Ceremony
Closing the sacred Book which long has fed
Our meditations, give we to a day
Of annual joy one tributary lay;
This day, when, forth by rustic music led,
The village Children, while the sky is red
With evening lights, advance in long array
Through the still churchyard, each with garland gay,
That, carried sceptre-like, o'ertops the head
Of the proud Bearer. To the wide church-door,
Charged with these offerings which their fathers bore
For decoration in the Papal time,
The innocent procession softly moves:--
The spirit of Laud is pleased in heaven's pure clime,
And Hooker's voice the spectacle approves! – William Wordsworth

The Grasmere Rushbearing still takes place annually on the second Saturday of July, one week after the rushbearing in Ambleside. Children receive free ice cream and a medal for participating.

==== Ambleside ====
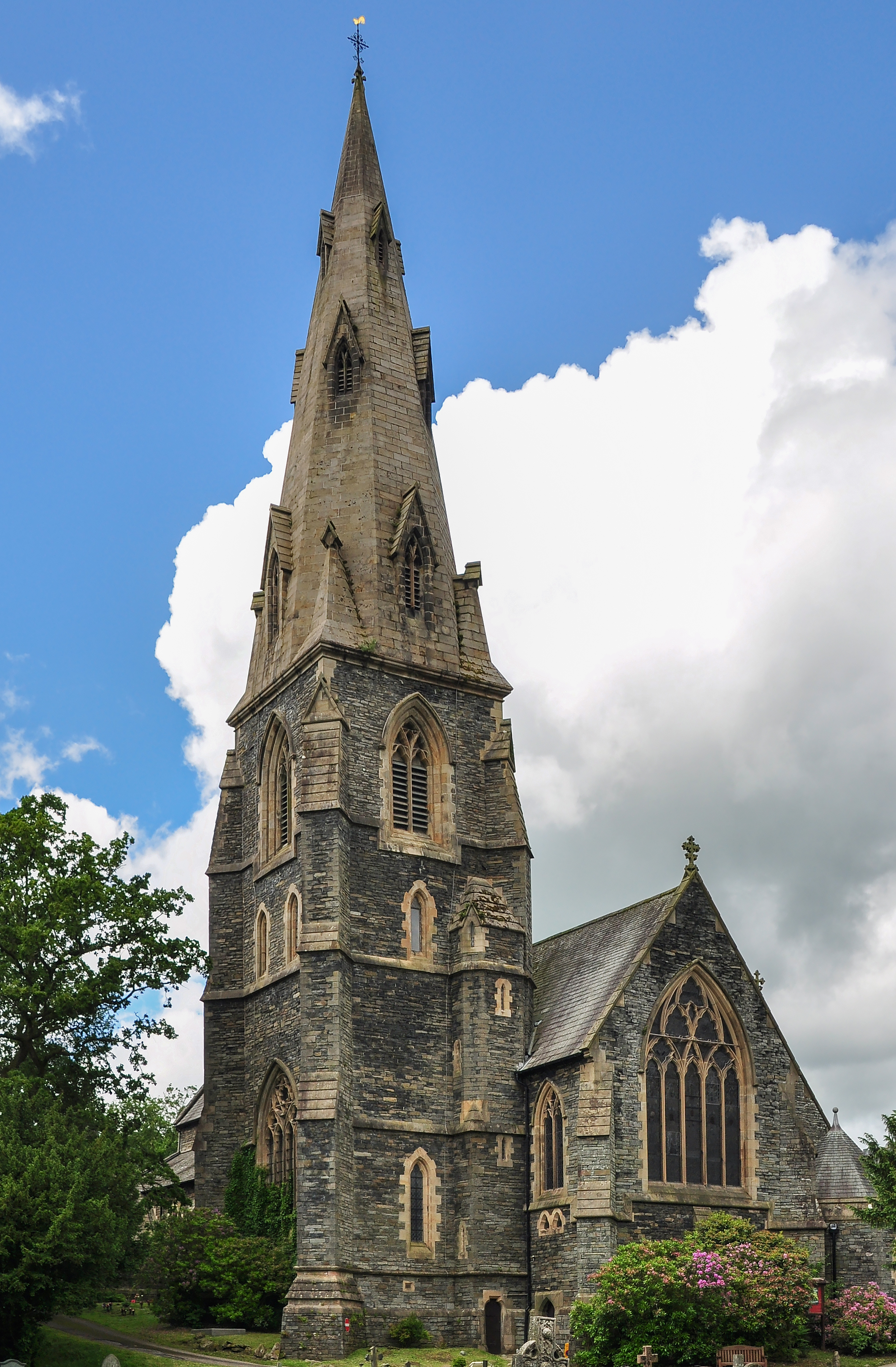
St Mary's Church, Ambleside. The church was built in the 1850s.

Before the 17th century the nearest church to Ambleside was St Martin's Church at Bowness-on-Windermere. St Mary's Church was built in the 1850s. (Note: See Ambleside > St Mary's Church)

. . . " The following extracts are taken from an interview in 1898 between Canon H. D. Rawnsley, Vicar of Crosthwaite (Note: See St Kentigern's Church, Crosthwaite > Vicars) near Keswick, and Miss H. Nicholson, then aged eighty-five:

. . . " In my young days we met at the Village Cross on the Saturday nearest St.Anne's Day at six o'clock in the evening. Old Tommy Haughton the clogger came; he was a very clever jigger, best dancer hereabout . . .he was a kind of clerk and village constable who marshalled us . . .everyone who chose came – young and old; and all who carried "burdens" ( garlands-on-poles ) received a good big cake of gingerbread, made by Old Mickey the baker . . .Folk came for miles to see the procession, and Wordsworth never missed; he and the Rydale party would sit in our little room to see the procession start . . .we all met – a hundred or more – and then an old man played on his fiddle or his pipe and off we all went around the village; up street and down street, to the same old tune. We only knew one tune in those days – " The Hunt is Up ". We became refined in later days, and then we had a band – the Steamer Band ( from the Windermere steamer (Note: See Windermere Lake Cruises > History) ) and my mother, who collected for the gingerbread, had to collect an additional sovereign for the band.

This is an extract of a poem by the English poet Letitia Elizabeth Landon ( L.E.L. ):

. . .The green rush, the green rush, we bear it along,
To the church of our village with triumph and song,
We strew the cold chancel and kneel on it there,
While its fresh odours rise with our voices in prayer.
Hark the peal from the old tower in praise of it rings,
Let us seek the green rush by the green woodland springs.
– Letitia Elizabeth Landon

=== Bristol ===
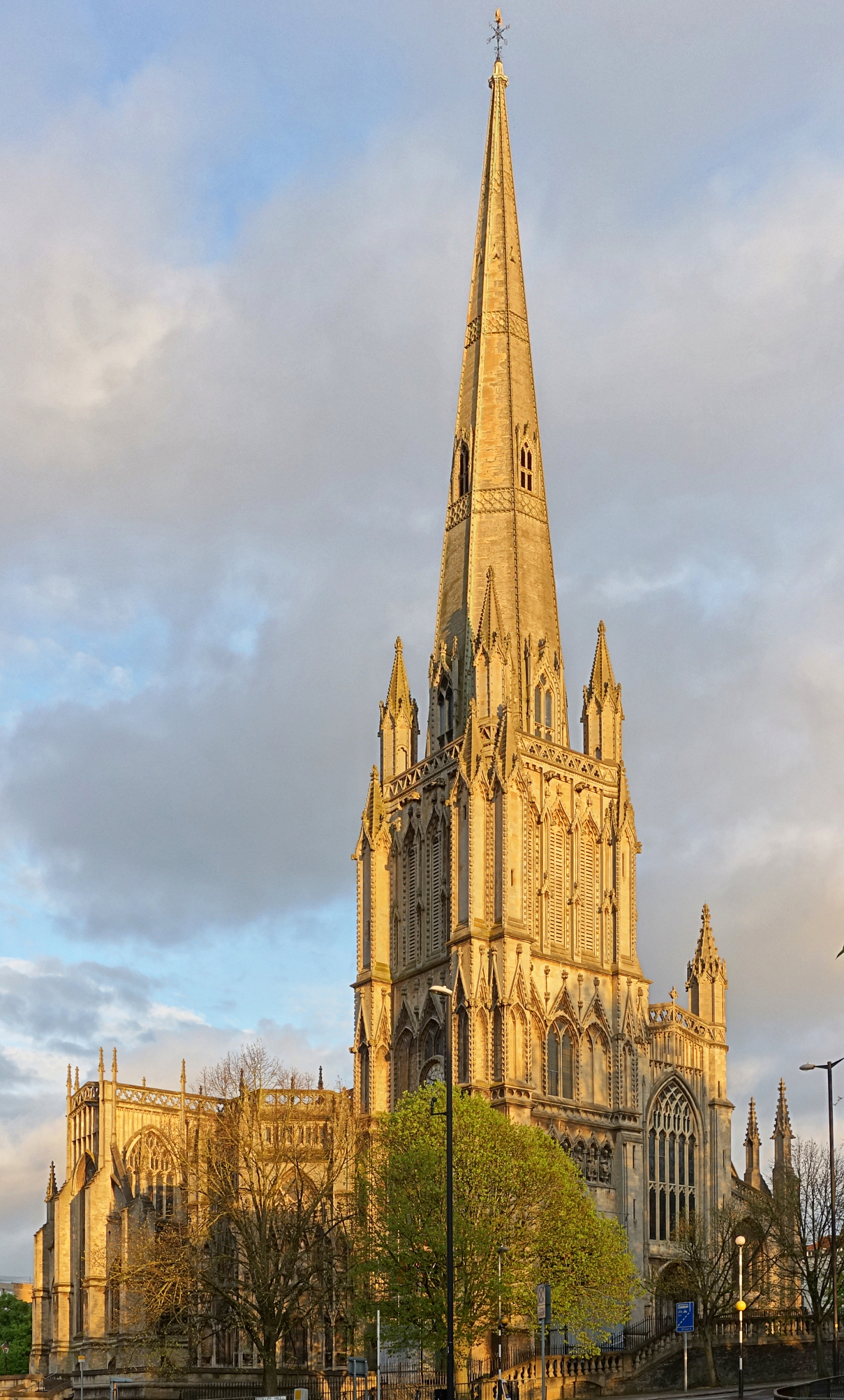
St Mary Redcliffe, Bristol.

This is an extract from the St Mary Redcliffe official website:

William Canynges of Redcliffe Street - merchant, five-times Mayor of Bristol, its member of parliament and a principal benefactor of St Mary Redcliffe - was ordained priest after the death of his wife in 1467 and first celebrated Mass in the church on Whitsunday the following year. . .To commemorate this, William Spenser, also sometime Mayor of Bristol, made provision in 1493 for three sermons to be preached before the Mayor and commonalty on the days after Whitsun; a change to one sermon on Whitsunday was made at the time of the Reformation. . .Those attending carried nosegays and the floor of the church was strewn with rushes, traditions that are maintained to this day in the service held annually ever since and attended by the Lord Mayor, aldermen and Councillors of the City in their traditional robes and regalia.

== Rushcart ==
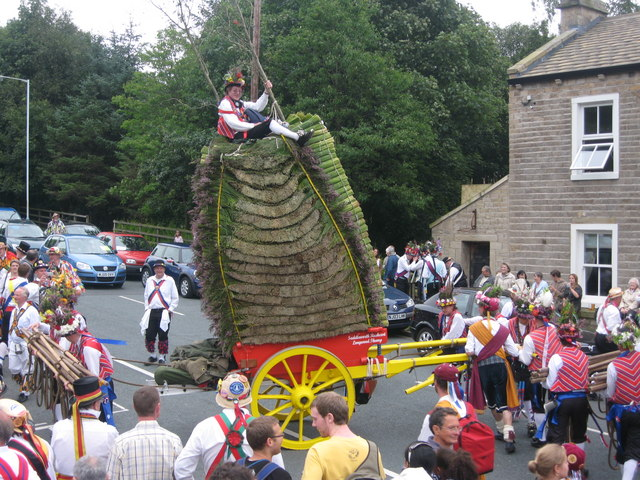
Saddleworth Rushcart in 2008

Rushcart is a tradition of rushbearing that originated in north-west England, whereby decorated carts were loaded with rushes and taken to the local church, accompanied by Morris dancers and other entertainment. (Note: LittleboroughLocal. . . " At Grassmere the rushes are still carried in procession, but in Lancashire and parts of Yorkshire the procession became more elaborate with the rushes being conveyed on decorated carts. . . ")

In many places there was much competition between towns and villages to provide the best decked rushcarts and in the early 19th century it was said that the Lancashire town of Rochdale could assemble at least eight, and sometimes a dozen rushcarts from the surrounding villages for the festival.

Some of the old rushcart traditions have been revived in recent years:

- Saddleworth Rushcart Festival. (Note: Rushbearing ( Richard Mabey ). . . " The Saddleworth Rushcart Festival, in which Morris Dancers drag a cart loaded with rushes around local villages, culminates in a rush-bearing service at Saddleworth church, Uppermill. . . ") (Note: See Saddleworth > Rushcart)
- Sowerby Bridge Rushbearing Festival. (Note: See Sowerby Bridge > Traditions)

== Rushbearing today ==
Rushbearing ceremonies have survived, or been revived, in a number of towns, villages and churches in northwest England including: Lymm, Forest Chapel and St Chad's Chapel, Tushingham in Cheshire, Gorton, Littleborough, and Saddleworth in Greater Manchester, Newchurch in Pendle in Lancashire, Sowerby Bridge in Yorkshire, and Ambleside, Great Musgrave, Grasmere, Urswick and Warcop in Cumbria.

Rushbearing is also found in some parishes in North-East Wales such as Holt and Isycoed on the west side of the River Dee.

Rush Sunday is one of the highlights of Bristol's civic calendar, upholding a tradition which goes back over 500 years.

== Types of rush used ==
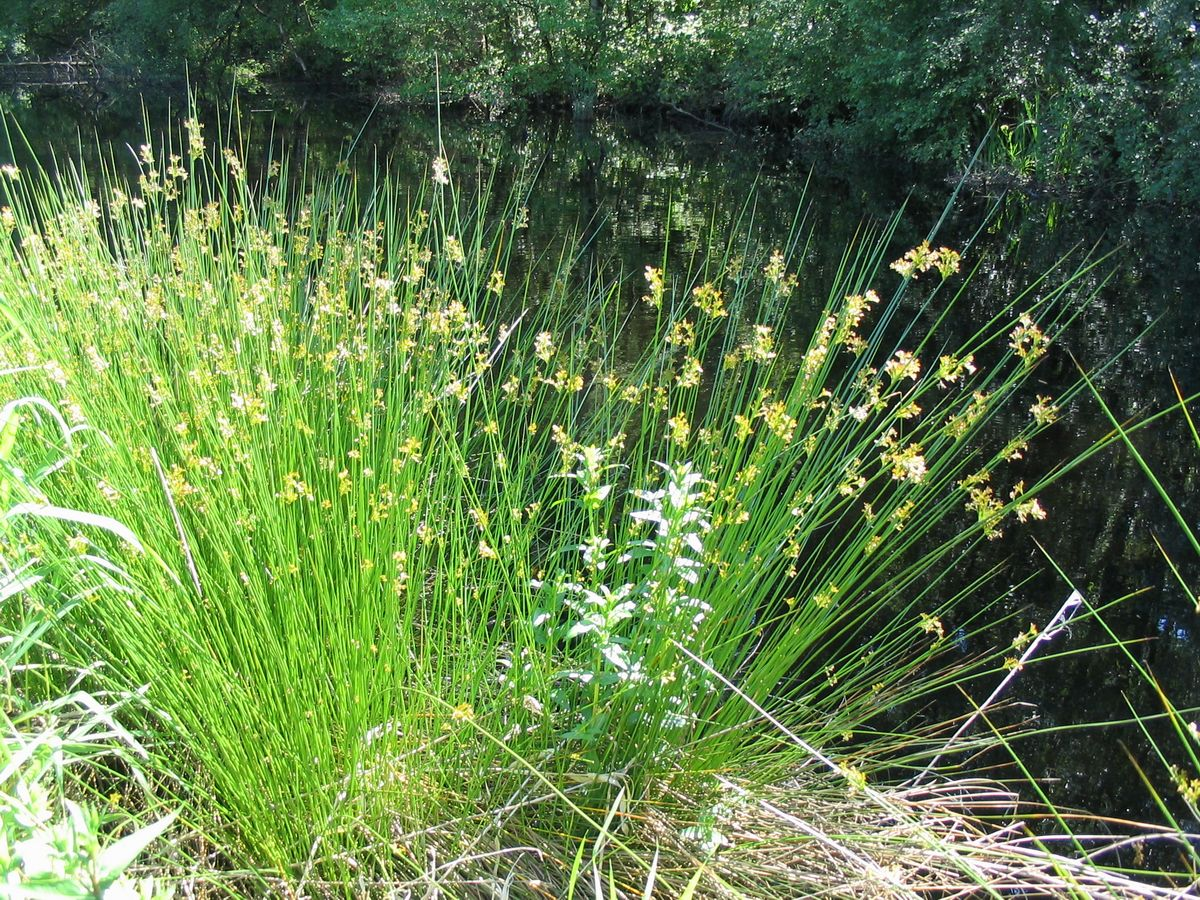
Common rush ( Juncus effusus ).

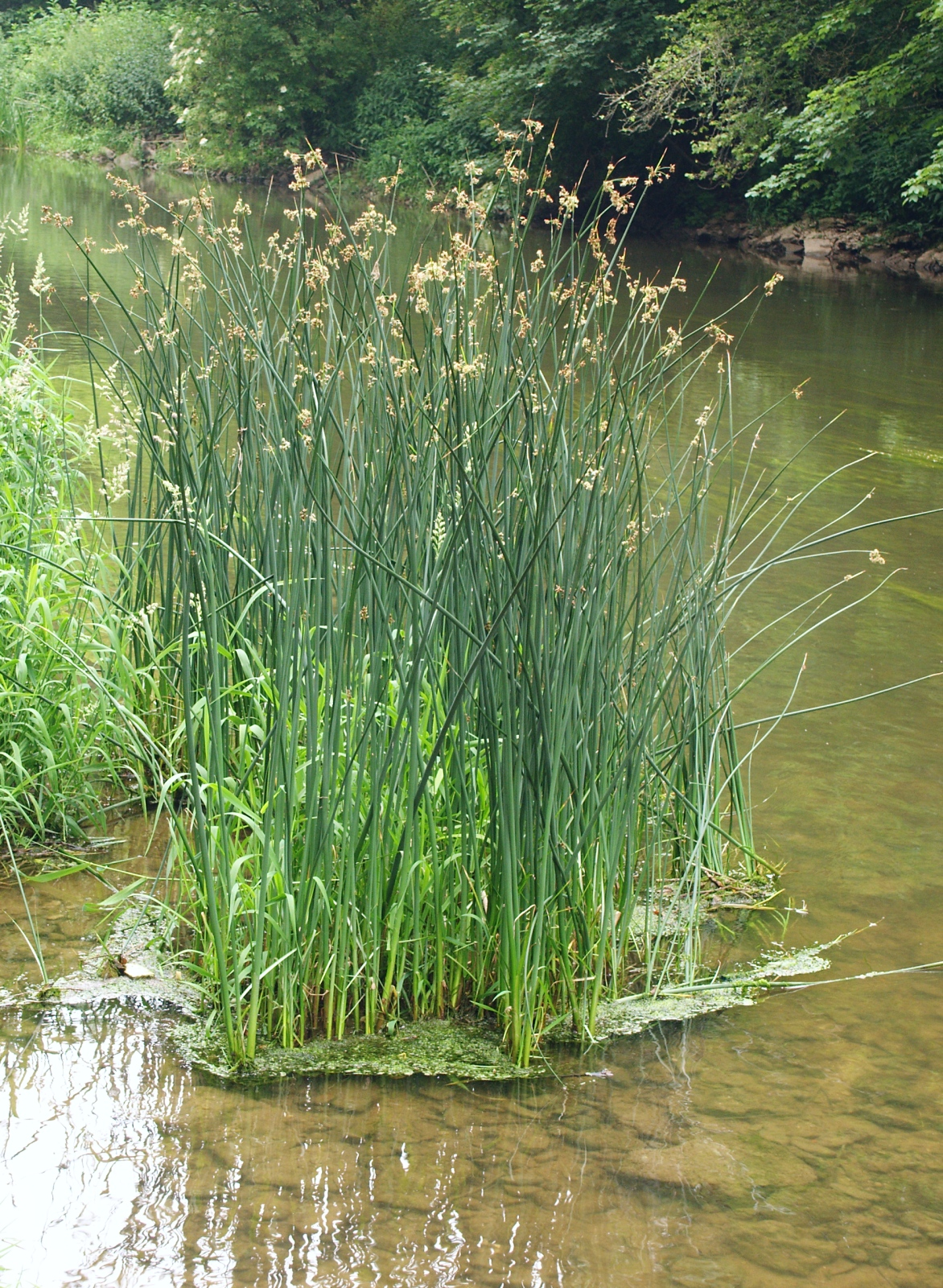
Common club-rush (Schoenoplectus lacustris).

Common club-rush was the preferred rush for rush-bearing. (Note: Common club-rush or Bulrush.Schoenoplectus lacustris ( Richard Mabey ). . . "Club-rush is one of the species that gave the ceremony of rush-bearing its title. . . ") Club-rush is more stout than common rush and therefore has better insulation properties. It is also more resistant to water rot. (Note: Common club-rush or Bulrush.Schoenoplectus lacustris ( Richard Mabey ). . . "Club-rush is a stout perennial found in shallow water in lakes, ponds, canals, slow rivers. . .It can reach heights of up to ten feet in height with a thickness of nearly an inch at its base . . . ")

=== Common names ===
The types of rush that were most commonly used for rush-bearing:

Rush family – Juncaceae Genus – Juncus

Species – Juncus effusus – prefers water logged ground. (Note: Soft rush.Juncus effusus (Richard Mabey). . . "This is a thin rush, growing in tufts up to three feet high. . .damp woods, water logged ground, marshes and ditches. . .was used in making. . .the rushlight. . . ")

- Common rush.
- Soft rush.

Species – Juncus conglomeratus

- Compact rush

Sedge family – Cyperaceae Genus – Schoenoplectus

Species – Schoenoplectus lacustris – prefers to grow in shallow water.

- Common club-rush. (Note: Common club-rush or Bulrush.Schoenoplectus lacustris ( Richard Mabey ). . . " The rounded stems are straight and jointless, which makes them ideal for plaiting and weaving into baskets, mats. . . ")
- Bulrush. (Note: Note that Bulrush is also a common name for Typha latifolia)

=== Habitats ===
Sedges and rushes prefer the wet and water-logged ground that is typical of the moors and fells of the Lake District, the North Pennines, the South Pennines and the Peak District.

Common club-rush (Schoenoplectus lacustris) prefers to grow in shallow water such as that found in lakes, ponds and along the edges of slow moving streams and rivers.

Common rush (Juncus effusus) prefers to grow in water-logged ground. It provides habitat for ground nesting birds such as curlew and lapwing. The RSPB advises farmers in the North Pennines that the optimum habitat for curlew and lapwing is a mix of grass (70%) and rush (30%). The rush provides some protection from predators, though excessive rush can be a problem. (Note: See Northern lapwing > Behaviour > It is a wader that breeds on cultivated land and other short vegetation habitats. 3–4 eggs are laid in a ground scrape.)

Seaves (Note: See (Contents) > Dialect names for rush) were normally gathered from the local area, often by children, but sometimes it was necessary to import them from neighbouring areas. (Note: Rushbearing ( Richard Mabey ). . . " Rushes have been spread on the floor of Trinity House in Hull since time immemorial. The Norfolk Trust used to supply the rushes till 1968. They are now imported from Lastingham " . . .) If seaves were not readily available, for example along the Cumbrian coast, then substitutes such as marram grass from sand dunes were used instead. (Note: RUSHBEARING ( William Rollinson ). . . " In some churches near to the coast, for example Walney Chapel and at Dalton-in-Furness, marram grass from sand dunes was substituted for rushes " . . .)

== Dialect names for rush ==
During the medieval period sedges and rushes were known as "seaves". (Note: FARMHOUSES ( Yorkshire Dales ). . . " rushlights. . .which were made from seaves (rushes) dipped in tallow " . . .)

Noun	Adjective	Examples
seave (Note: WiKtionary : English dialect < seave >: 1. " A rush (the plant). ")	seavy (Note: WiKtionary : English dialect < seavy >: 1. " overgrown with rushes. ")	Seavy Sike.
seeve (Note: GLOSSARY ( William Rollinson ). . .Seeves, Sieves : Rushes, usually Juncus conglomeratus. . .)		
sieve (Note: RUSHBEARING ( William Rollinson ). . . " The great annual strewing was naturally undertaken in summer when the rushes or sieves on the fellside were fully grown " . . .)	seven	River Seven.

Examples of water-courses named from seaves:

- Candleseaves Sike near Rogan's Seat, Swaledale, North Yorkshire. (Note: WiKtionary : English < sike >: 1. " A gutter or ditch; a small stream that frequently dries up in the summer. ") (Note: Candleseaves Sike is a tributary of the River Swale.)
- Seavy Sike near Tan Hill, North Yorkshire. (Note: Seavy Sike : "Small stream overgrown with rushes".) (Note: Seavy Sike is a tributary of the River Greta and River Tees.)
- River Seph, Bilsdale, North York Moors. (Note: WiKtionary : English dialect < seave > From Old Norse sef, whence also Danish siv, Icelandic sef and Swedish säv (“club-rush”).) (Note: WiKtionary : Old Norse < sef >: 1. " sedge, rush ".)
- River Seven, Rosedale, North Yorkshire. (Note: See Rosedale, North Yorkshire > Natural England maps.)

Examples of bogs and moorland named from seaves:

- Candleseaves Bog, Skiddaw Forest, Cumbria. (Note: See River Caldew > Source of river)
- Seavy Side, Mosedale near Haweswater Reservoir, Cumbria. (Note: Seavy Side : "Summer pasture overgrown with rushes".)
- Seamore Tarn near High Cup Nick, Cumbria. (Note: Seamore Tarn : "Small lake on moor overgrown with rushes".) (Note: WiKtionary : Old English < mor >: 1. " moor ".; 2. " mountain ".) (Note: WiKtionary : English < tarn >: 1. " A small mountain lake, especially in Northern England ".)
- Seavy Rigg, Swindale Beck near Brough, Cumbria. (Note: Seavy Rigg : "Moorland ridge overgrown with rushes".) (Note: WiKtionary : English dialect < rig >: 1. " A ridge ".) (Note: Swindale Beck is a tributary of the River Eden.)
- Seaveybog Hill near Kettleness, North Yorkshire.

Examples of settlements that might be named from seaves:

- Seave Green near Chop Gate, Bilsdale, North Yorkshire.
- Seathwaite, Duddon Valley, Westmorland and Furness. (Note: Seathwaite : "Woodland clearing where seaves grow".)
- Seagrave, Charnwood, Leicestershire. (Note: Seagrave : "A ditch or trench where seaves grow".) (Note: WiKtionary : English < greave >: 1. " A ditch or trench ".)
- Seacourt deserted medieval village ( DMV ) near the City of Oxford. (Note: Seacourt : "Enclosure where seaves grow".)

== See also ==
- List of plants known as rush
- Maypole § United Kingdom
- Morris dancing
- Religion in England
