= River Seph =

River in North Yorkshire, England

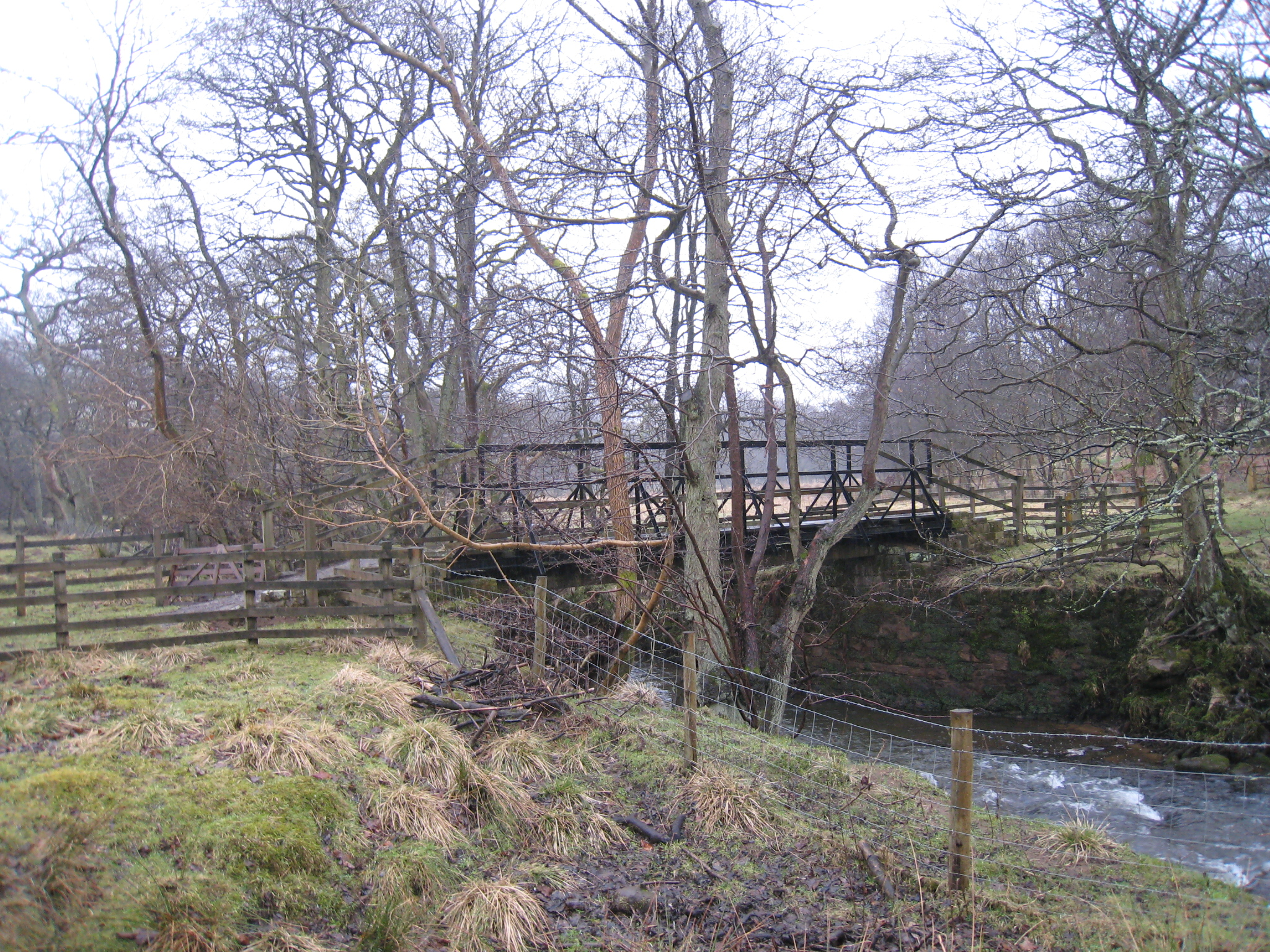
- Footbridge over the River Seph

- Location within North Yorkshire
- Etymology: Slow Stream

Physical characteristics
- Source
  - location: Chop Gate
  - coordinates: 54.386121°N 1.140853°W
  - elevation: 520 feet (160 m)
- Mouth: Seph Mouth
  - coordinates: 54.291175°N 1.146138°W
- Length: 13 miles (20.5 km)

Basin features
- Tributaries
  - left: Ledge Beck; Todhill Beck
  - right: Hollow Bottom Beck; Fangdale Beck

The River Seph (or River Sep) is a tributary of the River Rye (itself a tributary of the River Derwent) in North Yorkshire, England. The river flows for 13 miles (20.5 km) down Bilsdale and meets the Rye near the village of Hawnby. When the surrounding land was owned by Roger de Mowbray, the river was referred to as the Sep.

== Name ==
Common club-rush (Schoenoplectus lacustris) prefers to grow in shallow water such as that found in ponds, streams and river margins. (Note: Common club-rush or Bulrush.Schoenoplectus lacustris ( Richard Mabey ). . . " Club-rush is a stout perennial found in shallow water in lakes, ponds, canals, slow rivers. . .It can reach heights of up to ten feet in height with a thickness of nearly an inch at its base. . . ") During the medieval period sedges and rushes were known as " seaves ", (Note: See Rushbearing > Dialect names for rush.) hence the origin of the name Seave Green near Chop Gate at the head of Bilsdale.

The name Seph derives from Old Norse sef – " sedge, rush ". (Note: WiKtionary : English dialect < seave > From Old Norse sef, whence also Danish siv, Icelandic sef and Swedish säv (“club-rush”).) (Note: WiKtionary : Old Norse < sef >: 1. " sedge, rush ".) (Note: The North York Moors area is heavily influenced by the Old Norse language, for example Bilsdale is named from the Old Norse personal name Bildr. (Note: See Bilsdale > History.))

The meaning for River Seph might be:

1. Slow Stream or Calm.
2. River where seaves grow.
3. River overgrown with seaves.

Examples of rivers that might share a similar etymology:

- River Severn (Welsh: Afon Hafren) (Sephern – 1479). (Note: See River Severn > English name)
- River Seven, Rosedale, North York Moors. (Note: See Rosedale, North Yorkshire > Natural England maps.)

== Course ==
The river starts in Bilsdale at the village of Chop Gate where the waters of the Bilsdale and Raisdale Becks meet, though some of the sources start on Urra Moor. The river from source to where it meets the River Rye at Seph Mouth, is 13 miles (21 km) long. Historically, parts of the river were the delineating boundaries between ancient parishes.

Bilsdale is narrow and densely wooded at the head of the valley, but further down becomes wider and the water meanders before it joins the Rye.

== Natural history ==
The river has suffered with invasive species such as Himalayan balsam and Japanese Knotweed which have been the subject of various programmes to eradicate them. The river has also benefitted from a government grant to help fish navigation and a reduction in pollution.

It was known to be a good trout stream in the late 19th/early 20th centuries, and various agencies came together in 2015 to improve fish passages on the watercourse to allow the migration of trout from the River Rye.

The river flows across the south western edge of the North York Moors and as such has limestone, gritstone, mudstone and siltstone as its bedrock. During dry summers, the waters disappear into the bedrock and the river becomes totally subterranean. The sides of Bilsdale where the Seph meanders, are lined with ancient Oak trees and the North York Moors National Park Authority were granted Heritage Lottery Funding in 2017 to protect the land and study the wildlife along the upper reaches of the River Rye. This will include the Seph and will look at some of the native species which make use of the watercourse such as the alcathoe bat and the white-clawed crayfish.

== Settlements ==
Bilsdale is a remote valley populated mainly with hamlets as opposed to villages and towns. From the source of the Seph downstream, these are;

- Seave Green
- Chop Gate
- Cross Holme
- Fangdale Beck
