= St Hilda's Church, Bilsdale Priory =

Church in Bilsdale, North Yorkshire, England

Coordinates: 54°23′57″N 1°07′49″W

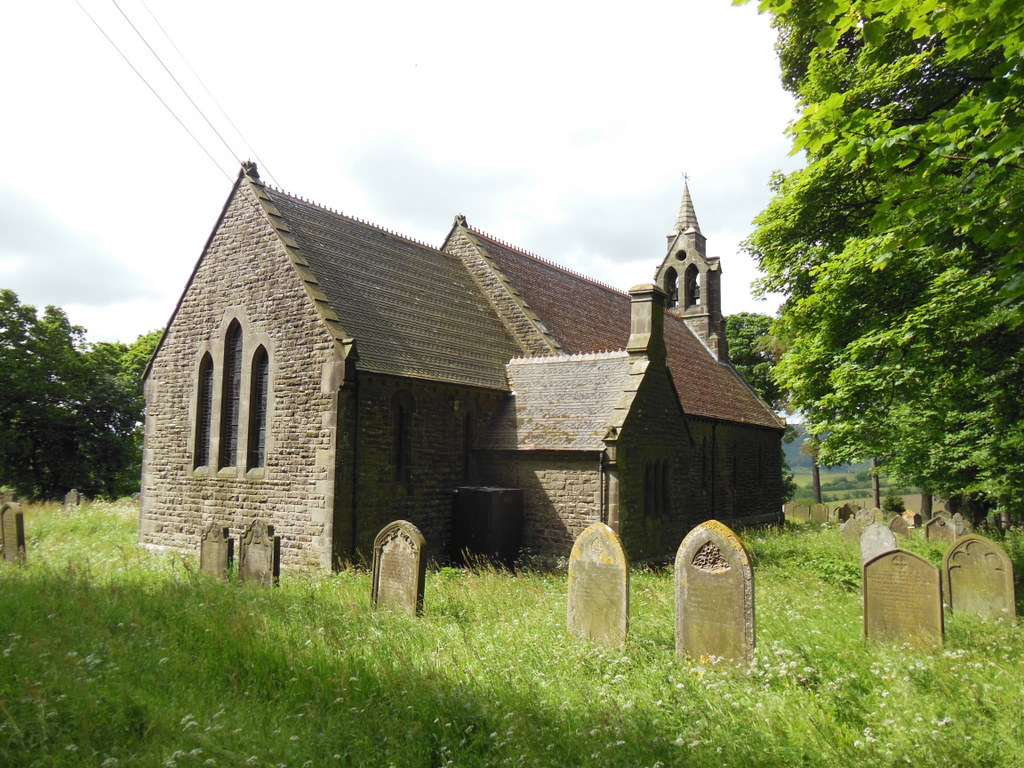
The church, seen from the north east

St Hilda's Church is the parish church of Bilsdale Priory, a parish in the valley of Bilsdale, in North Yorkshire, in England.

The first church on the site was founded by William Espec in 1122. It was restored and partially rebuilt in 1813. In 1851, it was replaced by the current building, designed by Robert Richardson Banks and Charles Barry Jr. It was Grade II listed in 1966.

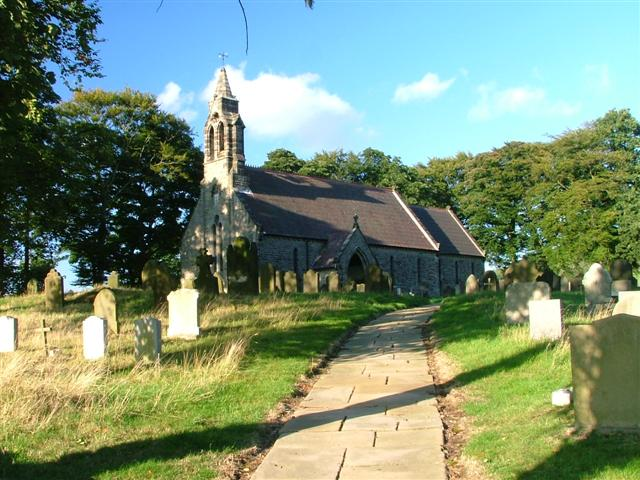
The church from the south west

The church is built of sandstone, and has a clay tile roof, with spiked tiles on the ridge. The building consists of a five-bay nave, two-bay chancel, north vestry and south porch. At the west end is a double bellcote and below a small tower and spire. There are lancet windows throughout, with the east window having three lights. Inside, there is a chancel arch with dogtooth moulding, and an arch-braced timber roof.

== See also ==
- Listed buildings in Bilsdale Midcable
