= St John's Church, Bilsdale Midcable =

Church in Bilsdale Midcable, North Yorkshire, England

Coordinates: 54°20′37″N 1°07′09″W

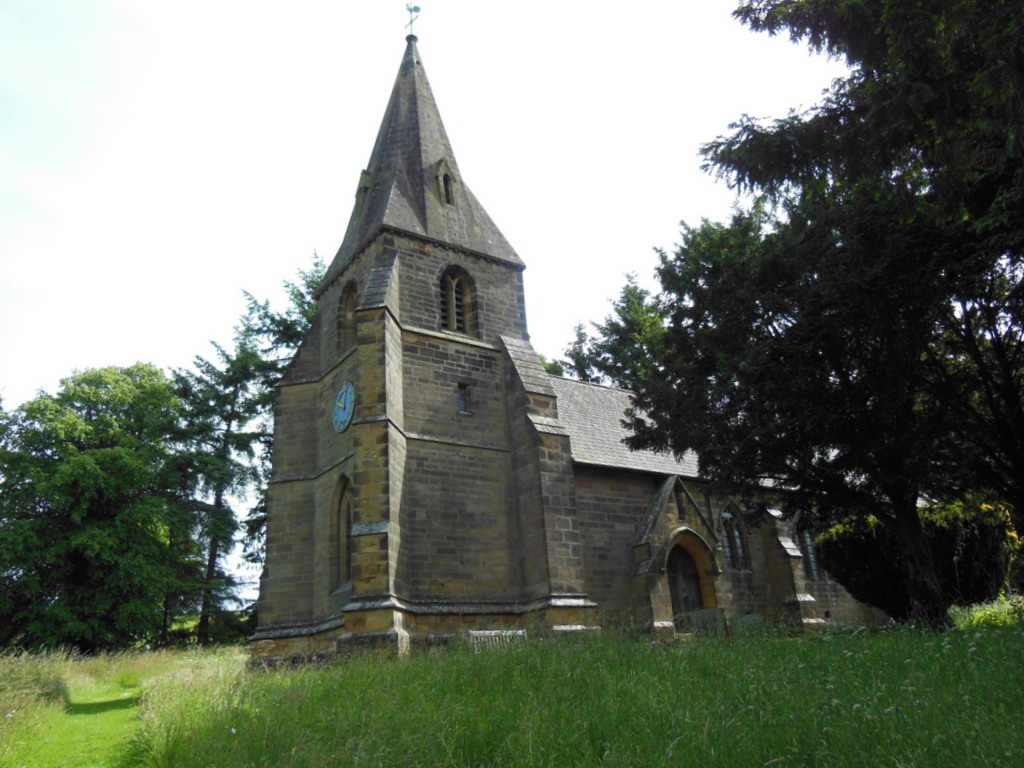
The church, seen from the south-west

St John's Church is the parish church of Bilsdale Midcable, in North Yorkshire, in England.

The church was designed by Temple Moore, in the Decorated style. Its foundation stone was laid by the Earl of Feversham in 1893, and the building was consecrated in 1896. It was Grade II listed in 1966.

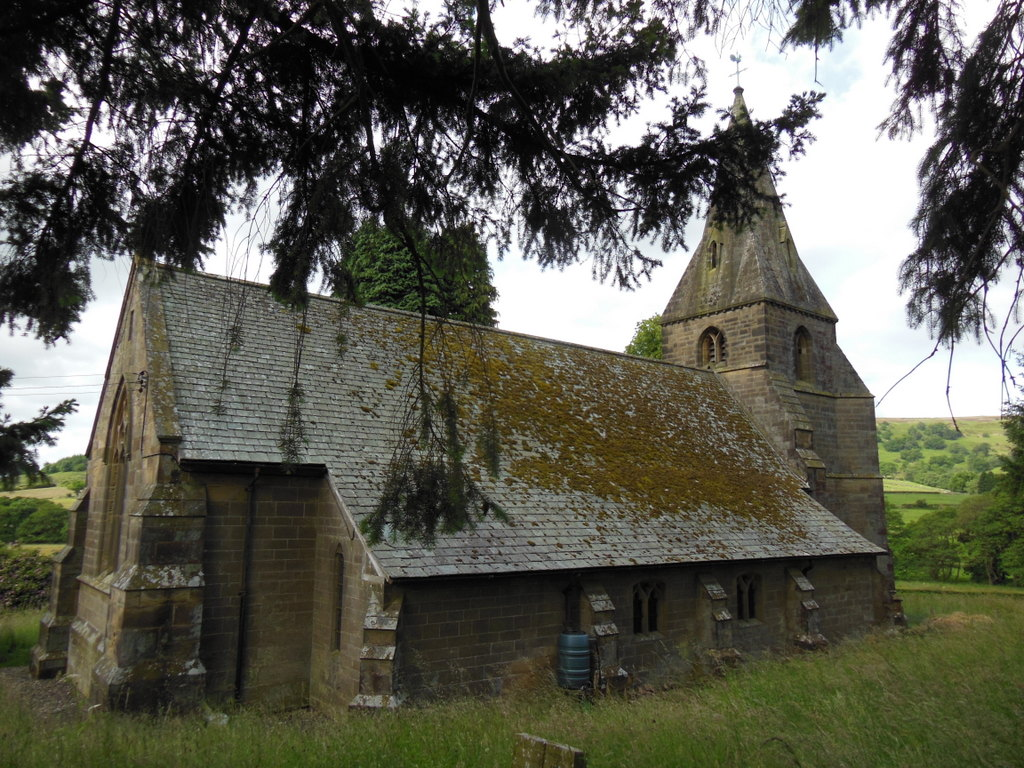
View of the church from the north-east

The church is built of Yorkshire sandstone, and has a Lakeland slate roof with a stone ridge and copings. It consists of a continuous nave and chancel, a north aisle, and a west steeple. The steeple has a square tower with three stages, stepped diagonal buttresses, a stepped and moulded plinth, and a west window with Y-tracery. Above this is a clock face, bell openings with Y-tracery, and an octagonal broach spire with lucarnes and a weather vane. The door is up four steps, with bootscrapers either side. Inside, the east bay of the aisle serves as a vestry. There is extensive original woodwork, including the benches, pulpit, choir seats and desks. The chancel is slightly raised and has a chequered stone floor, and a piscina in the south wall.

== See also ==
- Listed buildings in Bilsdale Midcable
