= Stingamires =

Building in Bilsdale, North Yorkshire, England

Coordinates: 54°21′15″N 1°08′06″W

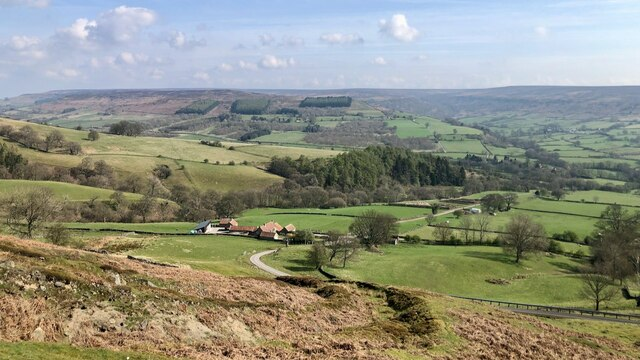
The house, in the surrounding countryside

Stingamires is a historic house in Bilsdale, a valley in North Yorkshire, in England.

The building was constructed in the 17th century as a farmhouse, in the form of a cruck-framed longhouse. Around 1756, it was partly rebuilt, providing a service room by the inner parlour. The building was restored in the 20th century as a private house, and it was Grade II* listed in 1990.

The two-storey building forms a long range built of sandstone. It has a pantile roof with a tile ridge, replacing earlier thatch. The roof has stone copings and curved kneelers. The house contains a doorway with a chamfered surround, a fire window, and horizontally-sliding sash windows, those in the ground floor with chamfered surrounds, and those above in half-dormers. The attached projecting outbuilding contains a door and a garage door. Inside the house a full cruck truss survives. There is a fireplace dated 1756, with a contemporary cupboard and salt box, an 18th-century stone fireplace, and a 19th-century bread oven.

== See also ==
- Grade II* listed buildings in North Yorkshire (district)
- Listed buildings in Bilsdale Midcable
