= Wakes week =

Vacation period in parts of England

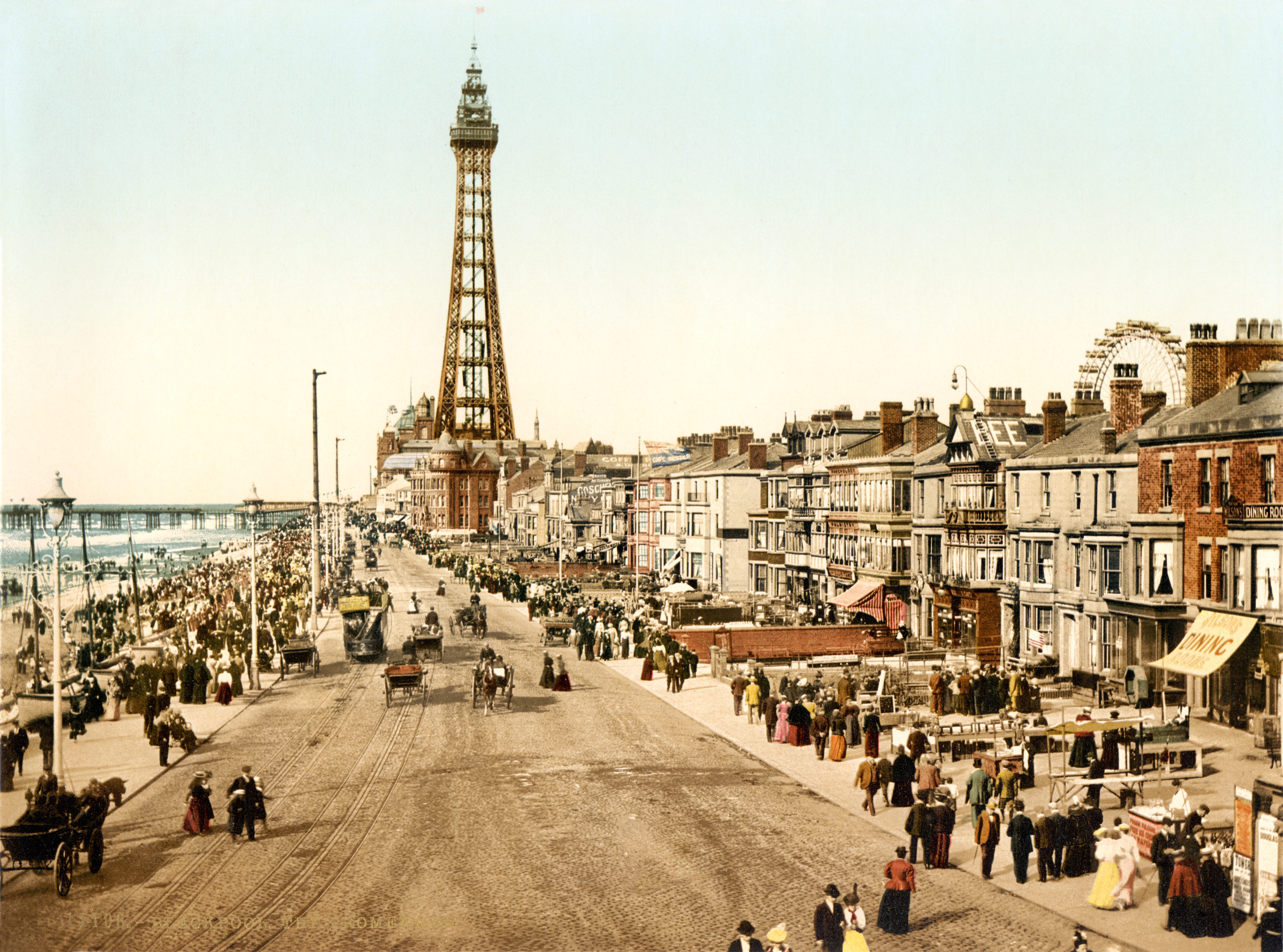
The promenade, Blackpool in 1898

The Wakes Week is a holiday period in parts of England. Originally a religious celebration or feast, the tradition of the Wakes Week developed into a secular holiday, particularly in North West England during the Industrial Revolution.

Although a strong tradition during the 19th and 20th centuries, the observance of the holiday has almost disappeared in recent times, due to the decline of the manufacturing industries in the United Kingdom and the standardisation of school holidays across England.

== History ==
Many Christian churches at their consecration were given the name of a patron saint, and either the day of the church's consecration or the saint's feast day becomes the church's festival. In England, church services began at sunset on Saturday and the night of prayer was called a vigil, eve or, due to the late hour "wake", from the Old English waecan. Each village had a wake with quasi-religious celebrations such as rushbearing followed by church services then sports, games, dancing and drinking. As wakes became more secular the more boisterous entertainments were moved from the sabbath to Saturday, and Monday was reserved for public entertainments such as bands, games and funfairs.

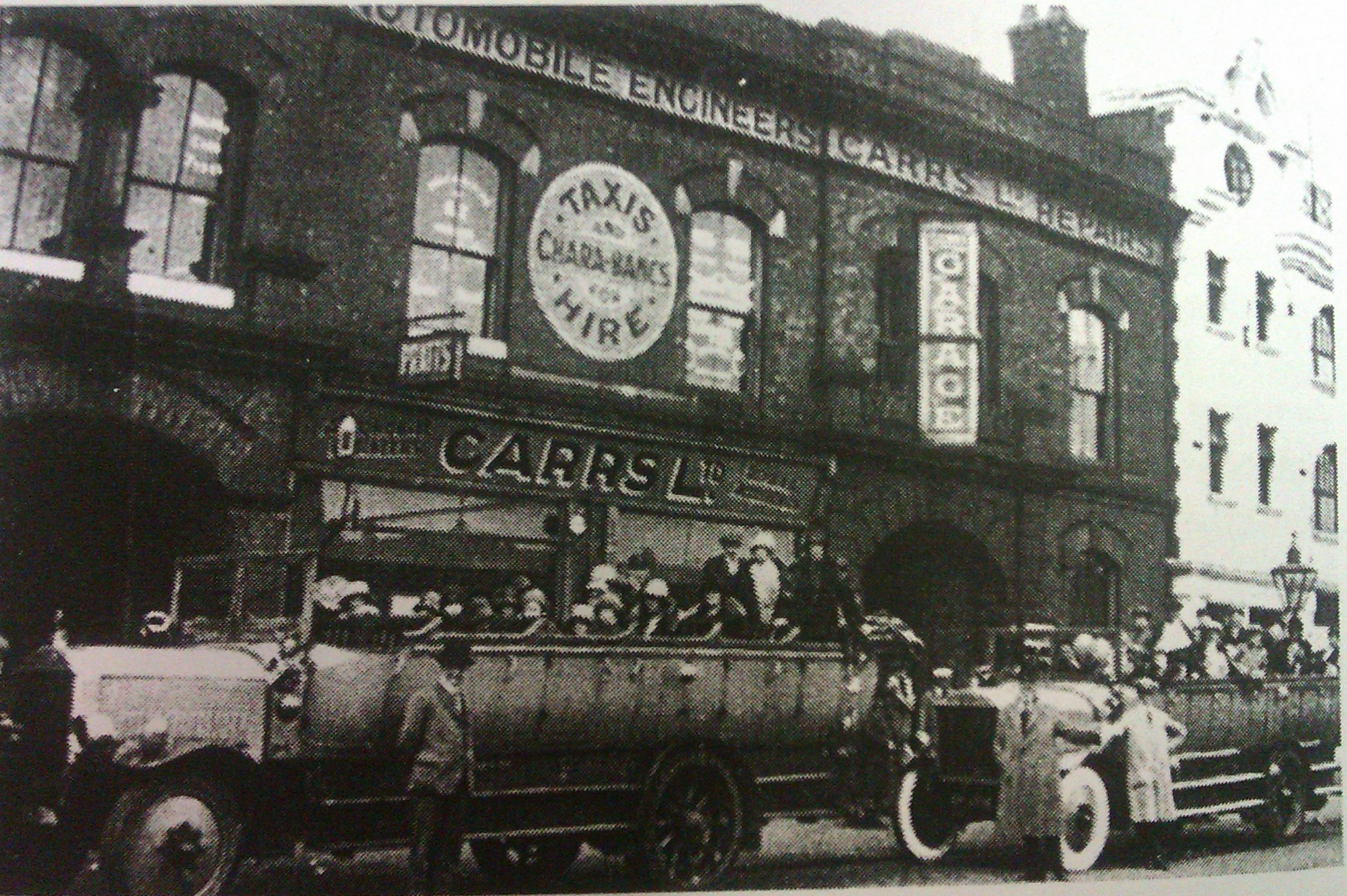
Charabancs picking up passengers in Bury, Lancashire for a wakes week excursion around 1920

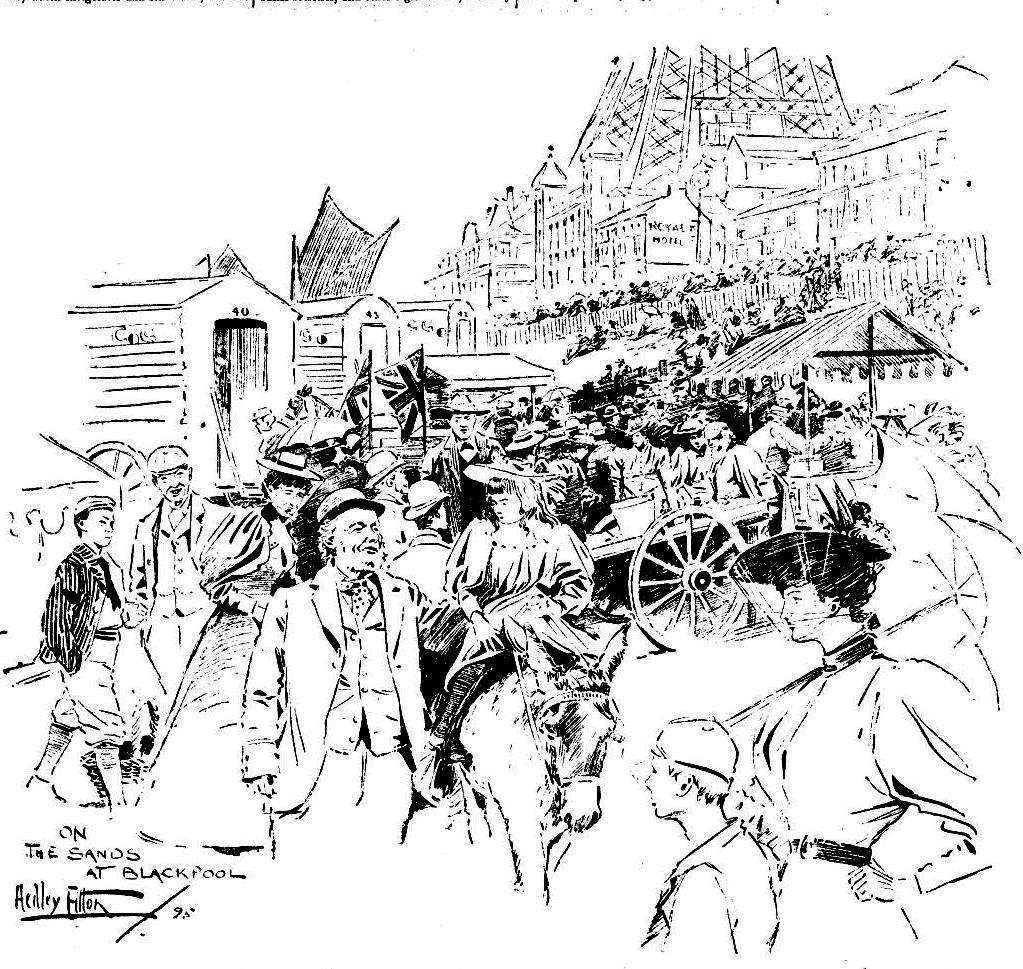
Blackpool Sands August 1895

During the Industrial Revolution the tradition of the wakes was adapted into a regular summer holiday particularly, but not exclusively, in some parts of the North of England and industrialised areas of the Midlands where each locality nominated a wakes week during which the local factories, collieries and other industries closed for a week. The wakes holiday started as an unpaid holiday when the mills and factories were closed for maintenance.

Each town in Lancashire took the holiday on a different week in the summer so that from June to September each town was on holiday a different week. In 1906, an agreement on unpaid holidays was reached which became the pattern for the Wakes holidays in Lancashire mill towns. It was implemented in 1907 and guaranteed 12 days annual holiday, including bank holidays; this was increased to 15 days in 1915.

There was a long-held belief amongst the working classes of the North of England of the benefits of bathing in the sea during the months of August and September, as there was said to be "physic in the sea". The expansion of the railway network led Blackpool to become a seaside resort catering mainly for the Lancashire working classes. Southport catered for the slightly better off and Morecambe attracted visitors from the West Riding textile towns. The railway link to Blackpool from the mill town of Oldham was completed in 1846 and in the peak year of 1860, more than 23,000 holidaymakers travelled on special trains to the resort during Wakes Week from that town alone.

In the last quarter of the 19th century, trips increased from day trips to full weeks away and "Wakes Saving" or "Going-Off" clubs became popular. The saving clubs were a feature of the industrial North until paid holidays became a reality in the 1940s and '50s.

There is a merry, happy time,
To grace withal this simple rhyme:
There is jovial, joyous hour,
Of mirth and jollity in store:
The Wakes! The Wakes!
The jocund wakes!
My wandering memory now forsakes
The present busy scene of things,
Erratic upon Fancy's wings,
For olden times, with garlands crown'd
And rush-carts green on many a mound.
In hamlets bearing a great name,
The first in astronomic fame.
— From The Village Festival by Droylsden poet Elijah Ridings (1802–1872).

== Present day ==
The tradition has now disappeared in most of the UK, due to the decline of traditional manufacturing industries and schools objecting to the holidays at exam times. It was common for local authorities to allocate a one-week school holiday to coincide with Wakes Week in lieu of holiday time elsewhere in the year, but schools began to discontinue the Wakes Week holiday after the introduction of the National Curriculum and the standardisation of school holidays across England. Councils no longer have a statutory power to set dates for public holidays following the introduction of the Employment Act 1989.

== See also ==
- Whit Friday
