= Spout House =

Grade I listed house in North Yorkshire, England

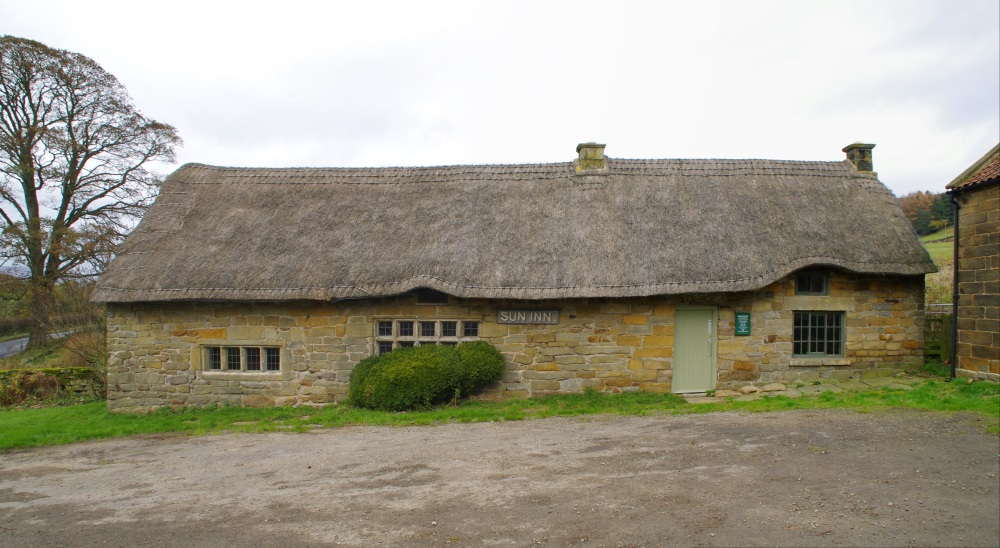
- The building in 2013
- Former names: Sun Inn

General information
- Status: Converted into a museum
- Type: Inn (former; originally a house)
- Location: Bilsdale, North Yorkshire, England
- Coordinates: 54.33447°N 1.11823°W
- Year built: 16th century
- Renovated: 17th and 18th century (altered)

Design and construction
- Designations

Listed Building – Grade I
- Official name: Spout House
- Designated: 23 June 1966
- Reference no.: 1150636

Spout House is a historic building in Bilsdale, a valley in North Yorkshire, England.

A farm existed at Spout House from at least the 14th century. In about 1550, the current house was constructed. In 1714, it was converted into the Sun Inn, which operated until 1914, when it relocated into a larger building across the farmyard. The old pub was preserved, and in 1979, it opened as a museum. It has been Grade I listed since 1966, and is described by Historic England as "an exceptionally well preserved survival".

The single-storey building is built of sandstone, which may have replaced original timber framing. It has a thatched roof, and stone chimneystacks. It was originally constructed as a cruck-framed building, three bays long, with a through passage. This appears to have been altered in the late 17th century, while in the 18th century part of the rear wall was rebuilt, and a cellar extension was added. There are a variety of windows, including one four-light window which may have been moved from Helmsley Castle. Inside, the forehouse room has a large open fireplace with a settle, an 18th-century hearth within it, and a 19th-century cast-iron range. There is also a smaller downhouse room, converted into a parlour, the small original parlour, and a dairy with stone steps down to the cellar. There is also an attic with two built-in beds.

== See also ==
- Grade I listed buildings in North Yorkshire (district)
- Listed buildings in Bilsdale Midcable
