= Laskill =

Hamlet in North Yorkshire, England

Coordinates: 54.308°N 1.137°W

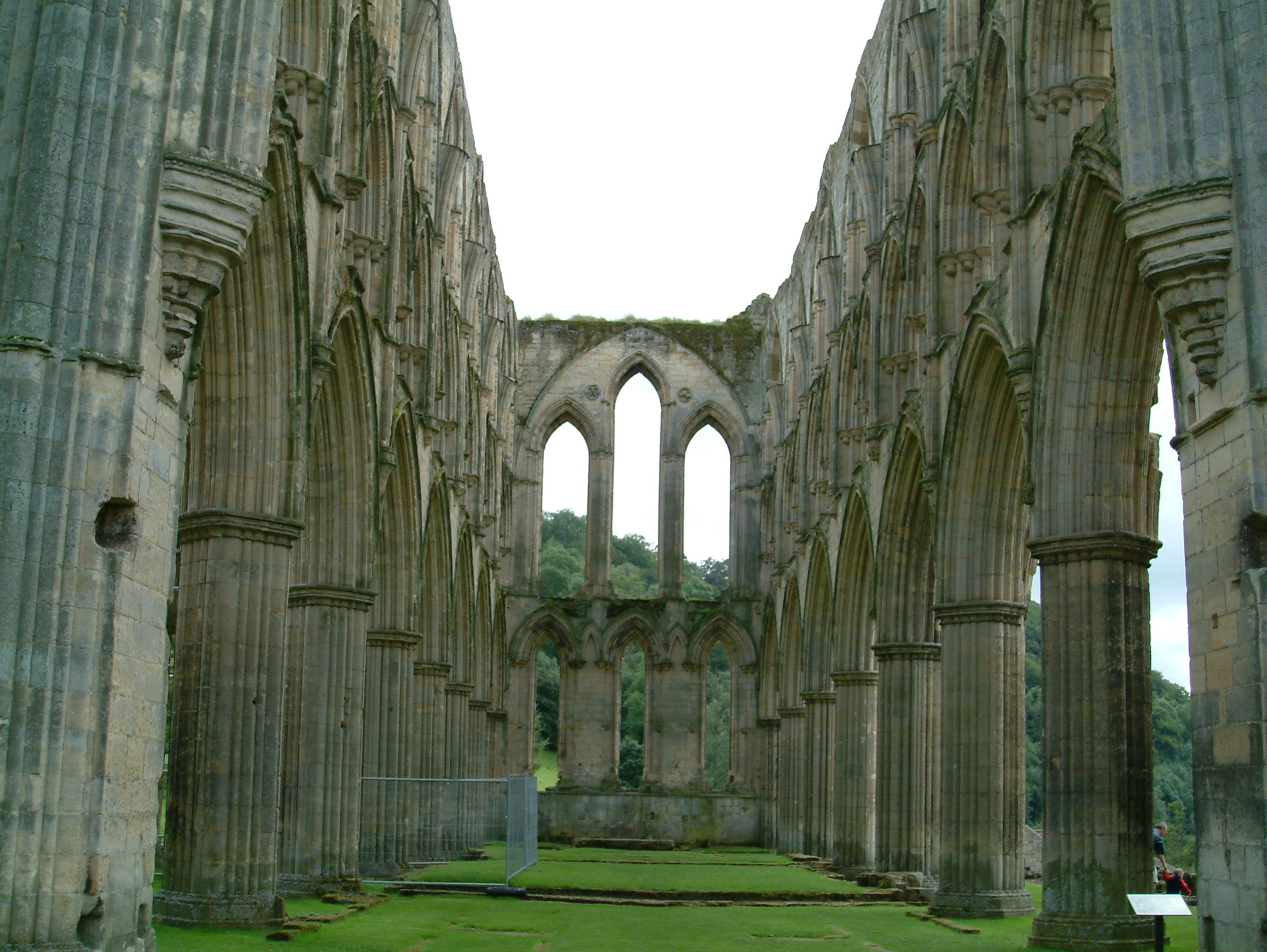
The ruins of the nearby Rievaulx Abbey

Laskill is a small hamlet in Bilsdale, 5 miles (8 km) north-west of Helmsley, North Yorkshire, England, on the road from Helmsley to Stokesley and is located within the North York Moors National Park. Archaeological investigations have revealed that the Cistercian monks of the nearby Rievaulx Abbey had a large woolhouse there, dating from the middle of the 13th century.

The Cistercian monks, known to have been skilled metallurgists, also had a blast furnace (the only medieval example yet identified in Britain) for the smelting of iron ore into cast iron. The iron ore left in the slag at Laskill has been identified by Gerry McDonnell (archeometallurgist of the University of Bradford) as more refined than anything else at the time, suggesting a much more efficient blast furnace technology than otherwise existed – perhaps as advanced as a modern blast furnace. The destruction of the abbey at Rievaulx by King Henry VIII during the Reformation put an end to this blast furnace and its advanced technology. Had the monks been allowed to share their new blast furnace techniques, which they frequently did with other advancements, the world might have entered the Industrial Revolution a full two and a half centuries earlier.

The name Laskill derives from the Old Norse lágrskáli meaning 'low shieling'.
