= Charabanc =

Sight-seeing vehicle

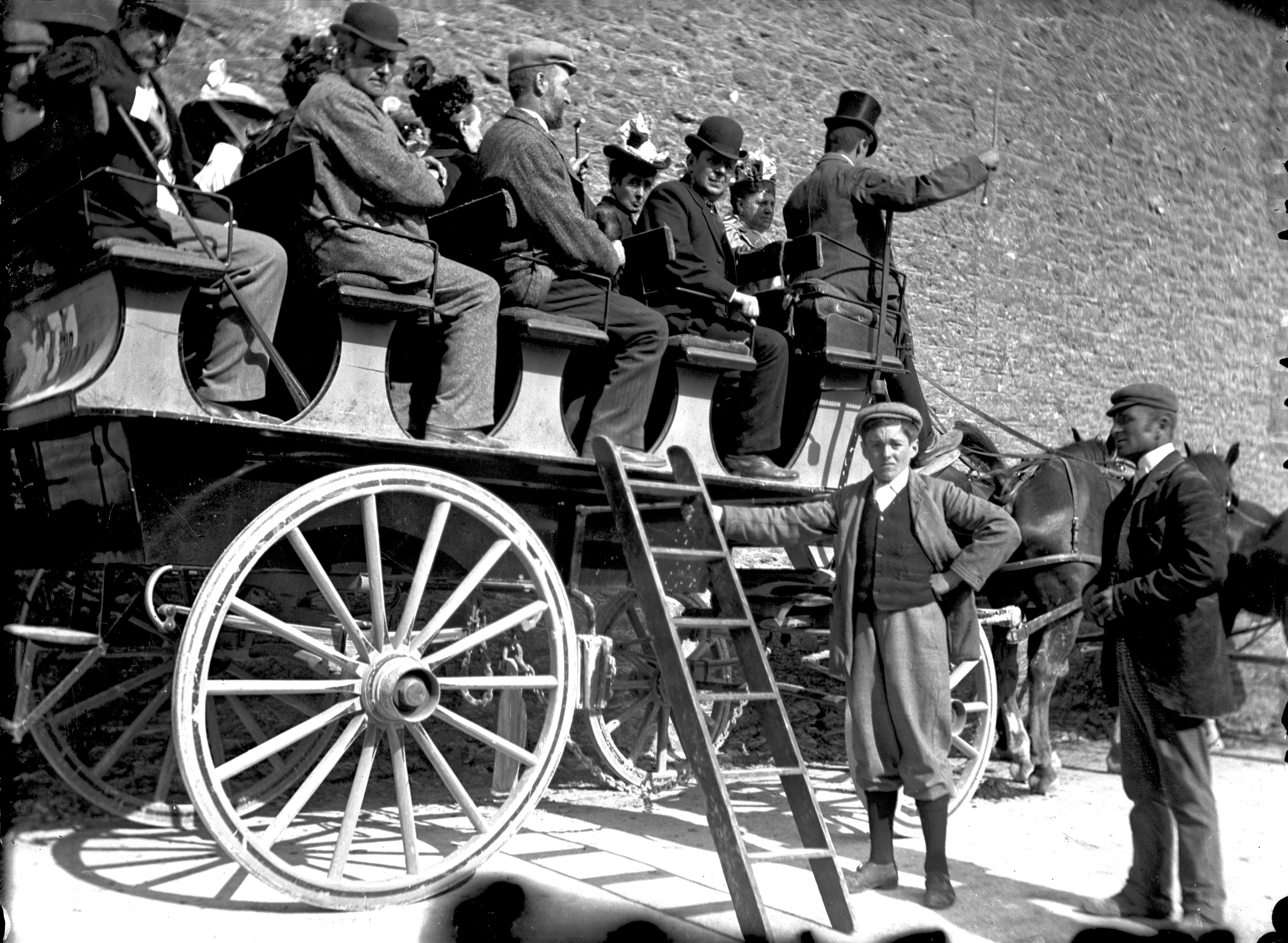
Charabanc, late 19th century

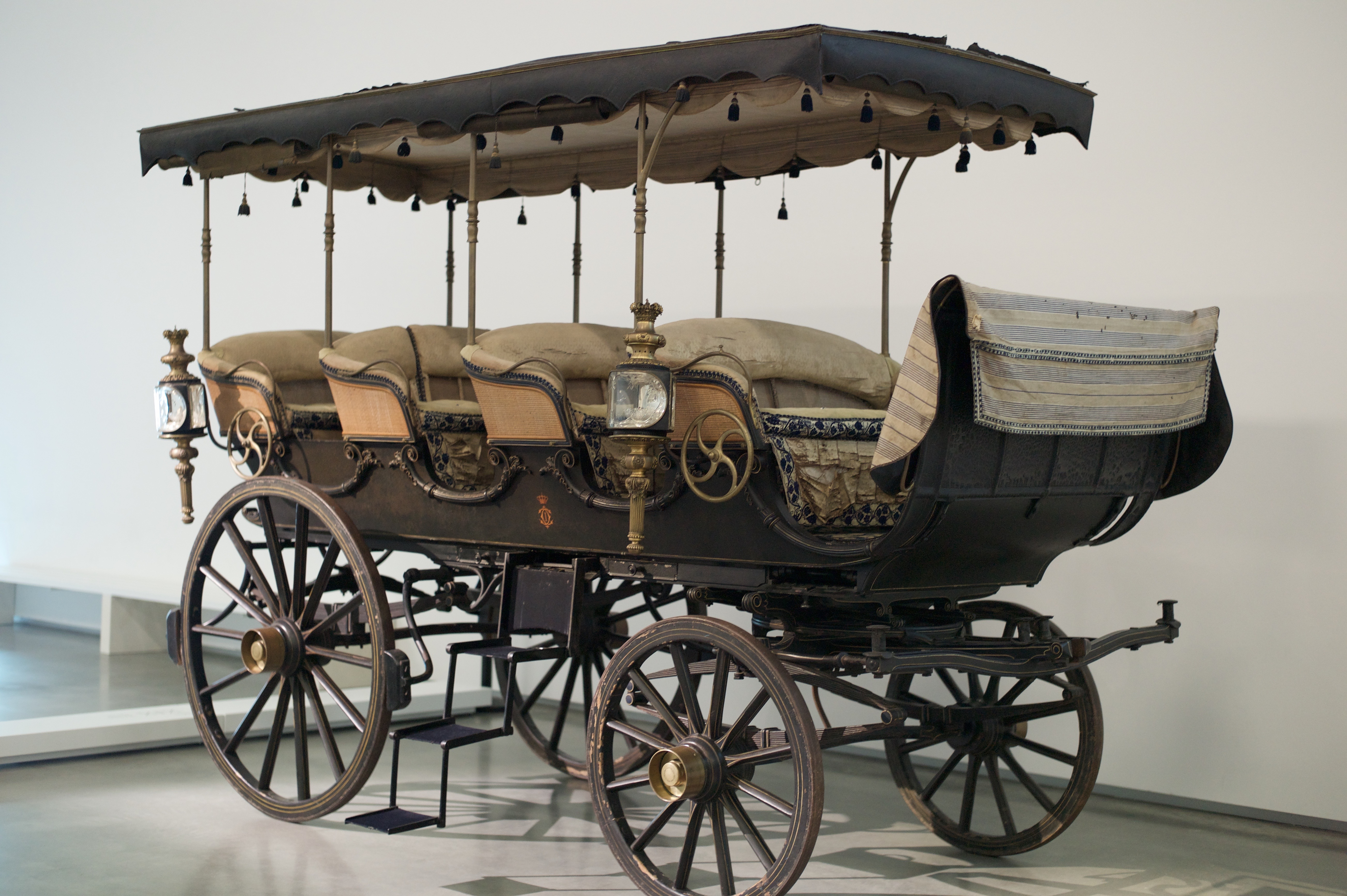
Royal Charabanc of Maria II of Portugal

A charabanc or "char-à-banc" /ˈʃærəbæŋk/ (often pronounced "sharra-bang" in colloquial British English) is a type of horse-drawn vehicle and an early motor coach, usually open-topped, common in Britain during the early part of the 20th century. The term remains in use for some public service vehicles in a small number of countries.

Traditionally, a charabanc has "benched seats arranged in rows, looking forward, commonly used for large parties, whether as public conveyances or for excursions". It was especially popular for sight-seeing or "works outings" to the country or the seaside, organised by businesses once a year. The name derives from the French char à bancs ("carriage with benches"), the vehicle having originated in France in the early 19th century.

Although the vehicle has not been common on the roads since the 1920s, a few signs survive from the era; a notable example at Wookey Hole in Somerset warns that the road to the neighbouring village of Easton is unsuitable for charabancs. The word is in common usage especially in Northern England in a jocular way referring to works outings by coach.

In Australia a modern similar type of bus or motorcoach, with two lateral doors for each row of seats, survived up to the 1970s and was referred to as side loader bus; but all or most of them were not open-topped. One such bus based in Echuca, Victoria, has been restored and is used at the Port of Echuca on some public holidays and special events.

== History ==
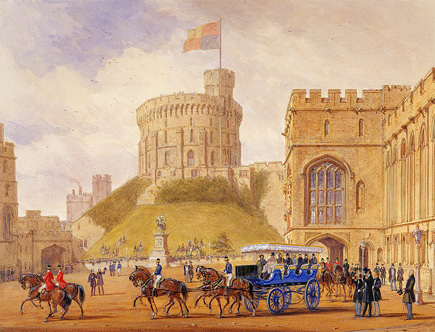
Windsor Castle 1844

Introduced in the 1830s as a French sporting vehicle, the char à bancs was popular at race meetings and for hunting or shooting parties where it served as a mobile grandstand. It could be pulled by a four-in-hand team of horses or a pair in pole gear. It had two or more rows of crosswise bench seats, plus a slightly lower rear seat for a groom, and most also had a slatted trunk for luggage. Initially used by the wealthy, they were later enlarged with more seats for school or works excursions and tourist transport, as a cheaper version of the tourist coach. The first charabanc in Britain was presented to Queen Victoria by Louis Philippe of France and is preserved in the Royal Mews.

== Motorized charabancs ==
Before the First World War, motor charabancs were used mainly for day trips, as they were not comfortable enough for longer journeys, and were largely replaced by motor buses in the 1920s.

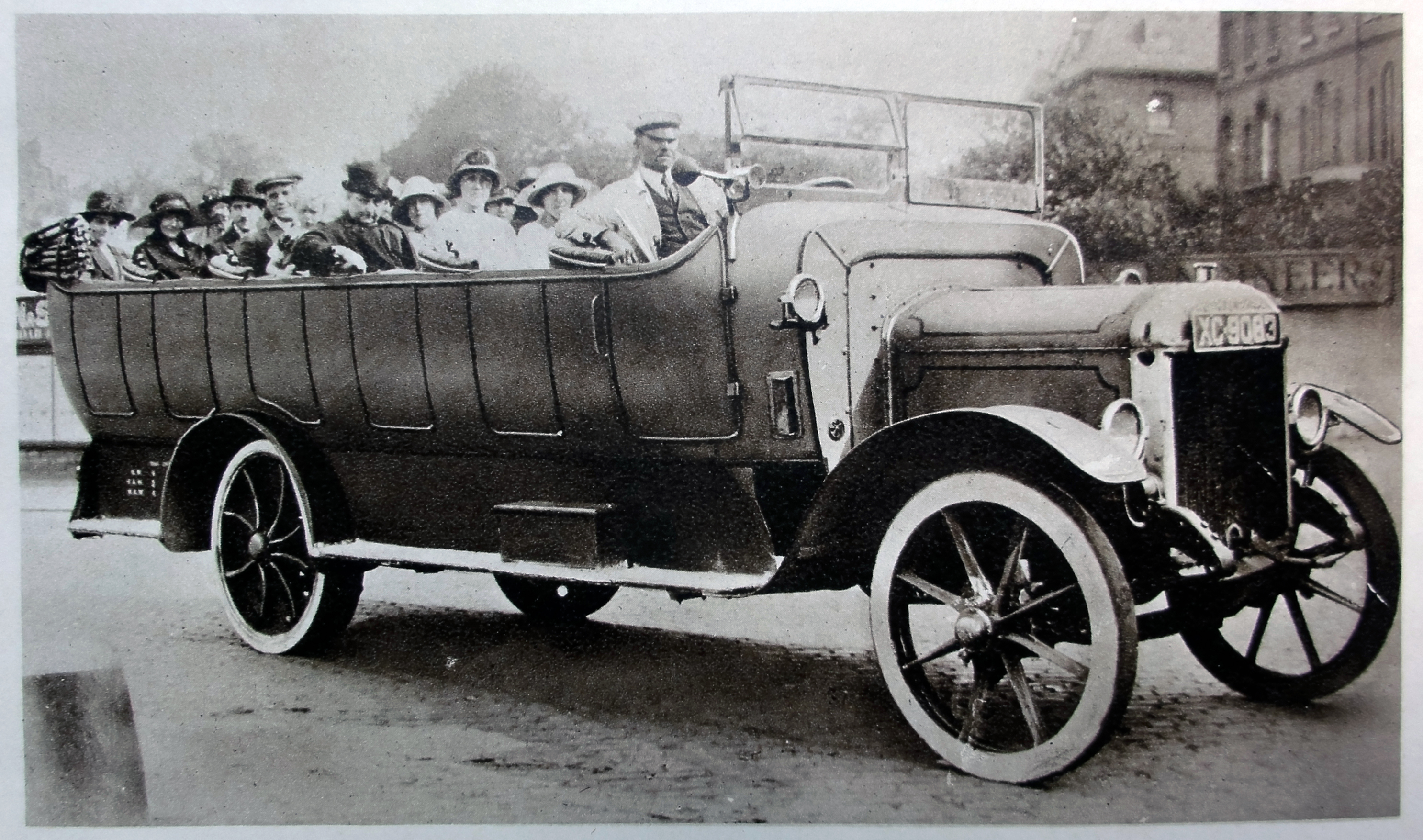
Motorised charabanc, early 1920s

The charabanc of the 1920s tended to last only a few years. It was normal at the time for the body to be built separately from the motor chassis, and some were fitted in summer only; a second goods body would be fitted in its place in winter to keep the vehicle occupied.

Charabancs were normally open-top, with a large canvas folding hood stowed at the rear in case of rain, much like a convertible motor car. If rain started, this had to be pulled into position, a very heavy task, and it was considered honourable for the male members of the touring party to assist in getting it into position. The side windows would be of mica (a thin layer of quartz-like stone).

The charabanc offered little or no protection to the passengers in the event of an overturning accident, they had a high centre of gravity when loaded (and particularly if overloaded), and they often traversed the steep and winding roads leading to the coastal villages popular with tourists. These factors led to fatal accidents, which contributed to their early demise.

=== English day outings ===
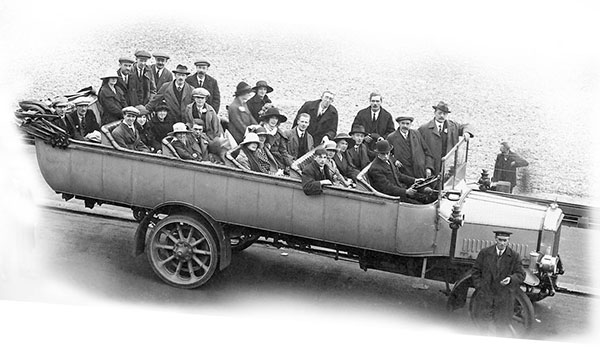
Staff outing (Biddles printing)

Factory day outings (annual works trips) in the 19th and early 20th century were quite common for workers, especially for those from the northern weaving mill towns of Lancashire and Yorkshire during the wakes weeks. The 1940s and 1950s were relatively hard times due to national recovery being slow after the Second World War; rationing was still evident, and annual holidays had not really become established for poorer workers such as weavers and spinners, so a day's outing to the seaside was a rare treat and all that some workers with large families could afford. "Charabanc trips" were usually only for adults, again due to finance. Occasionally the mill owner would help to pay for these outings, but this was not always the case.

The charabancs, or coaches, were pretty basic vehicles; noisy, uncomfortable and often poorly upholstered with low-backed seats and used mainly for short journeys to the nearest resort town or the races. Some working men's clubs also organised days out, and these trips were often subsidised by the clubs themselves from membership subscriptions that had been paid throughout the year. A few pence a week would be paid to a club or mill trip organiser and marked down in a notebook. This would be paid out to the saver on the day of the trip as spending money on the day. This day out would often be the highlight of the year for some workers and the only chance to get away from the smog and grime of the busy mill towns.

As the mills prospered and things improved financially, the annual wakes week took over and a one-week mass exodus from northern mill towns during the summer months took precedence over the charabanc trips, and a full week's holiday at a holiday camp or in a seaside boarding house for the full family became the norm, instead of a single day out.

== Modern usage of the term ==
In Malta, a British colony until 1964, the term (spelled xarabank) survives today, and is used to designate a public transport bus in Malta.

In Jersey, a char-à-banc is legally different from an “omnibus” (bus) - a bus picks up and sets down passengers along its route, while a char-à-banc picks up only from specified departure points and sets down at a pre-determined destination or destinations. Char-à-bancs generally provide tours of the island.

== Cultural references ==
In Rudyard Kipling's 1913 short story "The Village that Voted the Earth Was Flat", he recounts an outing in a motor char-à-banc.

In Agatha Christie's "The Dead Harlequin" (1929), from The Mysterious Mr Quin series, the young artist Frank Bristow reacts angrily to the older Colonel Monkton's dismissive (and presumably snobbish) attitude towards charabancs and their use in tourism.

In Dylan Thomas's 1953 short story "A Story", also known as "The Outing", young Thomas unintentionally finds himself on the annual men's motor charabanc outing to Porthcawl, where the charabanc is sometimes referred to as a "charra" in colloquial Welsh English.

George Harrison described the plot of The Beatles' 1967 film Magical Mystery Tour as "a charabanc trip".

A trip to the seaside is the subject of the 1978 humorous song The Charabanc Trip by Ivor Biggun.

== See also ==
- Charabanc (rail)
- Open top bus
- Songthaew
- Wagonette
