= Bilsdale Midcable =

Civil parish in North Yorkshire, England

Coordinates: 54.381°N 1.115°W

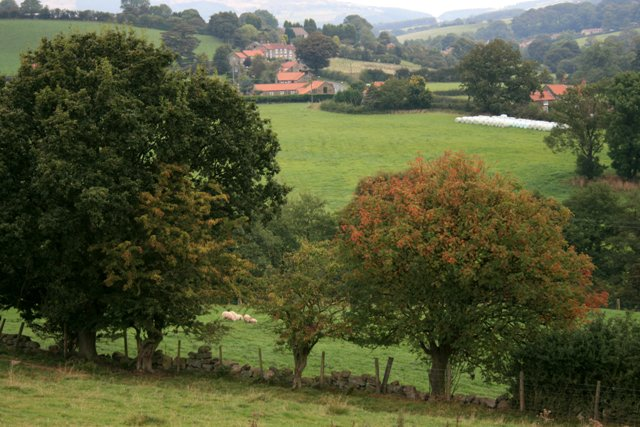
- Chop Gate

- Location within North Yorkshire
- Population: 332 (2011 census)
- Civil parish: Bilsdale Midcable
- Unitary authority: North Yorkshire
- Ceremonial county: North Yorkshire
- Region: Yorkshire and the Humber
- Country: England
- Sovereign state: United Kingdom

Bilsdale Midcable is a civil parish in North Yorkshire, England, which occupies the northern part of Bilsdale in the North York Moors National Park. According to the 2001 census it had a population of 293 increasing to 332 at the 2011 Census. Settlements in the parish are The Grange, Chop Gate (locally pron "Chop Yat"), Seave Green and Urra. The parish also contains Bilsdale Moor, East and West.

From 1974 to 2023 it was part of the Hambleton District, it is now administered by the unitary North Yorkshire Council.

== See also ==
- Listed buildings in Bilsdale Midcable
