= Listed buildings in Bilsdale Midcable =

Bilsdale Midcable is a civil parish in the county of North Yorkshire, England. It contains 29 listed buildings that are recorded in the National Heritage List for England. Of these, one is listed at Grade I, the highest of the three grades, two are at Grade II*, the middle grade, and the others are at Grade II, the lowest grade. The parish is mainly rural, and contains the small settlements of Chop Gate, Fangdale Beck and Seave Green. Most of the listed buildings are houses and associated structures, farmhouses and farm buildings. The others include two churches and a chapel, a forge and a telephone kiosk.

== Key ==
Grade	Criteria
I	Buildings of exceptional interest, sometimes considered to be internationally important
II*	Particularly important buildings of more than special interest
II	Buildings of national importance and special interest

== Buildings ==
Name and location	Photograph	Date	Notes	Grade
Spout House; 54.33447°N 1.11824°W		16th century	Originally an inn, later converted into a museum, it has a cruck-framed core encased in sandstone, and has a thatched roof. There is a storey and an attic, over three bays, and rear extensions. On the front are a doorway, a horizontally-sliding sash window, a five-light chamfered, mullioned and transomed window, a four-light mullioned window, and a small window under the eaves. In the left return are a two-light and a single-light round-headed window, and inside there are two pairs of cruck trusses.	I
Former house to west of Low Orterley Farmhouse; 54.37821°N 1.14220°W	—	c. 1600 (probable)	The house, later used for other purposes, has a cruck-framed core, it is encased in sandstone, and has a pantile roof with stone copings and kneelers. There is a single storey and a loft, and two bays. The windows include a fire window and a horizontally-sliding sash. Inside, there is a full cruck truss.	II
East Bank House and outbuildings 54.39354°N 1.12002°W	—	17th century	A row of buildings in sandstone on a plinth, with a roof partly in pantile, and partly in corrugated iron over the remnants of thatch. They consist of a farmhouse with one storey and an attic and three bays, a single-bay cottage to the right, and a byre and cartshed on the left, and they contain a variety of openings.	II
Stingamires and outbuilding 54.35422°N 1.13509°W		17th century	The farmhouse, later a private house, has a cruck-framed core. The buildings are in sandstone, and have a pantile roof with a tile ridge, stone copings and curved kneelers, and they form a long range. The house contains a doorway with a chamfered surround, a fire window, and horizontally-sliding sash windows, those in the ground floor with chamfered surrounds, and those above in half-dormers. The attached projecting outbuilding contains a door and a garage door. Inside the house is a substantial full cruck truss.	II*
Forge Cottage; 54.38945°N 1.14104°W		Late 17th to early 18th century	This consists of a cottage, at one time a post office, with later outbuildings, and a forge added in 1826. They are in sandstone with pantile roofs. The cottage has two storeys and two bays. The windows are two sashes, one horizontally-sliding sash, a casement, and a fire window. The cottage is flanked by single-storey outbuildings, the one on the left with a doorway. Further to the left is the former forge, with a central doorway that has a lintel with the date, initials and a carved horseshoe.	II
The Forge; 54.34428°N 1.12627°W	—	1723	The house, which was later extended, is in sandstone on a partial plinth, and has a pantile roof with a stone ridge and copings. There are two storeys, four bays, and a rear extension. The windows at the front are horizontally-sliding sashes, and at the rear they are casements.	II
Bridge End; 54.39465°N 1.13584°W	—	Early 18th century (probable)	The house is in sandstone on a plinth, and has a pantile roof with a stone ridge and copings. There are two storeys, three bays, a single-storey extension, and a projecting porch. On the front is a small fire window, and horizontally-sliding sash windows with lintels and keystone, and at the rear are small casement windows.	II
High Ewecote and outbuilding 54.35527°N 1.12057°W	—	Early 18th century	The farmhouse and outbuilding are in sandstone on plinths, and have pantile roofs, a stone ridge, copings and kneelers. The house has two storeys, the main part has two bays, and the narrower downhouse also has two bays. On the front is a doorway, and the windows are modern casements in the original openings. The outbuilding to the left has two storeys and two bays, and rear extensions. It contains two stable doors and two small windows, all under a long lintel. On the gable end is an external staircase.	II
Fangdale Beck Farmhouse and outbuildings 54.34440°N 1.12519°W	—	Early 18th century	The farmhouse incorporates a former byre on the left, and to the right is a barn. The buildings are in sandstone, and have pantile roofs with a stone ridge, copings and kneelers. The house has two storeys, three bays, and a rear wing. It contains a mix of casement and horizontally-sliding sash windows, and in the former byre is a casement window. The barn has one storey and a loft, and contains a large cart door and slit vents.	II
Low Crosset and outbuilding 54.34390°N 1.11508°W	—	Early 18th century	A farmhouse and attached byre in sandstone, with a pantile roof, and a stone ridge, copings and kneelers. The main block has two storeys and two bays and rear extensions, the downhouse has two lower storeys and one wide bay, and the byre has one storey and three bays. The house is on a plinth, and has a doorway, and casement windows with lintels and keystones. The byre has stable doors, garage doors and casement windows.	II
Seave Green House; 54.39360°N 1.13816°W	—	Early to mid 18th century (probable)	The house is in sandstone, and it has a pantile roof with a stone ridge, copings and kneelers. There are two storeys and three bays, a single-storey two-bay wing on the left, and wings and outshuts at the rear. On the front is a gabled porch, and the windows are casements, those in the main block with lintels and keystones.	II
Outbuildings north of Fangdale Beck Farmhouse; 54.34464°N 1.12539°W	—	18th century	The outbuildings consist of a granary, a byre, stables and a pigsty, built at different times. They are in sandstone with pantile roofs, and a stone ridge, copings and kneelers, and they form an L-shaped plan. The granary has two storeys and two bays and external steps, the byre has a single storey and contains a stable door, blocked doorways and a slit vent. The pigsty contains a casement window and a feeding chute, and the stable, at right angles, has a doorway, openings with heavy lintels, and external steps.	II
Hollin Bower; 54.33629°N 1.11323°W	—	18th century	A farmhouse that was later extended, it is in sandstone on a partial plinth, and has a pantile roof with a stone ridge, coping and kneelers. The original part on the left has a single storey and one bay, and the later part has two storeys and three bays. The windows are a mix, with casements, horizontally-sliding sashes, fixed lights and a bow window.	II
Barn and cartshed, Hollin Bower; 54.33647°N 1.11396°W	—	18th century	The barn and cartshed are in sandstone, with alternating quoins, and a pantile roof with a stone ridge and copings. The cartshed has a single storey and a loft, and an L-shaped plan. There are external stone stairs, a pigeon entrance with a shelf, and doors. The barn has two storeys and two wide bays, and contains stable doors and slatted windows.	II
Troughs, Hollin Bower; 54.33661°N 1.11408°W	—	18th century	A row of three sandstone water troughs. They are rectangular, they have central lips at both ends, and are fed by a constant spring from the right. At the rear is a wall, and in front is a platform of flags and a rounded outer kerb.	II
Stable Holme and outbuildings 54.35633°N 1.12558°W	—	Mid 18th century	The house and outbuildings are in sandstone on a plinth, and have a pantile roof with a stone ridge, copings and kneelers. The main part of the house has two storeys and two bays, and the lower downhouse has two storeys and one bay. The house contains a doorway, and horizontally-sliding sash windows with extended lintels and prominent keystones. To the left are outbuildings with a single storey, containing stable doors and horizontally-sliding sash windows.	II
Garden wall, The Forge; 54.34419°N 1.12622°W	—	18th century (possible)	The wall runs along the front of the garden and curves around on the left. It is in stone with large flat coping stones, and it contains a single iron gate with monolith piers.	II
Farm buildings, The Holme Farm; 54.41602°N 1.12328°W	—	18th century	The farm buildings are in sandstone, and have pantile roofs with a stone ridge, copings and kneelers. There are two storeys, the stable on the left has one bay, and the byre to the right has two. They contain stable doors, and the byre has external steps, and a pitching door in the upper floor.	II
Pigsty and stable, The Holme Farm; 54.41582°N 1.12316°W	—	18th century	The stable and attached pigsty are in sandstone, and have pantile roofs with a stone ridge, copings and kneelers. There is a single storey, and the pigsty is lower. They contain stable doors and blocked feeding chutes.	II
The Old Forge; 54.34404°N 1.12650°W	—	18th century	The forge was worked by water power. It is in sandstone, and has a pantile roof with a stone ridge and copings. There is a single storey and three bays, containing a central cart entrance flanked by blacksmith's windows. At the rear is an extension under a catslide roof containing machinery, and a small stable.	II
Water Mill, Low Mill Farm; 54.35045°N 1.12225°W	—	Late 18th century (probable)	The watermill is in sandstone, and has a tile roof with a stone ridge and copings. There are two storeys, two bays at the front, and three on the sides, a recessed wheelhouse to the left, and beyond that a mill race wall. The windows on the front are fixed, and on the sides are casements. The mill has a wooden undershot waterwheel.	II*
The Holme Farmhouse; 54.41595°N 1.12318°W		Late 18th century	The farmhouse is in sandstone, and has a pantile roof with a stone ridge, copings and kneelers. There are two storeys, three bays, and a long rear catslide. On the front are two doorways, and the windows are casements.	II
Mill House and stable 54.39778°N 1.17252°W	—	1819	The house is in sandstone, and has a pantile roof with a stone ridge, copings and kneelers. There are two storeys, three wide bays, and a short single-storey rear wing. The doorway is flanked by horizontally-sliding sash windows, and all have lintels with keystones, one dated and initialled. Attached is a single-storey stable containing stable doors.	II
Dovecote, Seave Green House; 54.39367°N 1.13818°W	—	Early 19th century (probable)	The dovecote, to the rear of the house, is over a store room and a privy. It is in sandstone, and has a pantile roof with a stone ridge, copings and kneelers. There are two storeys, the upper storey slightly jettied, and a single square bay. External steps under a stone flag roof lead up to a landing, and an entrance with a monolith elliptical arch. Above the landing roof are pigeonholes, and the windows are casements.	II
St Hilda's Church; 54.39905°N 1.13016°W		1851	The church is in sandstone with a tile roof. It consists of a five-bay nave, a south porch, and a two-bay chancel with a north vestry. At the west end is a double bellcote with a small square tower surmounted by a short spire. The porch has a moulded entrance, the windows are lancets, and the east window has three stepped lights.	II
Walls and steps, Methodist Chapel; 54.39073°N 1.14088°W	—	Early 19th century	The walls, which retain and enclose a small courtyard, are in sandstone with chamfered coping. The steps lead to an upper forecourt, and have a wrought iron gate.	II
Methodist Chapel and schoolroom 54.39080°N 1.14078°W		1878	The chapel is in sandstone on a chamfered plinth, with quoins, and a Welsh slate roof with a stone ridge, copings and kneelers. The entrance front has a pedimented gable, and it contains a central round-arched doorway with a radial fanlight, flanked by round-arched windows with voussoirs and Y-tracery. At the rear is a small embattled bell tower. On the right side is a later schoolroom with a projecting porch.	II
St John's Church; 54.34359°N 1.11909°W		1894–96	The church, designed by Temple Moore in Decorated style, is in sandstone, and has a Lakeland slate roof with a stone ridge and copings. It consists of a continuous nave and chancel, a north aisle, and a west steeple. The steeple has a tower with three stages, stepped diagonal buttresses, a stepped and moulded plinth, and a west window with Y-tracery. Above this is a clock face, bell openings with Y-tracery, and an octagonal broach spire with lucarnes and a weather vane.	II
Telephone kiosk 54.34425°N 1.12071°W		1935	The K6 type telephone kiosk stands near a road junction, it is painted green, and was designed by Giles Gilbert Scott. Constructed in cast iron with a square plan and a dome, it has three unperforated crowns in the top panels.	II
