= List of plants known as rush =

Common names for "rush" are usually related to a particular genus from a botanical family, for example:

- Rush family: Juncaceae
- Sedge family: Cyperaceae
- Bulrush family: Typhaceae

== Common names - British Isles ==
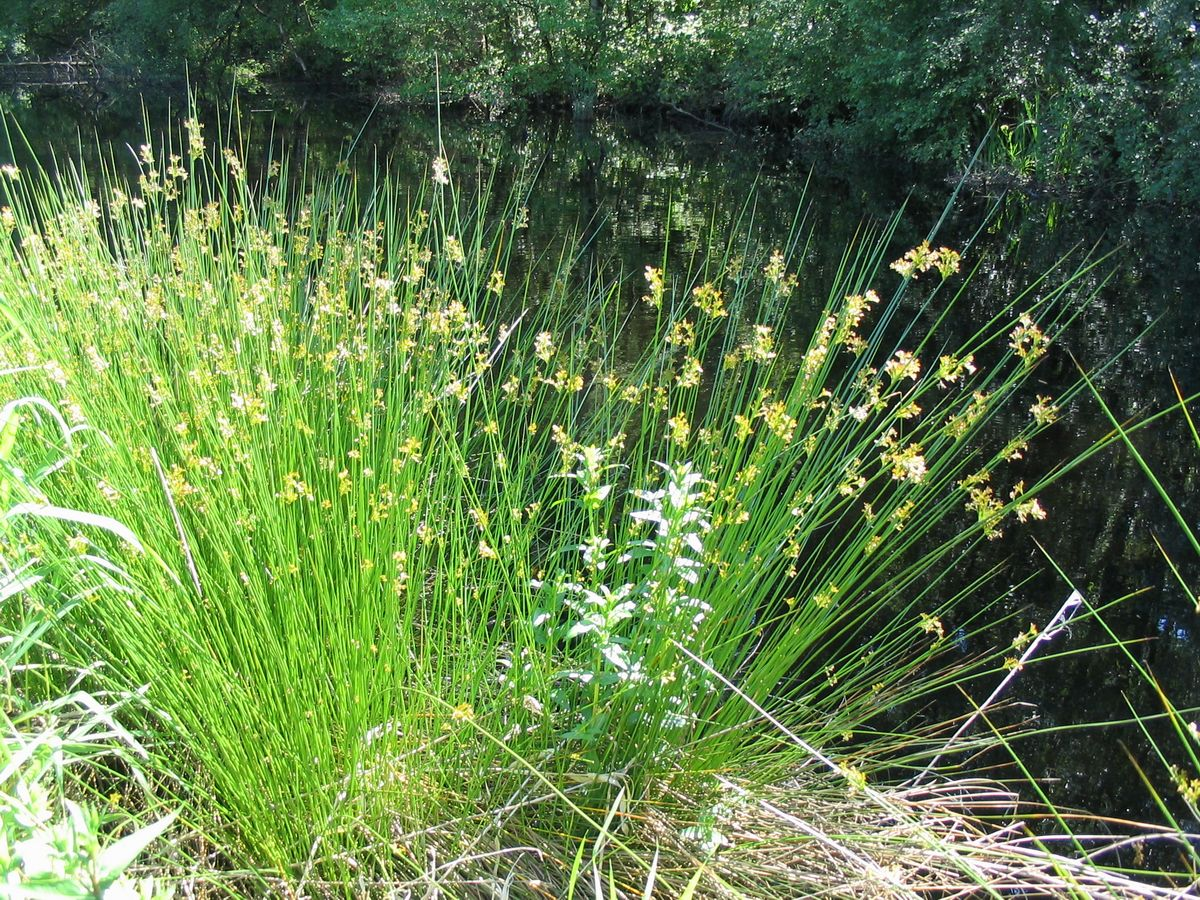
Common rush ( Juncus effusus )

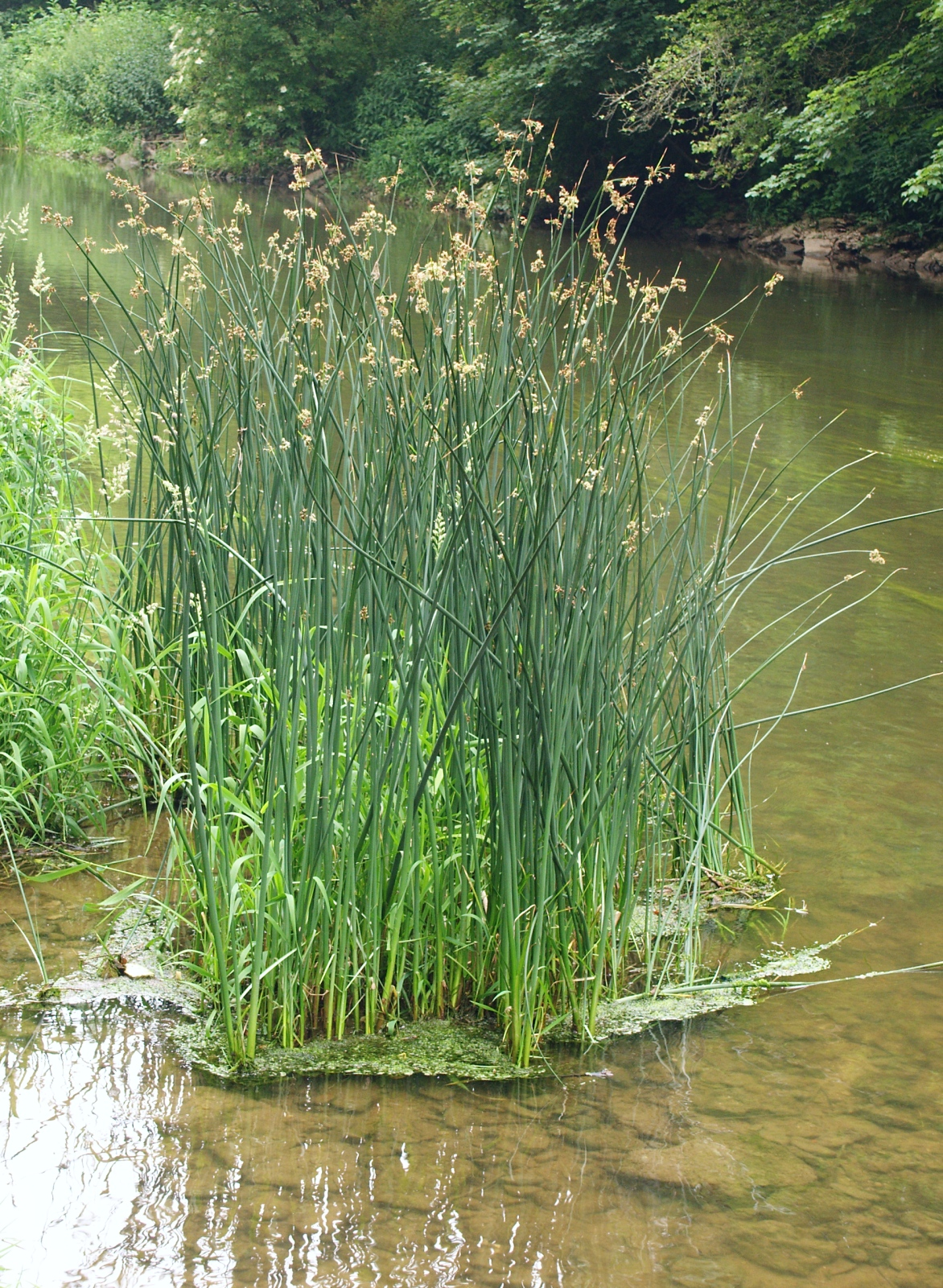
Common club-rush

Rush family – Juncaceae

Genus – Juncus

Species – Juncus effusus (Note: Prefers water logged ground) (Note: Used in medieval Europe for making rushlights)

- Common rush
- Soft rush

Sedge family – Cyperaceae

Genus – Schoenoplectus

Species – Schoenoplectus lacustris (Note: Prefers shallow water) (Note: Used for making pleated and woven products E.g baskets, mats.) (Note: Used in medieval Europe for Rushbearing)

- Common club-rush
- Bulrush
- Rush

Bulrush family – Typhaceae

Genus – Typha

Species – Typha latifolia (Note: Prefers shallow water) (Note: Used for flower arrangements)

- Bulrush
- Reedmace

== Common names - North America ==
Rush family – Juncaceae

Genus – Juncus

Species – Juncus effusus

- Common rush
- Soft rush

Species – Juncus interior

- Soft rush
- Interior rush

Sedge family – Cyperaceae

Genus – Schoenoplectus

Species – Schoenoplectus acutus (Note: The Northern Paiute people of the Carson Sink were known as the " Toi Ticutta " meaning " tule eaters ")

- Tule
- Common tule
- Hardstem tule
- Tule rush
- Hardstem bulrush
- Viscid bulrush

Bulrush family – Typhaceae

Genus – Typha

- Reed
- Cattail
- Punks

== Sources ==
=== Books ===
- Mabey, Richard (1996). Flora Britannica. Sinclair-Stevenson. ISBN 1-85619-377-2.
- Wheat, Margaret (1967). Survival Arts of the Paiute people.
