= Bilsdale =

Valley in North Yorkshire, England

Coordinates: 54.331°N 1.122°W

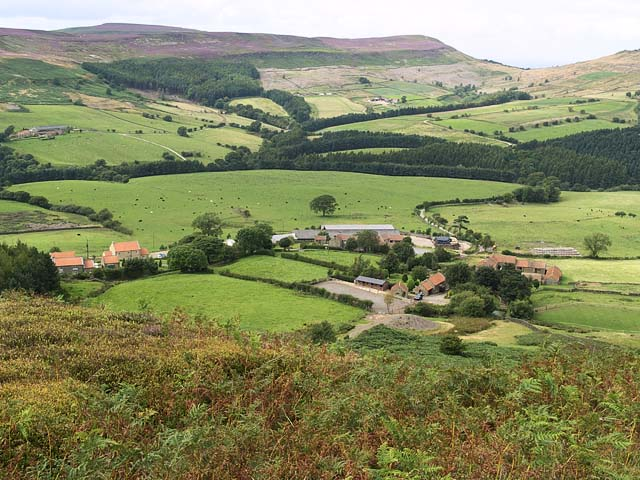
Urra Village in Bilsdale viewed from Urra Moor

Bilsdale is a dale in the western part of the North York Moors in North Yorkshire, England. The head of the dale is at Hasty Bank, and from there the dale extends 10 miles (16 km) south to meet Rye Dale near Hawnby. The dale is the valley of the River Seph, formed where Raisdale Beck joins Bilsdale Beck at the small village of Chop Gate in the north of the dale. The river flows south to meet the River Rye at Seph Mouth.

The dale is divided between two civil parishes. The upper part of the dale comprises the civil parish of Bilsdale Midcable and the lower part of the dale is in the civil parish of Hawnby.

== History ==
The place-name is derived from an Old Norse personal name Bildr, and so means "Bildr's valley".

In the 12th century the northern part of the dale was granted to Kirkham Priory, and the southern part to Rievaulx Abbey. Bilsdale Rievaulx was itself divided by the River Seph. The part to the west of the river became the township of Bilsdale Westside in the parish of Hawnby. The part to the east became part of the township of Bilsdale Midcable, which also included Bilsdale Kirkham, in the parish of Helmsley. An area above Laskill became a separate township of Helmsley parish, known as Laskill Pasture.

Spout House, a historic building in the valley, dates from 1550.

At the Dissolution of the Monasteries, both Bilsdale Kirkham and Bilsdale Rievaulx were granted to Thomas Manners, Earl of Rutland. His successors sold the estate in 1687 to the Duncombe family.

Low Mill was rebuilt about 1785 on the site of an earlier medieval mill. It is remarkably complete and its listing has recently been upgraded to Grade II*. The current owner is hoping to restore it to working order.

In the 19th century jet was extensively mined in the dale.

The townships of Bilsdale Westside, Bilsdale Midcable and Laskill Pasture became separate civil parishes in 1866. Bilsdale Westside and Laskill Pasture became part of the new Ryedale District in 1974, and were subsequently absorbed into the civil parish of Hawnby. Ryedale District was abolished in 2023 and the area is now administered by a unitary authority North Yorkshire Council. The main settlements in the dale are Chop Gate, Fangdale Beck and the ancient hamlet of Urra.

In 1969, Bilsdale transmitting station was erected above the dale on Bilsdale West Moor.
