= Chop Gate =

Village in North Yorkshire, England

Coordinates: 54.391171°N 1.1399699°W

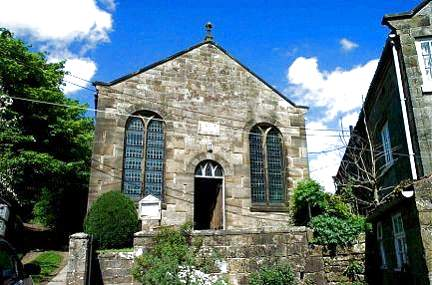
- Chop Gate Methodist Church

- Location within North Yorkshire
- OS grid reference: SE 5594 9986
- Unitary authority: North Yorkshire
- Ceremonial county: North Yorkshire
- Region: Yorkshire and the Humber
- Country: England
- Sovereign state: United Kingdom
- Post town: Middlesbrough
- Postcode district: TS9
- Police: North Yorkshire
- Fire: North Yorkshire
- Ambulance: Yorkshire
- UK Parliament: Richmond and Northallerton

Chop Gate (locally /ˌtʃɒp ˈjæt/ CHOP YAT) is a small village in the North York Moors national park, North Yorkshire, England. Historically part of the North Riding of Yorkshire, the village is situated 7.5 miles (12 km) south east of Stokesley and 12.5 miles (20 km) north of Helmsley. From 1974 to 2023 it was part of the Hambleton District. It is now administered by the unitary North Yorkshire Council.

== Location ==
The village is at the point where the roads to Bilsdale and Raindale meet. Chop Gate is on the B1257 road between Helmsley and Stokesley. The annual Bilsdale agricultural show takes place during August each year at Thornhill Farm, just outside Chop Gate.

== Religion ==
=== St Hilda's Anglican Church ===
St Hilda's Anglican church, which opened in 1853, is located between the hamlets of Urra and Seave Green, to the north of Chop Gate. There has been a church in Chop Gate since 1122.

=== Chop Gate former Methodist Church ===
There is a Methodist church building in Chop Gate. The church, which was part of the church's Stokesley circuit, dates from 1858, according to the sign over the door. It was converted into residential apartments in 2016.

== See also ==
- Listed buildings in Bilsdale Midcable
